= Gerard Bérchet =

French-American chemist (1902–1990)

Gérard J. Bérchet
- Born: December 3, 1902
- Died: November 26, 1990 (aged 87)
- Education: Collège de France
- Known for: Nylon, neoprene
- Spouse: Ruth Berchet
- Children: 2
- Scientific career
- Fields: Chemistry
- Workplaces: DuPont, University of Colorado
- Thesis: The Wurtz-Fittig reaction in liquid ammonia (1929)

Gérard Berchet (December 3, 1902 – November 26, 1990) was a French-American chemist who played a pivotal role in the invention of both nylon and neoprene. Berchet worked under the direction of Wallace Carothers at DuPont Experimental Station and first synthesized nylon 6 on February 28, 1935, from equal parts hexamethylenediamine and adipic acid. Berchet was the first to synthesize neoprene. However, Arthur Collins is credited with its discovery on April 17, 1930, after he accidentally reacted hydrochloric acid with vinylacetylene. Berchet's leaving of his sample unexamined on a laboratory bench until after Collin's discovery prevented him from being credited with its discovery.

Nylon is a synthetic polymer that can be melt-processed into fibers, films, and shapes and has significant applications in a wide variety of commercial products including apparel, electrical equipment, and food packaging. Neoprene or polychloroprene is a synthetic rubber produced by the polymerization of chloroprene. It is used in a wide variety of applications, such as electrical insulation, laptop sleeves, and automotive fan belts.

== Education and early life ==
Gérard Berchet was born in Lyon, France, on December 3, 1902.

Berchet studied chemistry at the Collège de France and received his doctorate in chemistry from the University of Colorado in June 1929.

During the summer of 1926, Berchet had met and befriended Wallace Carothers in Paris. Carothers and his colleague Jack Johnson helped Berchet get a visa to the United States and on September 8, 1926, Berchet, Carothers, and Johnson sailed third class on the SS Paris from Le Havre to New York City.

On September 14, 1926, Berchet arrived on Ellis Island to be cleared by immigration after a six-day voyage notable for the champagne bottle ceremoniously opened and drank each day by Berchet, Carothers, and Johnson, who were all facing Prohibition in America.

== Career and research ==
=== DuPont ===
In June 1929, Berchet began work at DuPont. Berchet was a member of a research group led by Wallace Carothers actively working on polymerization in "Purity Hall" at the DuPont Experimental Station. Some others working in the group were Paul J. Flory, Charles Stine, and Julian W. Hill.

The assignment of the group was to make polyesters via condensation polymerizations. Their initial attempts to create suitable commercial fibers failed as the fibers, while uniform and appearing to be strong, elastic and resilient, melted at low temperatures and were soluble in solvents. The group then turned their attention to using diacidic and dibasic molecules to create polyamide fibers based on condensation reactions.

During his time at DuPont Berchet played a pivotal role in the invention of neoprene and nylon. However, he is fully credited with neither discovery. In March 1930, Berchet was the first to synthesize neoprene by combining monovinyl acetylene with concentrated hydrochloric acid, but Arthur Collins was the first to discover neoprene several weeks later on April 17, 1930, since Berchet did not examine his sample until late April. Under the direction of Wallace Carothers Berchet synthesized nylon 6-6 from equal parts hexamethylenediamine and adipic acid on February 28, 1935.

Berchet served in the patent section at DuPont rather than the chemical department in the years following World War II.

==== Neoprene ====
Wallace Carothers assigned Berchet to isolate vinylacetylene in early 1930 as part of a larger project on divinyl acetylene. Fr Julius Arthur Nieuwland, a professor of chemistry at the University of Notre Dame, had produced divinyl acetylene during his research on acetylene chemistry. DuPont purchased the patent rights for divinyl acetylene after Elmer K. Bolton attended a lecture by Nieuwland. By February 20, 1930, Berchet had isolated enough vinylacetylene from divinyl acetylene to study. After a series of inconclusive experiments, Berchet, under the direction of Carothers, treated monovinyl acetylene with a variety of reagents and put 25 samples in sealed containers. One of these samples was monovinyl acetylene combined with concentrated hydrochloric acid. However, Berchet let his samples stand for five weeks on his laboratory bench before determining what transformations might have occurred. Before Berchet examined his samples, Arthur Collins accidentally discovered chloroprene on April 17, 1930, by combining monovinyl acetylene with concentrated hydrochloric acid. Arthur Collins was assigned to Carother's group in early February and had previously worked with divinyl acetylene while at the Jackson Laboratory. Chloroprene, now known as neoprene, was the first synthetic rubber. DuPont marketed the product under the name DuPrene in 1931.

==== Nylon ====
Carothers' group at the DuPont Experimental Station had been using condensation polymerizations to make polyester, but the fibers melted at low temperatures and were soluble in common solvents and were therefore not suitable as commercial products. Carothers' group turned their attention to using diacidic and dibasic molecules to create polyamide fibers.

After several failures, the group completed a systematic study of potential polyamides by combining diamines with a similar series of diacids. 81 potential candidates for polyamides were identified, and in 1935 Berchet was assigned to the polyamide project to work on them. He constructed and purified many of the diamines so they could be polymerized. In his research Berchet made examples of several other types of polyamide polymers.

On February 28, 1935, Berchet prepared nylon 6-6, a condensation copolymer constructed from equal parts adipic acid and hexamethylenediamine.

Berchet's laboratory notes from his creation of nylon 6-6 are as follows:

Adipate of hexamethylene diamine

7 g. diamine, 8.8 g. acid and 20 cc. m-cresol heated 215° for 3 hours. Water came off during the first half hour. The temp. was then raised to 255-60° and the cresol distilled off in the vacuum. The residue solidified at one time but then melted again at 265°. It was heated under 1 mm at 265° for 3 hours. On cooling (overnight) the polymer broke the flask by contracting and showed a tenacious adherence to glass.

It was a very hard, horny solid melting at 252-254°. It was very readily spinnable. Sample turned over to D. D. Coffman.

There was obtained 12.5 g. of polymer, yield 90%.

3/1/35 GJB 3/21/35 H. B. Dykstra

The half-ounce of pearly, lustrous mass obtained became DuPont's nylon. The fibers formed were elastic and strong after cold drawing and were both unaffected by water or most solvents and had a higher melting point than previous fibers.

The fibers were initially called Fiber 6-6, but were eventually named Nylon 6-6.

== Personal life ==
Berchet met his wife, Ruth, during his time at the University of Colorado. After he completed his Ph.D. in 1929, they moved to Wilmington, Delaware, to work for Carothers at the DuPont Experimental Station. Berchet had two children. In Wilmington Berchet joined a small acting troupe called the Brandywinders in 1932 and played in 47 of their productions over 50 years. In an interview he stated America was "a country where the majority of men and women were obliging, kind-hearted, open-handed, generous to a fault, and didn't even seem to know it". Later in his career he became an outspoken francophile, declaring virtually everything in his native France better.
