= Elmer Keiser Bolton =

American chemist (1886-1968)

Elmer Keiser Bolton (June 23, 1886 – July 30, 1968) was an American chemist and research director for DuPont, notable for his role in developing neoprene and directing the research that led to the discovery of nylon.

== Personal life ==
Bolton was born in Frankford, Philadelphia, Pennsylvania, the oldest of two brothers. His father ran the furniture store on Main Street, and both he and his brother attended public school in Frankford and went on to college. Bolton went to Bucknell University in Lewisburg, Pennsylvania, and took the Classical Course, receiving a B.A. degree in 1908. From there he went to Harvard University, receiving his A.M. degree in 1910 and his Ph.D. in organic chemistry in 1913. His thesis advisor was Charles Loring Jackson, and his dissertation concerned the chemistry of periodoquinones.

Several other prominent contemporaries of Bolton's at Harvard Graduate School were Roger Adams, Farrington Daniels, Frank C. Whitmore, James B. Sumner and James Bryant Conant. Adams was particularly influential through Bolton's career. They shared diverse interests, yet a drive for accomplishment in organic chemistry. In later years Adams had significant influence on Bolton's ideas about industrial support of chemical research and university students.

In 1913 Bolton won the Sheldon Fellowship, which he used to work at the Kaiser Wilhelm Institute outside of Berlin, Germany, for two years with Professor Richard Willstätter. Here he worked on anthocyanins, a major program for Willstätter, and published three papers on isolation and structures of anthocyanin pigments. Willstätter, apparently impressed by Bolton's ability but frustrated by his tendency to make arithmetic mistakes, commented "You must have been a bank teller." To his surprise Bolton replied that he had been a bank teller, this was how he paid his way through college.

Bolton was very impressed by Willstätter's careful, logical approach to tackling a research problem. He felt that this was the result of good training in the German university system. He also observed the relationship between German universities and industry, for which there was no counterpart in the United States. Another aspect of German research that impressed Bolton was the effort to create artificial rubber. This work was significant to German industry, and later to the German war effort in World War II because Germany did not have ready access to sources of natural rubber. Also, the approach being used by the Germans undoubtedly lead to the development of neoprene rubber years later at DuPont Labs.

Bolton married Margarite L. Duncan in 1916 and they had three children, a daughter and two sons. He retired from DuPont after a distinguished career in 1951, but continued to follow the scientific literature. He died July 30, 1968, at the age of eighty-two.

== World War I and DuPont ==
From the 1870s up to the onset of World War I (1914), the organic chemical industry of Germany was a world-leading force in research, development, production, and export; most organic compounds used in America, such as textile dyes and some medicines, were imported from Germany. The disruption of this trade by the war presented an industrial problem at first but simultaneously offered an opportunity for American chemical companies to meet a wartime need and to become better established in this field. When Bolton returned from Germany in 1915 he discovered American organic chemists struggling to develop methods for manufacturing these compounds. The Dupont Company needed chemists, and hired Bolton in 1915.

Bolton joined the Chemical Department at the Experimental Station outside Wilmington, Delaware, where most of DuPont's research was conducted. Being groomed for advancement, he started working on the synthesis of glycerol. By 1916 Bolton was selected to lead the Dye Group that was newly formed to research the synthesis of dyes. The United States had little knowledge of dye manufacture at this time, so later in 1916 Bolton traveled to England to learn about British technology in this area, and upon return he was assigned to the Wilmington Office to be advisor on dyes and intermediates. In 1918 he transferred to the Dyestuffs Department and was assistant general manager of the Lodi Works where silk colorants were made. In 1919 he returned to the Chemical Department as manager of the Organic Division. During this time he learned much about developing manufacturing processes and developed two principles; that high priority must be given to cost and time effectiveness of research, and that a manufacturing process should be perfected using pure materials, then later adapted to use materials available to the plant. Bolton's friend from Harvard, Roger Adams shared much of Bolton's philosophy in his work at the University of Illinois at Urbana-Champaign.

In 1922 DuPont reorganized its research by dividing the entire research enterprise into four parts, each assigned to one of its four production areas. Bolton was made director of research for the Dyestuffs Department where his ability in this capacity was quickly realized. Dye manufacture requires the synthesis of a large number of intermediate compounds, and Bolton realized these could be used in many activities outside the Dyestuffs Department. By 1923 his lab was working on accelerators for manufacture of synthetic rubber and soon after extended the research to include antioxidants for gasoline and rubber, floatation agents, insecticides, seed disinfectants, and large scale manufacture of tetraethyllead.

== The Stevenson Act and synthetic rubber ==
In the early 1920s the supply and demand of natural rubber became a concern in international trade. After a scramble for rubber during World War I, there was a glut when the war ended, depressing prices. In November 1922 England enacted the Stevenson Act that was intended to protect rubber producers by restricting production and keeping prices from being ruinously low. But this caused a great deal of concern in the United States because an expanding supply of rubber was needed to support the growing number of automobiles in use. Synthetic rubber as a practical, durable, affordable commodity was a problem that had resisted chemists' efforts for many decades. Bolton saw this as an opportune time to start DuPont research on synthetic rubber. However, this research did not begin in earnest until 1925, when the high price of rubber was attracting considerable attention and other scientists such as Thomas Edison were also taking an interest in the problem.

Bolton's group's work on synthetic rubber began with the polymerization of butadiene obtained from the hydrogenation of diacetylene, and at first not much progress was made. At the end of 1925 Bolton met chemist Julius Arthur Nieuwland from the University of Notre Dame who had discovered a way to polymerize acetylene using a cuprous oxide catalyst. Unfortunately the resulting polymer would explode when struck, but Bolton believed the process could be modified to produce a stable compound that would replace butadiene in the reaction. Bolton brought Nieuwland into the project as a consultant to DuPont, and Nieuwland taught the DuPont chemists how to use his catalyst. A continuous-flow reactor was developed that would produce a good yield of the stable polymer Bolton was seeking. While the polymer was highly chemical resistant, it degraded with exposure to light.

In 1927 DuPont's Chemical Director C.M.A. Stine persuaded the company to take on a fundamental research project for synthetic rubber and received $250,000 in funding for this purpose. In 1928 Wallace Carothers, an instructor at Harvard University, was hired to lead the newly formed group. Bolton operated within this group and by 1929 had discovered that his polymer could be readily converted into 2-chlorobutadiene (chloroprene) with a copper catalyzed addition of hydrogen chloride. This material was both chemical and light resistant, with the properties of a synthetic rubber.

The new material was announced at the Rubber Division of the American Chemical Society on November 2, 1931, and was named with the trademark Duprene (today the generic name is neoprene). By this time the Stevenson Act had been repealed and the Great Depression had begun. Rubber prices were low and the new material cost twenty times what natural rubber cost. Therefore, DuPont's first neoprene never became a substitute for natural rubber, but it did find commercial use in applications where a rubber compound was needed that was more resistant to oils and outdoor degradation. It thus made an important economic contribution albeit in a different way from its original conception: instead of replacing natural rubber supplies as envisioned, it augmented them and extended the applications of rubber (in both natural and artificial forms). Today, applications of neoprene include: the Rigid-hulled inflatable boat; diving suits, and diveskins; gloves, balaclavas, sleepsacks, Knee high boots, wetsocks and other protective clothing; radar absorbent material; plumbing fixtures; gaskets, hoses, seals and belts; foam (mousepad, wetsuit); orthopedic braces; and solid fuel rocket propellant (see AGM-114 Hellfire).

== Synthetic fibers ==
When Wallace Carothers arrived at DuPont in 1928 one of the tasks his group took on was the development of new synthetic fibers for textiles. At that time a number of natural polymers such as latex and cellulose were in common use, rayon as a semisynthetic from nitrated cellulose had recently been improved and begun upending the textile industries, and some fully synthetic polymers such as bakelite were also known and being used for certain applications, but the existing fully synthetic polymers could not be drawn into fibers and spun into thread, so great opportunity existed to manufacture thread and yarn from synthetic polymers to join or replace the existing fibers in the market (natural fibers such as cotton, wool, linen, and silk and artificial fiber in the various recently emerged types of rayon).

The approach taken by Carothers' group was to adapt known syntheses that produced short-chain polymers to produce long-chain molecules. The first break was finding that bifunctional esterification could produce long molecule chains which today are known as aliphatic polyesters, but at that time were called superpolymers. Then there was the key observation by Julian W. Hill in April, 1930 in which it was seen that the superpolymers could be drawn in the molten state to form thin, transparent fibers that were much stronger than the polymers were in the undrawn state. However, the superpolymers the group was able to synthesize either had too low a boiling point and insufficient chemical resistivity or had too high a melting point to be spun. By late 1932 the entire project was discontinued.

Bolton, now the Chemistry department director, refused to give up. Most likely he was aware of the re-discovery of polyethylene by Eric Fawcett and Reginald Gibson at Imperial Chemical Industries in 1933. In early 1934 Bolton urged Carothers to continue the research, and Carothers decided to take another look at polyamides.

Carothers surmised that the problem with the polyamides that had been made from ε-aminocaproic acid was due to cyclization reactions, so he replaced ε-aminocaproic acid with 9-aminononoic acid which would not cyclize. This produced results that were encouraging, so Carother's group prepared polyamides from a variety of compounds including amino acids, dibase acids and diamines. The leading candidate for development became 5/10 polyamide made from pentamethylenediamine and sebic acid. It had the right melting point, the desired properties in fiber form and could be spun without gel formation.

Bolton at this point made a bold and characteristically visionary decision. He decided that practical synthetic fibers could not be made from castor oil, the only practical source of sebacic acid. To use an agricultural product as a primary feedstock would mean the new synthetic material would have very similar mass production problems as existing natural fibers had. Instead he wanted to use benzene as the feedstock for making both adipic acid and hexamethylenediamine to make a 6/6 polyamide.

This polymer was first made early in 1935, and thanks to concurrent development of polyamine spinning technologies, could be spun into fibers. The fibers had high strength and elasticity, were insensitive to common solvents and melted at 263 °C, well above ironing temperatures.

Bolton insisted that every aspect of the synthesis of this polymer be thoroughly worked out in a pilot plant at the Experimental Station. He insisted that the development begin with pure materials then be adapted to use materials available to a plant in bulk.

On October 27, 1938 DuPont announced it would build a plant at Seaford, Delaware to make nylon, the world's first fully synthetic fiber. The Seaford plant was essentially a scaled-up version of the pilot plant, and had remarkably trouble-free startup.

== Publications ==
- E.K. Bolton, Development of Nylon, Industrial and Engineering Chemistry, (Jan 1942)
- Twenty-one U.S. Patents

== Awards and honors ==
Bucknell University:

  - Honorary D.Sc. degree (1932)
  - Board of Trustees (1937-1967)
  - Trustee Emeritus (1967-1968)
- University of Delaware, Honorary D.Sc. degree (1942)
- Massachusetts Institute of Technology visiting committees (1938-1939)
- Harvard University visiting committees (1940-1941)
- American Chemical Society:
  - regional director (1936-1938)
  - director-at-large (1940-1943)
- Industrial and Engineering Chemistry and Chemical Engineering News Advisory Board (1948-1949)
- The Chemical Industry Medal (1941)
- The Perkin Medal (1945)
- Elected to the National Academy of Sciences (1946)
- The Willard Gibbs Medal (1954)
