= George Jarvis Brush =

American mineralogist and academic administrator

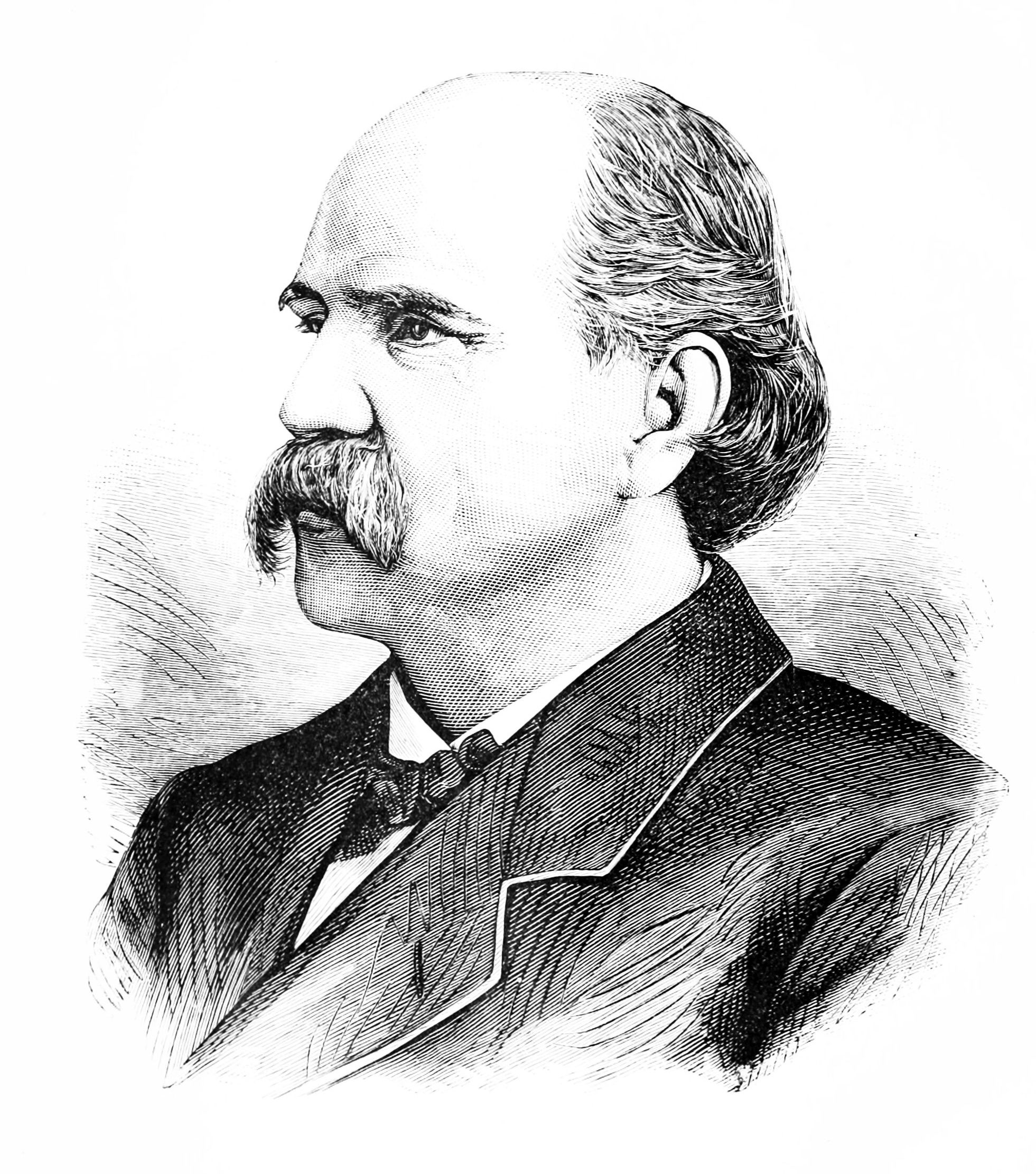
- Born: December 15, 1831; Brooklyn, New York
- Died: February 5, 1912 (aged 80); New Haven, Connecticut
- Scientific career
- Fields: Mineralogy
- Workplaces: Sheffield Scientific School; American Association for the Advancement of Science

George Jarvis Brush (December 15, 1831 – February 5, 1912) was an American mineralogist and academic administrator who spent most of his career at Yale University in the Sheffield Scientific School.

== Career ==
Brush was born in Brooklyn, New York on December 15, 1831. He studied at Cream Hill Agricultural School and commenced his studies at Yale in 1848 with courses from Benjamin Silliman, Jr. and John Pitkin Norton on practical chemistry and agriculture. He also studied chemistry, metallurgy and mineralogy. He left in 1850 to work with Benjamin Silliman, Jr. but received his Ph.D. from Yale in 1852 by special examination. From 1852 to 1855, Brush worked and studied at the University of Virginia and in Munich and Freiberg. He returned to Sheffield in 1855 to join the faculty as professor of Metallurgy and later of Mineralogy. Brush had begun acquiring an extensive research collection of minerals. He was appointed the first curator of the Peabody Museum of Natural History's mineral collection. He was a member of the Connecticut Academy of Arts and Sciences.

In 1872, he became the first director of Sheffield, where he also supervised mineralogy. He served as the president of the American Association for the Advancement of Science in 1881. He published extensively in the American Journal of Science and other journals. He also published a Manual of Determinative Mineralogy (1875; fifteenth edition, 1899).

In 1898, Brush retired from teaching and administration at Sheffield. He continued serving at the school, however, as secretary, treasurer and president of the board, until 1911.

In 1904, Brush donated his collection of minerals, along with funds for their maintenance, to Sheffield. Originally housed in Hammond Hall at Yale, the Brush Collection is now administered by the Division of Mineralogy at the Yale Peabody Museum.

Brush died in New Haven on February 5, 1912. The mineral brushite was named in his honor by G. E. Moore.

== Literature ==
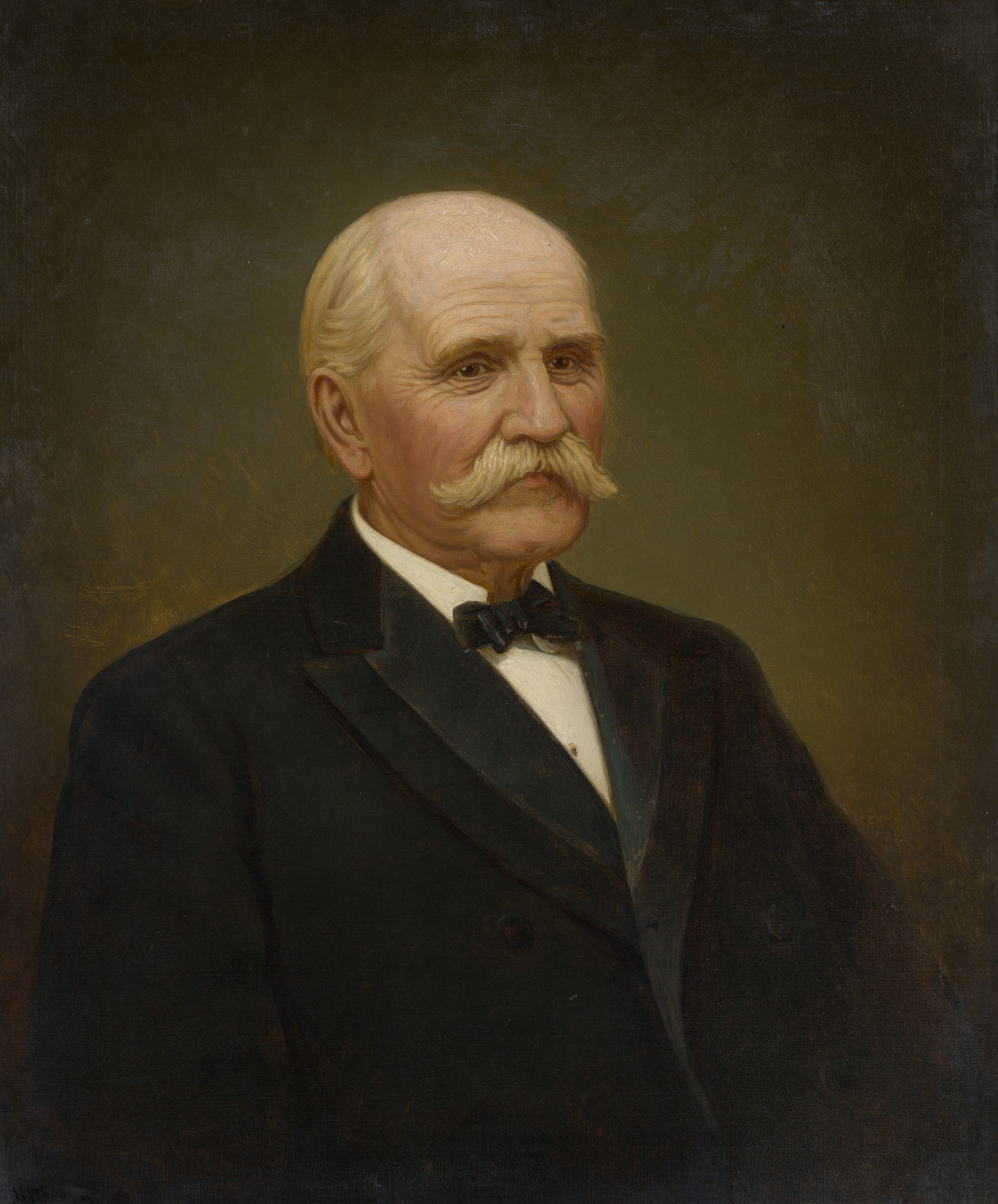
Portrait of Brush by Harry Ives Thompson

- On the Chemical Composition of Clintonite, Second Series, Vol. XVIII, №54- Nov. 1854
- On Chalcodite. Am. Journal of Science and Arts, Vol.25, p. 1-4, March 1858
- Mineralogical notices. Am. Journal of Science and Arts, Vol.26, p. 64-70,1858
  - Gieseckite?
  - Compact Pyrophyllite
  - Unionite
  - Feldspare from the Danbureite locality
- On Boltonite. Am. Journal of Science and Arts, Vol.27, p. 395-398, May 1859
- The System of Mineralogy: Descriptive Mineralogy, Comprising the Most Recent Discoveries with James Dwight Dana (1868)
- Manual of Determinative Mineralogy: With an Introduction on Blowpipe Analysis (1898)

== Sources ==
- George Brush, Peabody Museum, Yale University

== See also ==
- Cookeite
