= Henry Barker Hill =

American chemist

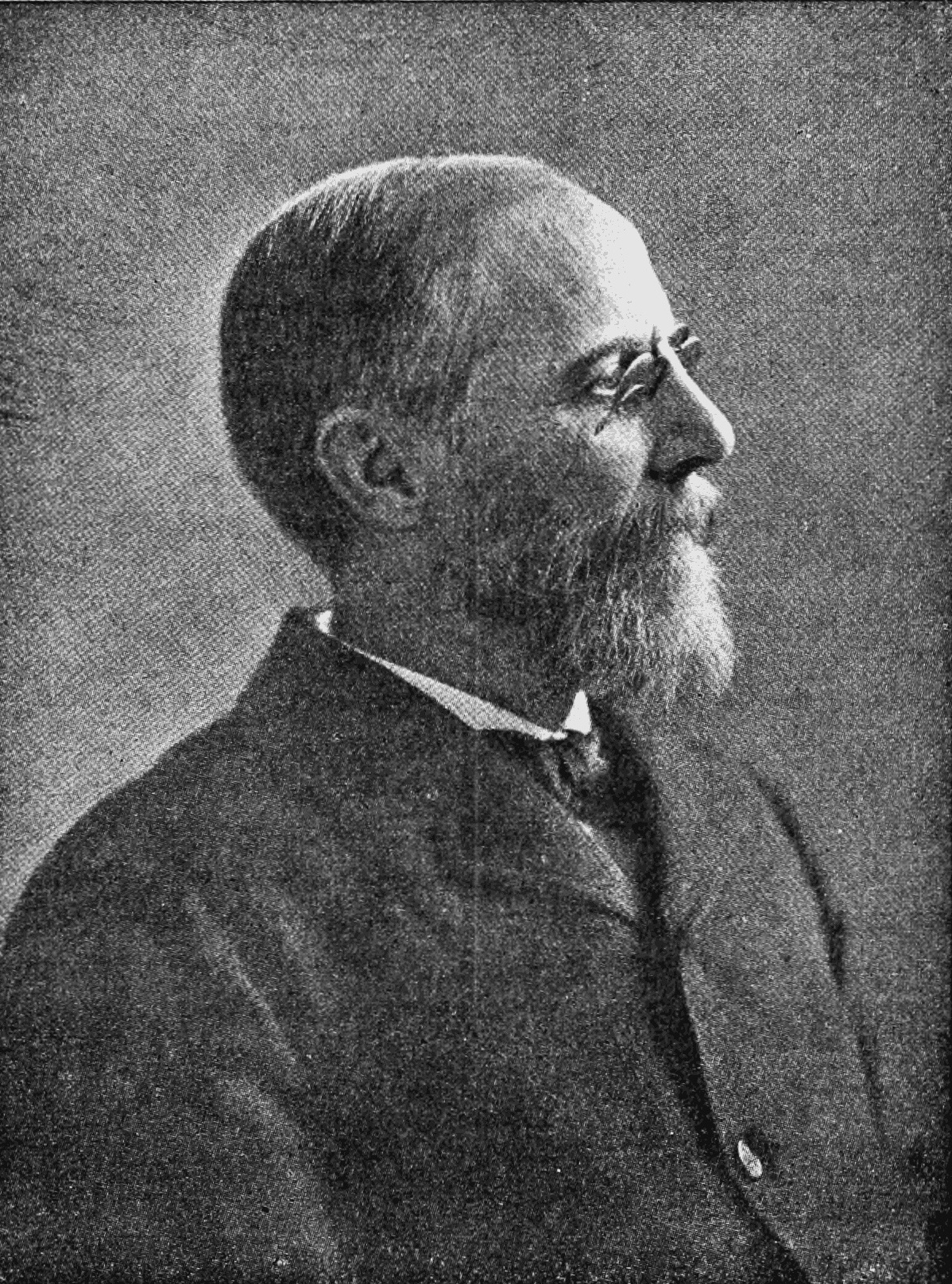
- Born: April 27, 1849; Waltham, Massachusetts
- Died: April 6, 1903 (aged 53); Chestnut Hill, Massachusetts
- Scientific career
- Academic advisors: Josiah Parsons Cooke

Henry Barker Hill (April 27, 1849 – April 6, 1903) was an American chemist and director of the Chemistry Laboratory at Harvard University.

== Biography ==
Henry Barker Hill was born in Waltham, Massachusetts on April 27, 1849, the son of the Reverend Thomas Hill, president of Antioch College and Harvard.

He graduated from Harvard in 1869, then studied in Berlin under A. W. Hofmann. Upon his return, he became assistant in chemistry at Harvard, working alongside Charles Loring Jackson under professor Josiah Parsons Cooke. Hill became assistant professor in 1874 and full professor in 1884. He was a member of the National Academy of Sciences, and a fellow of the American Academy of Arts and Sciences.

He died at his home in Chestnut Hill, Massachusetts on April 6, 1903.
