= Josiah Parsons Cooke =

American mineralogist and chemist (1827–1894)

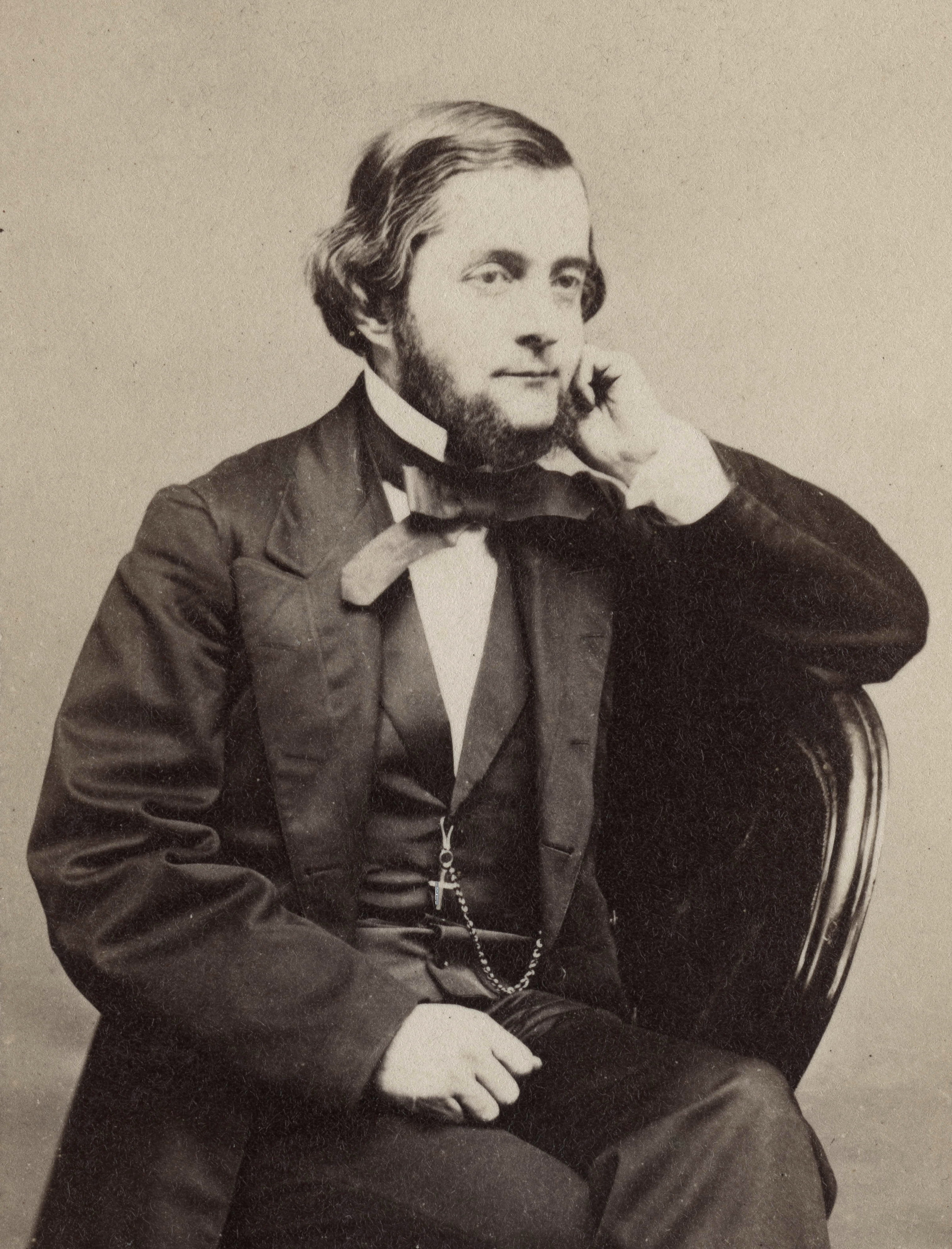
- Born: October 12, 1827; Boston, Massachusetts
- Died: September 3, 1894 (aged 66); Newport, Rhode Island
- Resting place: Mount Auburn Cemetery
- Education: Boston Latin School; Harvard College, A.B. (1848)
- Occupations: Chemist; author
- Spouse: Mary H. Huntington (m. 1860)
- Scientific career
- Known for: Measurement of atomic weights
- Fields: Chemistry
- Workplaces: Harvard University
- Doctoral students: Theodore William Richards; Charles Loring Jackson; Henry Barker Hill

12th president of the American Academy of Arts and Sciences
- In office 1892–1894
- Preceded by: Joseph Lovering
- Succeeded by: Alexander Agassiz

Josiah Parsons Cooke (October 12, 1827 – September 3, 1894) was an American chemist who worked at Harvard University and was instrumental in the measurement of atomic weights, inspiring America's first Nobel laureate in chemistry, Theodore William Richards, to pursue similar research. Cooke's 1854 paper on atomic weights has been said to foreshadow the periodic law developed later by Mendeleev and others. Historian I. Bernard Cohen described Cooke "as the first university chemist to do truly distinguished work in the field of chemistry" in the United States.

== Life and work ==
Josiah Parsons Cooke was born in Boston, Massachusetts on October 12, 1827. He attended Boston Latin School and as a teenager set up his own chemical laboratory, partly due to an interest sparked by lectures of Yale's Benjamin Silliman. The teaching of chemistry at Harvard was in poor shape at this time, so after Cooke entered the university in 1843 he continued to be largely self-taught in the subject. Cooke graduated from Harvard in 1848 with an A.B., and became a mathematics tutor there the following year. In 1850 he was elected the Erving Professor of Chemistry and Mineralogy at Harvard, although he had had little formal education in chemistry.

Reversing the modern order, after Cooke obtained his professorship he embarked on a plan of advanced study, spending eight months in Europe attending the lectures of Dumas and Regnault. On returning to the United States, Cooke began in earnest to raise the standard of chemical education at Harvard, introducing required courses in chemistry, accompanied by laboratory instruction. He was one of the first, if not the very first, in the United States to use laboratory work to teach chemistry.

Cooke's first publication was in 1852, a study of an arsenic crystal. This was followed by investigations of the atomic weights of arsenic and other elements. In 1857 he published a collection of chemical problems for use of the undergraduates of Harvard College with reference to the Elements of Chemistry by Julius Adolph Stöckhardt. By 1862 Cooke also was publishing in the new field of spectroscopy. He studied crystals throughout his career, and the mineral "Cookeite", an aluminosilicate quartz, is named after him. In addition to his research efforts, Cooke taught a course in introductory chemistry for over forty years and was, by all accounts, quite successful at it. According to Jackson, Cooke published forty-one scientific papers based on his research and thirty-two on other subjects, along with at least eight books.

Among the areas in which Cooke took an interest and published in was the relationship between religion and science.

In 1860, Cooke married Mary H. Huntington, the daughter of Elisha Huntington and sister of William Reed Huntington; the couple had no children. In 1859–1860, Huntington's brother William was Assistant in Chemistry for Cooke at Harvard. Cooke died September 3, 1894, in Newport, Rhode Island, and was buried at Mount Auburn Cemetery.

== Selected writings ==
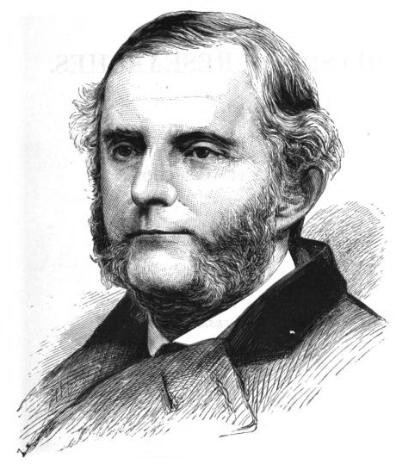
Josiah Parsons Cooke

- Cooke, Josiah Parsons; Stöckhardt, Julius Adolph (1857). Problems and Reactions, to Accompany Stöckhardt's Elements of Chemistry. E. H. Butler. p. 148. "Chemical Problems and Reactions."
- Cooke, Josiah Parsons (1860). Elements of Chemical Physics. Little, Brown and Company.
- Cooke, Josiah Parsons (1864). Religion and Chemistry; or, Proofs of God's Plan in the Atmosphere and its Elements. C. Scribner's Sons. p. 372. "Josiah Parsons Cooke."
- Cooke, Josiah Parsons (1876). Scientific Culture. Henry S. King and Company.
- Cooke, Josiah Parsons (1881). Chemical and Physical Researches. Cambridge. p. 564. "Josiah Parsons Cooke."
- Cooke, Josiah Parsons (1885). Principles of Chemical Philosophy. J. Allyn.
- Cooke, Josiah Parsons (1888). The New Chemistry. Appleton. ISBN 0-315-28901-5.
- Cooke, Josiah Parsons (1888). The Credentials of Science the Warrant of Faith. Robert Carter and Brothers. ISBN 0-8370-2735-7.
- Cooke, Josiah Parsons; Board Of Overseers, Harvard University (1890). A Plea for Liberal Culture. J. Wilson and Son, University Press. p. 46. "A Plea for Liberal Culture."
- Cooke, Josiah Parsons (1896). Laboratory Practice: A Series of Experiments on the Fundamental Principles. D. Appleton and Company. p. 220. "Josiah Parsons Cooke."

== Activities and honors ==
- National Academy of Sciences, elected a member in 1872
- Associate editor, American Journal of Science, 1877
- Doctor of Laws (LL.D.), honorary degree from the University of Cambridge, 1882
- Fellow of the American Academy of Arts and Sciences, 1853; President, 1892–1894
