= Frank C. Whitmore =

Chemist

Frank Clifford Whitmore (October 1, 1887 – June 24, 1947), nicknamed "Rocky", was a prominent chemist who submitted significant evidence for the existence of carbocation mechanisms in organic chemistry.

He was born in 1887 in the town of North Attleborough, Massachusetts.

== Academic career ==
Whitmore earned both his bachelor's degree (1911) and Ph.D. (1914) from Harvard University, where his Ph.D. advisor was Charles Loring Jackson. Several prominent contemporaries of Whitmore at Harvard were E.K. Bolton, Farrington Daniels, Roger Adams, James B. Sumner and James Bryant Conant. After graduating from Harvard he became a professor and taught at the University of Minnesota, Northwestern University, and The Pennsylvania State University.

At Penn State, Whitmore served as the Dean of the School of Chemistry and Physics from 1929–1947, succeeding his former Harvard colleague Gerald Wendt in the position. He hired several prominent scientists as faculty members, including Russell Marker and Merrell Fenske.

Whitmore was a member of several academic societies, namely the American Academy of Arts and Sciences (1939), the American Philosophical Society (1943), and the United States National Academy of Sciences (1946).

== Research and publications ==
While at the Pennsylvania State University Whitmore did his research on carbocations. The field of organic chemistry was struggling to explain how a compound with a double bonded carbon, an alkene, reacts with a halide compound. Whitmore worked on the findings of others and generalized the concept of molecules with a positively charged carbon atom, a carbocation, as an intermediate step in the addition of a halogen element.

Whitmore would go on to publish his findings in a paper titled "The Common Basis of Intramolecular Rearrangements." They were controversial at the time because many chemists, notably well known chemist Roger Adams, a critic of Whitmore's, believed that a molecule like a carbocation would never be stable enough to exist. Nevertheless, Whitmore published these findings which today are accepted as the most logical explanation for the reactions in question.

In 1937, Whitmore published Organic Chemistry, the first advanced organic chemistry textbook to be written in English. Whitmore worked on a revision of the book for several years, though the work was interrupted by World War II. The second edition of Organic Chemistry was published posthumously in 1951.

== American Chemical Society ==
Whitmore was very active in the American Chemical Society (ACS), holding several different offices in the organization throughout his life. In 1938, he served as president of ACS. During his presidency, he visited 72 of 104 local ACS sections. In 1937, Whitmore won the prized William H. Nichols Medal Award, given by the New York section of ACS. In 1945, Whitmore was awarded the Willard Gibbs Medal (considered to be the highest chemical honor in America) by the Chicago section of ACS.

Whitmore rarely slept. It was not rare for him work twenty hours a day, and take one-hour naps when he was tired.

== Personal life ==
Whitmore married Marion Gertrude Mason (who graduated from Radcliffe College with a degree in chemistry in 1912) in 1914. The Whitmores had four children: Frank Jr., Mason, Harry, and Marion, Jr ("Marionette").

Whitmore died in 1947 at the age of 59 as the result of a heart ailment.

Penn State's Whitmore Laboratory is named after Whitmore.
