= 1,4-Dichlorobut-2-ene =

Chemical compound

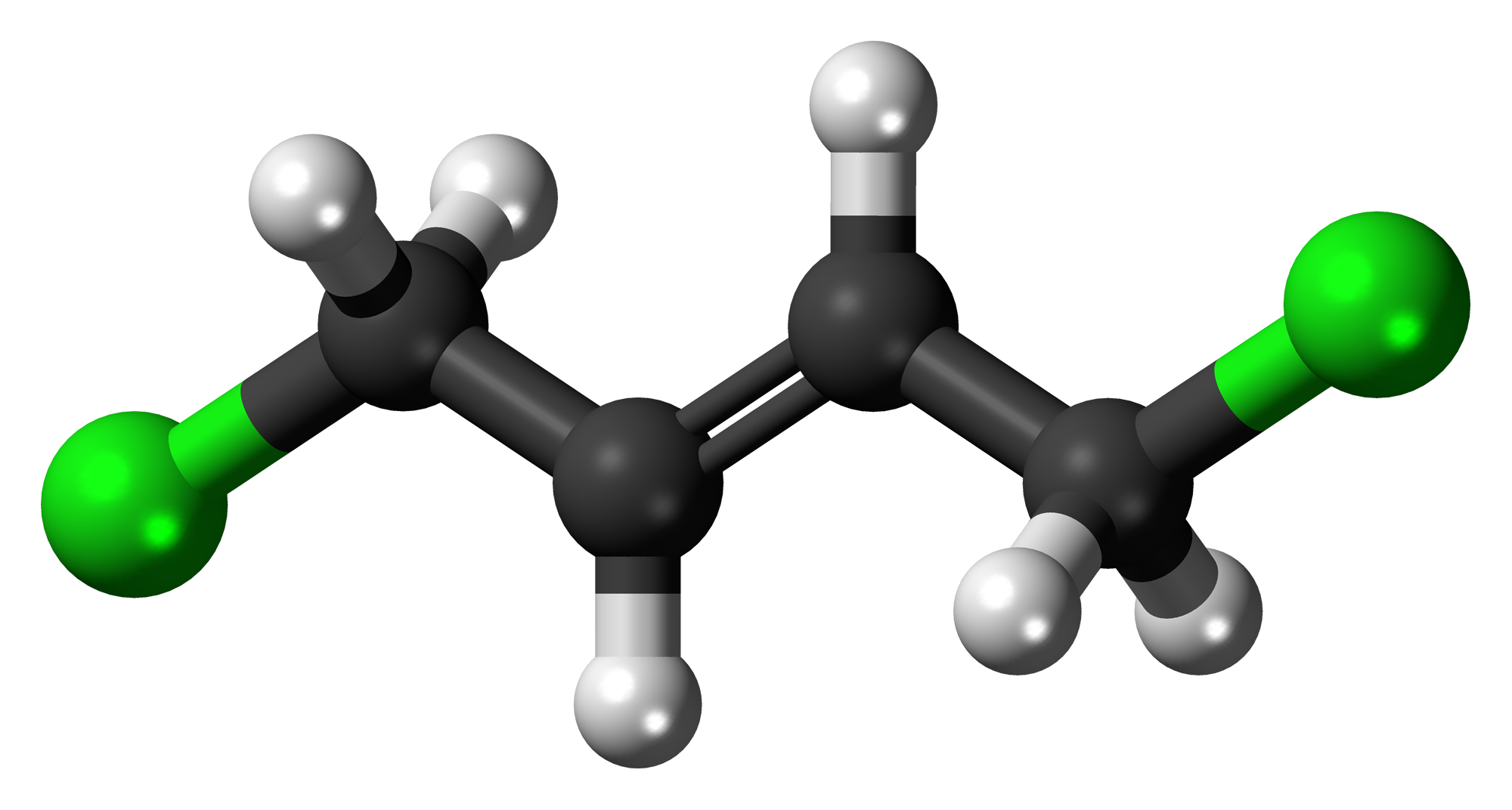

Names
- IUPAC name 1,4-Dichlorobut-2-ene
- Other names trans-1,4-Dichlorobutene

Identifiers
CAS Number	110-57-6
3D model (JSmol)	Interactive image; Interactive image
ChEBI	CHEBI:82446
ChEMBL	ChEMBL468582
ChemSpider	557415
ECHA InfoCard	100.003.437
EC Number	203-779-7
KEGG	C19398
PubChem CID	642197
UNII	92HZ946H7Y
UN number	2920 2927 2922
CompTox Dashboard (EPA)	DTXSID6020434
- InChI: InChI=1S/C4H6Cl2/c5-3-1-2-4-6/h1-2H,3-4H2 Key: FQDIANVAWVHZIR-UHFFFAOYSA-N; InChI=1/C4H6Cl2/c5-3-1-2-4-6/h1-2H,3-4H2/b2-1+ Key: FQDIANVAWVHZIR-OWOJBTEDBY; InChI=1S/C4H6Cl2/c5-3-1-2-4-6/h1-2H,3-4H2 Key: FQDIANVAWVHZIR-UHFFFAOYSA-N
- SMILES: ClC/C=C/CCl; ClCC=CCCl

Properties
Chemical formula	C_{4}H_{6}Cl_{2}
Molar mass	124.99 g·mol^{−1}
Appearance	Colorless liquid
Density	1.13 g/mL
Melting point	1 °C (34 °F; 274 K)
Boiling point	125.5 °C (257.9 °F; 398.6 K)

Hazards
- GHS labelling
Pictograms	(GHS06: Toxic) (GHS08: Health hazard) (GHS05: Corrosive) (GHS09: Environmental hazard)
Signal word	Danger
Hazard statements	H301, H311, H314, H330, H350, H410
Precautionary statements	P201, P202, P210, P233, P240, P241, P242, P243, P260, P264, P270, P271, P273, P280, P281, P284, P301+P310, P301+P330+P331, P302+P352, P303+P361+P353, P304+P340, P305+P351+P338, P307+P311, P308+P313, P310, P312, P314, P320, P321, P330, P361, P363, P370+P378, P391, P403+P233, P403+P235, P405, P501
- Except where otherwise noted, data are given for materials in their standard state (at 25 °C [77 °F], 100 kPa). verify (what is ?) Infobox references

1,4-Dichlorobut-2-ene are organochlorine compounds with the formula ClCH_{2}CH=CHCH_{2}Cl. Cis and trans isomers exist. These compounds are intermediates in the industrial production of chloroprene. They are main impurity in technical grade chloroprene.

== Synthesis and reactions ==
1,4-Dichlorobut-2-ene (both isomers) are produced by chlorination of butadiene:

CH_{2}=CHCH=CH_{2} + Cl_{2} → ClCH_{2}CH=CHCH_{2}Cl

It is isomerized to 3,4-dichlorobut-1-ene by heating to temperatures of 60–120 °C in the presence of a catalyst:

ClCH_{2}CH=CHCH_{2}Cl → ClCH_{2}CHClCH=CH_{2}

The resulting 3,4-dichlorobut-1-ene is a precursor to chloroprene, the monomer for the synthetic rubber neoprene.

1,4-Dichlorobut-2-ene is a precursor to various heterocycles. The (E)-isomer is also one of the starting materials for the poriferic natural product sceptrin.
