= Thomas Hill (Unitarian) =

American clergyman (1818–1891)

The Reverend Thomas Hill
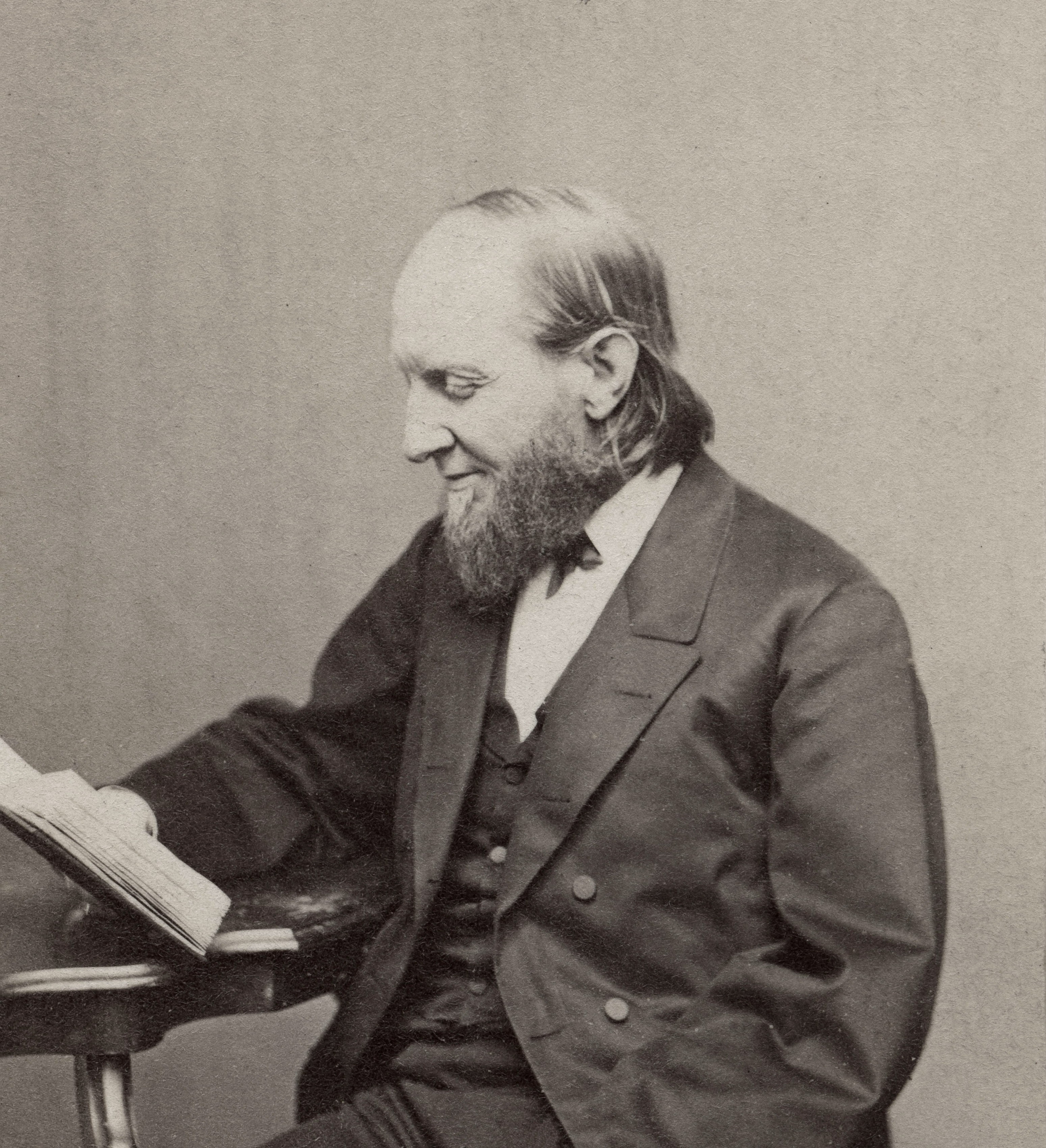

20th President of Harvard University
- In office 1862–1868
- Preceded by: Cornelius Conway Felton
- Succeeded by: Charles William Eliot

2nd President of Antioch College
- In office 1860–1862
- Preceded by: Horace Mann
- Succeeded by: Austin Craig

Personal details
- Born: January 7, 1818 New Brunswick, New Jersey, U.S.
- Died: November 21, 1891 (aged 73) Waltham, Massachusetts, U.S.
- Relatives: Henry Barker Hill (son)
- Profession: Clergyman and educator

Thomas Hill (January 7, 1818 – November 21, 1891) was an American Unitarian clergyman, mathematician, scientist, philosopher, and educator.

== Biography ==
Taught to read at an early age, Hill read voraciously and was well regarded for his capacious and accurate memory. His father taught him botany, and he took a delight in nature and devised scientific instruments, one that calculated eclipses and was subsequently awarded the Scott Medal by the Franklin Institute.

Though not formally educated in his youth, Hill briefly attended the Lower Dublin Academy in Holmesburg, Pennsylvania and the Leicester Academy in Massachusetts, now the Leicester campus of Becker College, leaving in 1837.

He earned his A.B. and D.Div. from Harvard University in 1843 and 1845 respectively. He was later made an honorary member of the Hasty Pudding. Hill was president of Antioch College from 1860 to 1862 until the Civil War forced the college to shut down; he then held the presidency of Harvard University from 1862 to 1868. Ill health caused his retirement from Harvard, but he was able to serve as official botanist during the Hassler Expedition circumnavigating South America through the Magellan Strait from Boston in December 1871 to San Francisco in August 1872. From 1873, he was head of the Unitarian parish in Portland, Maine.

In 1863, he was elected as a member of the American Philosophical Society. Hill claimed to have injured his testicle while gardening, an incident that made him wary of laboratory instruction at Harvard, warning students not to exert themselves too much in their studies.

Hill's home in Waltham, Massachusetts, where he began his career, is listed on the National Register of Historic Places.

Academic offices
Preceded by Cornelius Conway Felton	President of Harvard University; 1862–1868	Succeeded by Charles W. Eliot
Preceded by Horace Mann	President of Antioch College; 1860–1862	Succeeded by Austin Craig
