= Cookeite =

Mineral species of the silicate group

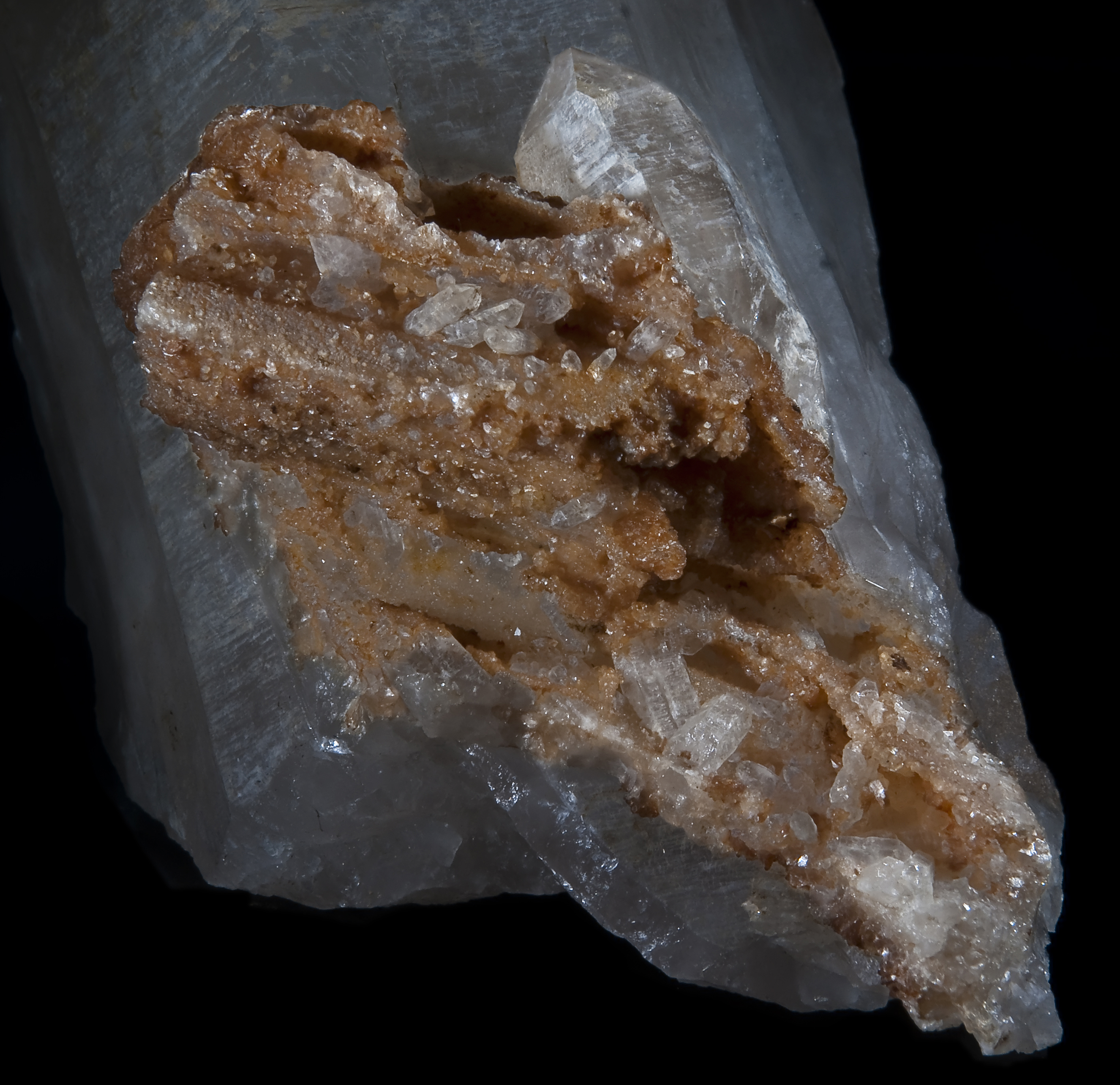
- Cookeite on quartz, Paris, Maine, topotype deposit

General
- Category: Phyllosilicate minerals
- Group: Chlorite group
- Formula: LiAl_{4}(Si_{3}Al)O_{10}(OH)_{8}
- Strunz classification: 09.EC.55
- Dana classification: 71.04.01.02
- Crystal system: monoclinic
- Crystal class: prismatic; C2 or Cc

Identification
- Color: white, green, brown, golden, pink
- Twinning: around [310]
- Cleavage: perfect over {001}
- Fracture: flexible
- Tenacity: 2,5
- Luster: pearly; silky
- Density: from 2.58 to 2.69
- Refractive index: α = 1,572–1,576, β = 1,579–1,584, γ = 1,589–1,6
- Birefringence: biaxial (+), 0,0170–0,0240; 2V = 35 to 60°
- Pleochroism: x = y: pale green to pink, z: colorless to pale yellow
- Ultraviolet fluorescence: cream yellow (SW)

Cookeite is a mineral species of the silicate group and the phyllosilicate subgroup, part of the chlorite family, with the formula LiAl_{4}(Si_{3}Al)O_{10}(OH)_{8}. This soft, low-density mineral of variable color has a crystalline structure made up of alternating layers LiAl_{2}(OH)_{6} and Al_{2}O_{4}(OH)_{2}Si_{8}O_{12} having several polytypes. Cookeite is often found as a product of hydrothermal alteration of silicates in pegmatites. It forms at relatively low temperatures (below 200 °C) and variable pressures.

== History ==
=== Inventor and etymology ===
Cookeite was described in 1866 by mineralogist George Jarvis Brush and dedicated to Josiah Parsons Cooke (1827-1894), an American mineralogist and chemist at Harvard University, Cambridge, Massachusetts.

=== Topotype ===
The topotype deposit is located in the Mount Mica Quarry, Paris, Oxford County, Maine, USA.

Type samples are deposited at Yale University, New Haven, Connecticut, USA (No. 2.3728).

== Physico-chemical properties ==
=== Determination criteria ===
Cookeite is a white mineral with green, brown, golden, or pinkish hues of varying intensity. It occurs as pseudo-hexagonal crystals, spherules, radiated or fibrous aggregates. It has a pearly or silky sheen, and is transparent to translucent. It is flexible but inelastic, with perfect cleavage on the {001} plane and micaceous fracture (formation of thin sheets or flakes).

Cookeite is a soft mineral, as its hardness only ranges from 2.5 to 3.5 on the Mohs scale. It is also not very dense, with a measured density ranging from 2.58 to 2.69. Cookeite has a pale green to pink pleochroism along the X and Y axes, and is colorless to pale yellow along the Z axis. It has a white line and fluoresces creamy-yellow fairly regularly.

=== Chemical composition ===
Cookeite, with the formula LiAl_{4}(Si_{3}Al)O_{10}(OH)_{8}, has a molecular mass of 522.16 u, or 8.67 × 10^{−25} kg. It is therefore composed of the following elements:

Chemical composition of the mineral
Element	Number (formula)	Atomic mass (u)	% of molecular mass
Lithium	1	6,94	1, 33%
Silicium	3	84,26	16,14 %
Aluminium	5	134,91	25,84 %
Hydrogen	8	8,06	1,54 %
Oxygen	18	287,99	55,15 %
	Total : 35 elements	Total : 522,16 u	Total : 100%

Impurities often found in cookeite include iron, manganese, magnesium, calcium, sodium, and potassium.

The silicon in the silicate layers may be partly substituted by aluminum, boron or beryllium, with a fairly constant (Al,B,Be)/Si ratio.

=== Crystallochemistry ===
Cookeite is a polytype of chlorite.

According to Strunz's classification, it belongs to the class of silicates (IX), more precisely micaceous phyllosilicates (9.E) composed of tetrahedral and octahedral lattices (9.EC)

Members of micaceous phyllosilicate group 9.EC.55
Mineral	Formula	Point group	Space group
Baileychlore	(Zn,Al)_{3}[Fe_{2}Al][Si_{3}AlO_{10}](OH)_{8}	1	C1
Borocookeite	Li_{1+3x}Al_{4-x}(BSi_{3})O_{10}(OH,F)_{8} (x ≤ 0,33)	2/m	C2/m
Chamosite	(Fe,Mg,Fe)_{5}Al(Si_{3}Al)O_{10}(OH,O)_{8}	2/m	C2/m
Clinochlore	(Mg,Fe)_{5}Al(Si_{3}Al)O_{10}(OH)_{8}	2/m	C2/m
Cookeite	LiAl_{4}(Si_{3}Al)O_{10}(OH)_{8}	2 or 2/m	C1, C2 or Cc
Donbassite	Al_{2}[Al_{2,33}][Si_{3}AlO_{10}](OH)_{8}	2/m	C2/m
Franklinfurnaceite	Ca(Fe,Al)Mn_{4}Zn_{2}Si_{2}O_{10}(OH)_{8}	2	C2
Glagolevite	NaMg_{6}[Si_{3}AlO_{10}](OH,O)_{8}·H_{2}O	1	C1
Gonyerite	Mn_{3}[Mn_{3}Fe][(Si,Fe)_{4}O_{10}](OH,O)_{8}	orthorhombic pseudo-hexagonal	unknown
Nimite	(Ni,Mg,Fe)_{5}Al(Si_{3}Al)O_{10}(OH)_{8}	2/m	C2/m
Odinite	(Fe,Mg,Al,Fe,Ti,Mn)_{2,5}(Si,Al)_{2}O_{5}(OH)_{4}	m	Cm
Orthochamosite	(Fe,Mg,Fe)_{5}Al(Si_{3}Al)O_{10}(OH,O)_{8}	orthorhombic pseudo-hexagonal	unknown
Pennantite	Mn_{5}Al(Si_{3}Al)O_{10}(OH)_{8}	2/m	C2/m
Sudoite	Mg_{2}(Al,Fe)_{3}Si_{3}AlO_{10}(OH)_{8}	2/m	C2/m

According to Dana Classification System, cookeite is found in the phyllosilicate class (class 71), whose silicate layers are formed by six-membered rings with alternating 2:1 layers (two layers of T tetrahedra around a layer of O octahedra) and 1:1 layers (isolated layer of octahedra) (71.04), and more precisely in the chlorite group (71.04.01).

=== Crystallography ===
==== Overview ====
Cookeite generally crystallizes in the monoclinic crystal system. Its space group can be C2, Cc (monoclinic) or C1 (triclinic).

Its structure consists of a stack of layers containing metallic elements and aluminosilicate layers. The coordination polyhedron of the metallic elements is an octahedron, whose vertices are O^{2-} anions or hydroxyl (OH)^{−} groups. The aluminosilicate layers contain an octahedrally coordinated aluminum layer and two aluminosilicate layers formed by six-membered (Si,Al)_{6}O_{18} rings of (Si,Al)O_{4} tetrahedra. The layers are connected by hydrogen bonds.

There are two types of octahedral layers, denoted O and O', which differ in their degree of filling. Cookeites belong to the "di, trioctahedral" chlorites, i.e. they possess:

- a layer of O octahedra, with all sites occupied by metallic elements (trioctahedral layer);
- a less dense layer of O' octahedra, only two-thirds of whose sites are occupied (dioctahedral layer). Unoccupied octahedral sites are called "vacant sites". This layer is surrounded by two layers of six-membered rings of aluminosilicate tetrahedra, noted T, to form T-O'-T layers.
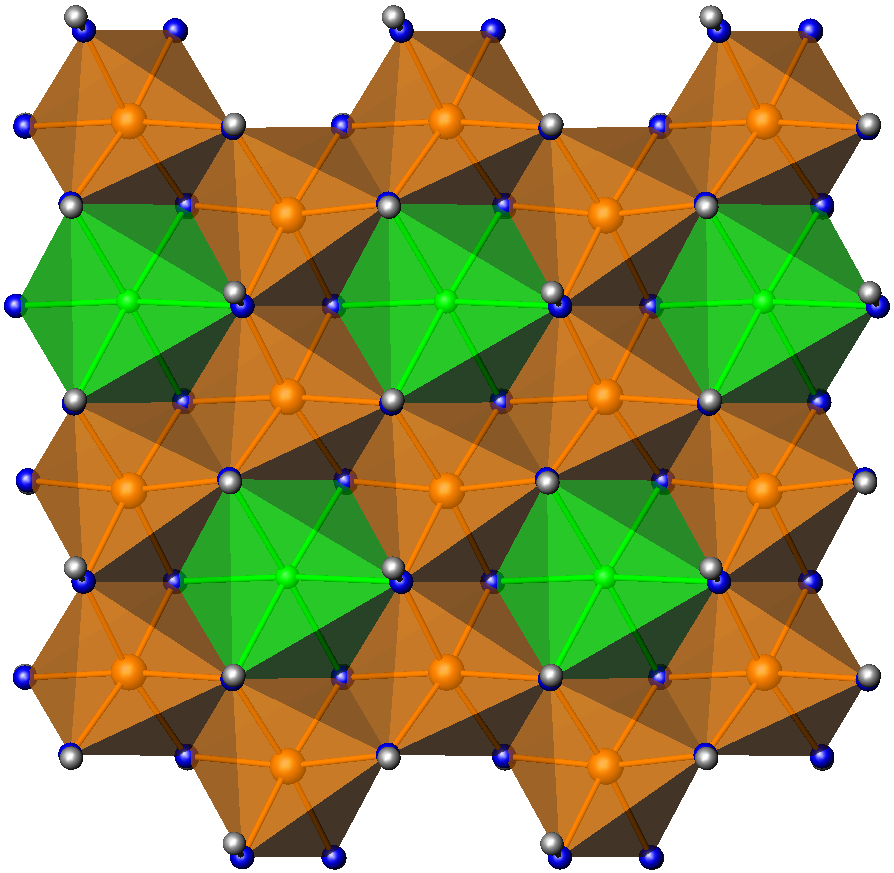
Trioctahedral layer O, of chemical composition LiAl_{2}(OH)_{6}.

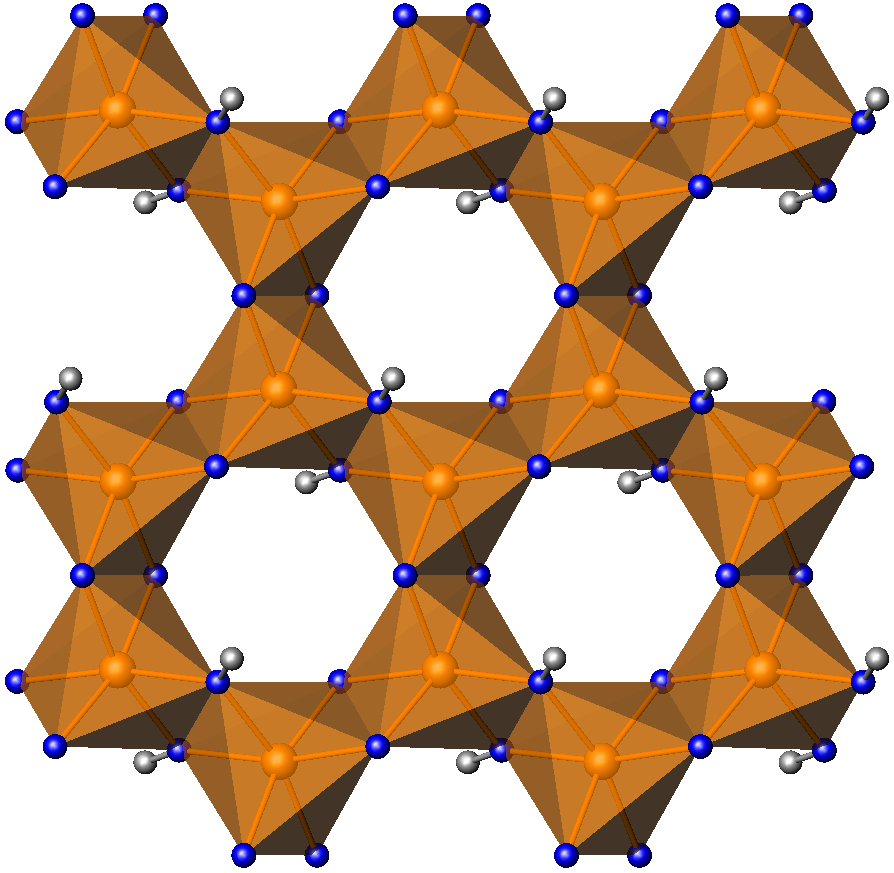
Dioctahedral layer O', of chemical composition Al_{2}O_{4}(OH)_{2}.

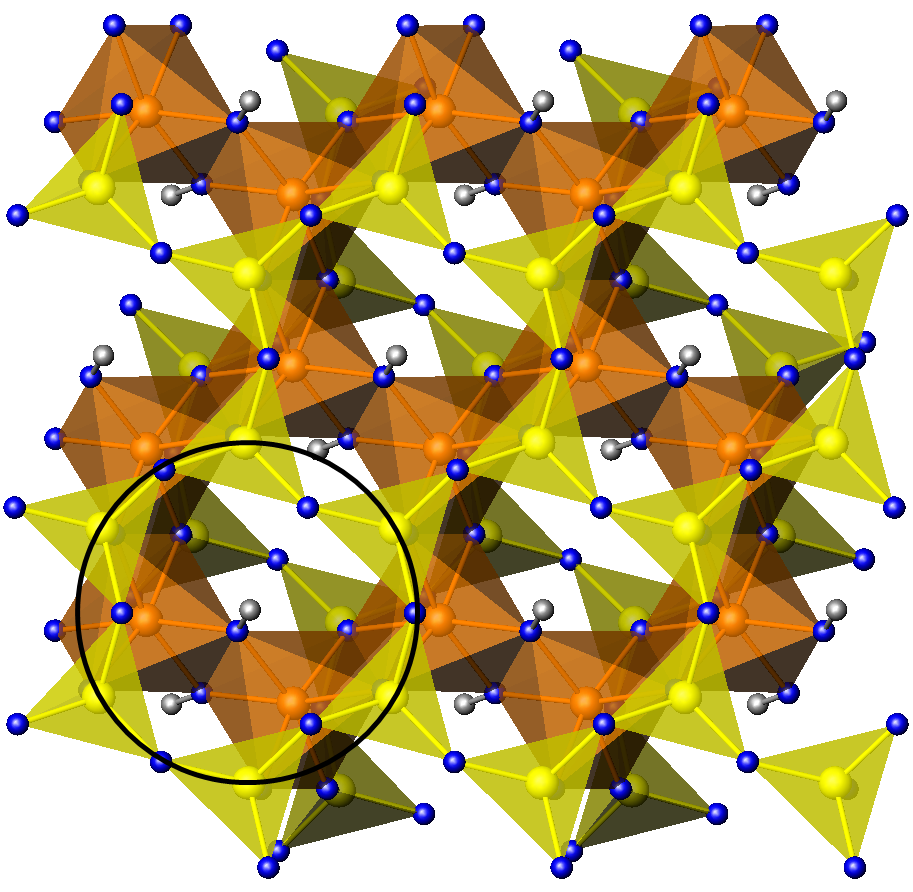
Aluminosilicate layer T-O'-T. The black circle indicates six-membered rings.

The O layer contains the metal cations Al^{3+} and Li^{+}. The distribution of these cations is not ordered in the structure: octahedral sites can host either Al^{3+} or Li^{+}, but the occupation of the sites by these cations varies from cell to cell in a non-periodic fashion. For this reason, octahedral sites are referred to as "mixed occupancy" sites. The occupancy of a site by different chemical species is described by its occupancy percentages, i.e. by the probability of finding a certain chemical species there. For example, the trioctahedral O layer of r-cookeite shown above has three different sites, (Note: Since a perfect crystal is considered an ordered, infinite stack of atoms, the layers contain an infinite number of sites. However, these sites can be grouped into "symmetry-equivalent sites", i.e. the application of symmetry operations of the crystal space group on a particular site of the asymmetric unit of the conventional lattice allows all other equivalent sites in the crystal to be found.) two of which are predominantly occupied by aluminum (orange octahedra) and the third by lithium (green octahedra). Similarly, the tetrahedral sites of the six-membered (Si,Al)_{6}O_{18} rings are of mixed silicon and aluminum occupancy (yellow in the figure).

The structure of cookeite can be seen as an alternating stack of brucite-type layers and talc-type layers. Indeed, brucite Mg(OH)_{2} consists of Mg_{3}OH_{6} layers, and talc Mg_{3}(Si_{4}O_{10})(OH)_{2} consists of Mg_{2}O_{4}(OH)_{2}Si_{8}O_{12} layers. In cookeite, Li^{+} and Al^{3+} cations take the place of Mg^{2+} cations in brucite-type layers (O layers) and talc (O' layers).

The stacking of layers is not identical in all cookeites: there are several polytypes, distinguished by the length of the stacking period (lattice parameter c for monoclinic cookeites).

==== Cookeite r ====
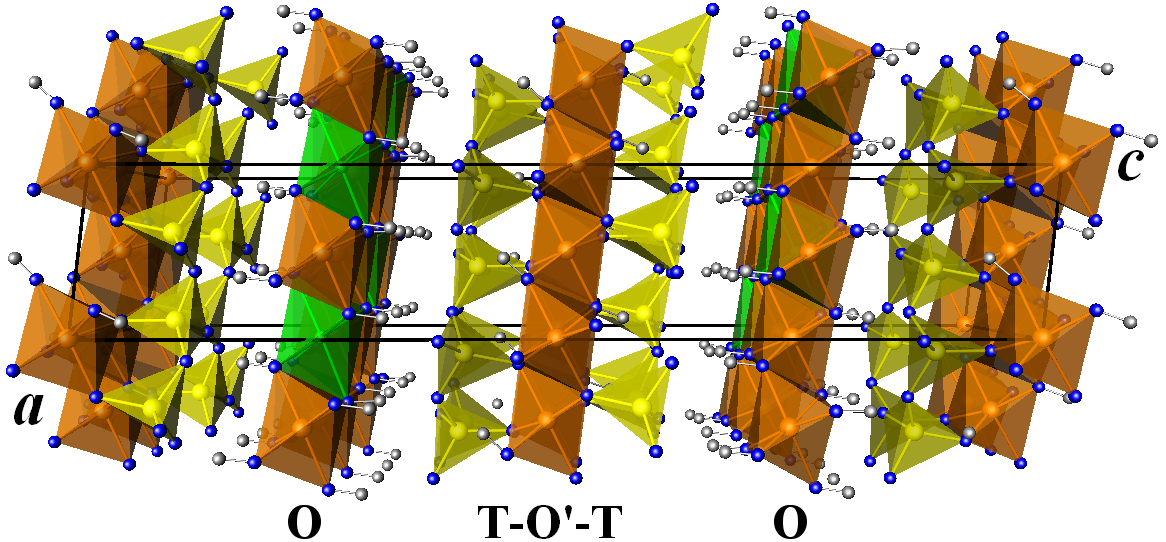
Structure of the r-cookeite, projected along the b-direction (perspective view). Yellow: Si, orange: Al, green: Li, blue: O, grey: H. The six-membered ring structure of the T layers is particularly visible in the left-hand layer.

Cookeite "r" is a rare lithium-rich cookeite with the formula Al_{2}(Al_{2}Li)(Si_{3,04}Al_{0,96})O_{10}(OH)_{8}. It crystallizes in the space group Cc, with Z=4 form units per conventional cell. Its cell parameters are ɑ= 5,158 Å, b = 8,940 Å, c = 28,498 Å and β = 96,6° (unit cell volume V = 1 305,41 Å^{3}) and its volumetric mass density is 2,66 g/cm^{3}.

Its structure consists of an alternating stack of two types of layers, noted O and T-O'-T, parallel to the plane (ɑ, b).

The O layers, with a composition LiAl_{2}(OH)_{6}^{+}, are made up of octahedrons (Al,Li)(OH)_{6} connected by their edges. All octahedra are of mixed aluminum and lithium occupancy. O-layer cations are distributed over three non-equivalent sites by symmetry. Two-thirds of the sites are preferentially occupied by Al^{3+} à 91% (orange octahedrons in the figure opposite), a third of the sites contain 82% of Li^{+} (green octahedra). The average (Al,Li)-OH bond length is 1.95 Å for octahedra containing predominantly aluminum and 2.11 Å for the others.

The T-O'-T layers, with a composition Al_{2}O_{4}(OH)_{2}Si_{8}O_{12}, are made up of an O' layer of octahedrons AlO_{4}(OH)_{2} containing exclusively aluminium, surrounded by two T layers of tetrahedrons (Si,Al)_{4}O_{10}, structured in the form of six-membered rings (Si,Al)_{6}O_{18} in which the tetrahedrons (Si,Al)O_{4} layers have a mixed occupancy of silicon and aluminum. The Al^{3+} cations in the O' layers are symmetrically distributed over two non-equivalent sites, with an average Al-O bond length of 1.92 Å. The cations (Si^{4+},Al^{3+}) layers are distributed over four non-equivalent sites, with an average (Si,Al)-O bond length of 1.66 Å. There are two T-O'-T layers in the r-cookeite: the first is located at the edge of the cell, around the (x, y, z=0) coordinate plane, and the second is located in the center of the cell, around the (x, y, z=1/2) (Note: Since a cell is defined by the coordinates 0 ≤ x < 1, 0 ≤ y < 1, and 0 ≤ z < 1, the T-O'-T layer around the (x, y, z =1) coordinate plane is part of the neighboring cell in the crystal.) coordinate plane. These two layers are identical and equivalent through the translatory mirror c with coordinates (x, y, z=1/4). (Note: This mirror applied to a point with coordinates (x, y, z) creates its image by symmetry with coordinates (x+1/2, y+1/2, 1/2-z).) Since the O' layer has only one vacant site in the cell, when the layers are stacked, the vacant sites of the two layers are shifted in the (a, b).

==== Other cookeites ====
A cookeite with the formula (Al_{1,85}Fe_{0,13})(Li_{0,65}Al_{1,96})(Si_{3,4}Al_{0,6})O_{10,35}(OH)_{7,65} from the Djalair bauxite deposit in Central Asia has been described in triclinic space group C1 (Z = 2 form units per cell), with cell parameters = 5.14 Å, = 8.90 Å, = 14.15 Å, α = 90.55°, β = 96.2° and γ = 90° (cell volume V = 643.49 Å^{3}). It has a volumetric mass density of 2,69 g/cm^{3}. Its structure is noted as IIa in the nomenclature of chlorite polytypes.

The cell parameter of cookeite IIa is half that of r-cookeite: the difference between these two structures is due to the stacking of the O and T-O'-T layers. Within the layers themselves, there is no notable structural difference between this cookeite and the r-cookeite. However, the dioctahedral O' layers of cookeite IIa are all identical and ordered so as to have the vacant sites one above the other in the stacking direction of the layers, whereas in r-cookeite, due to the translatory mirror c, the vacant sites of the O' layers do not overlap.

Note: there are two space groups in the triclinic system: P1. The symmetry of this cookeite is P1; its description in the unconventional space group C1, inducing an artificially doubled cell in the (ɑ, b) plane with respect to the primitive conventional cell, makes it easier to compare its structure with that of monoclinic cookeites.

== Mineral deposits ==
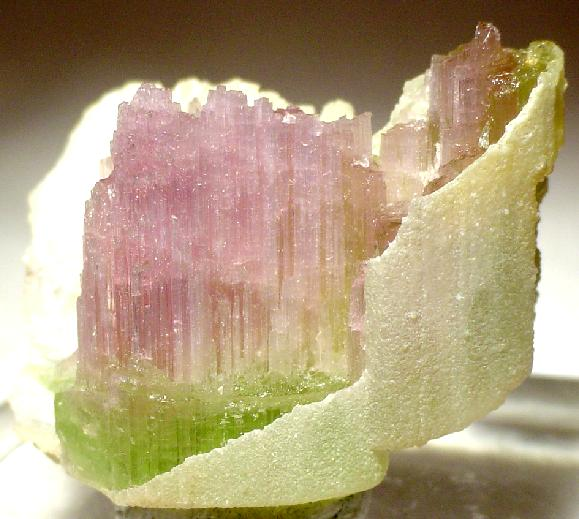
A thin layer of cookeite encircles a green elbaite at the base, mauve-colored at the top.

=== Geology and associated minerals ===
Cookeite is often a product of the hydrothermal alteration of lithium-bearing minerals, such as lepidolite or certain tourmalines, in pegmatites, and can also occur in hydrothermal veins in the primary state.

It is often associated with the following minerals: albite, lepidolite, microcline, petalite, quartz, spodumene and tourmaline.

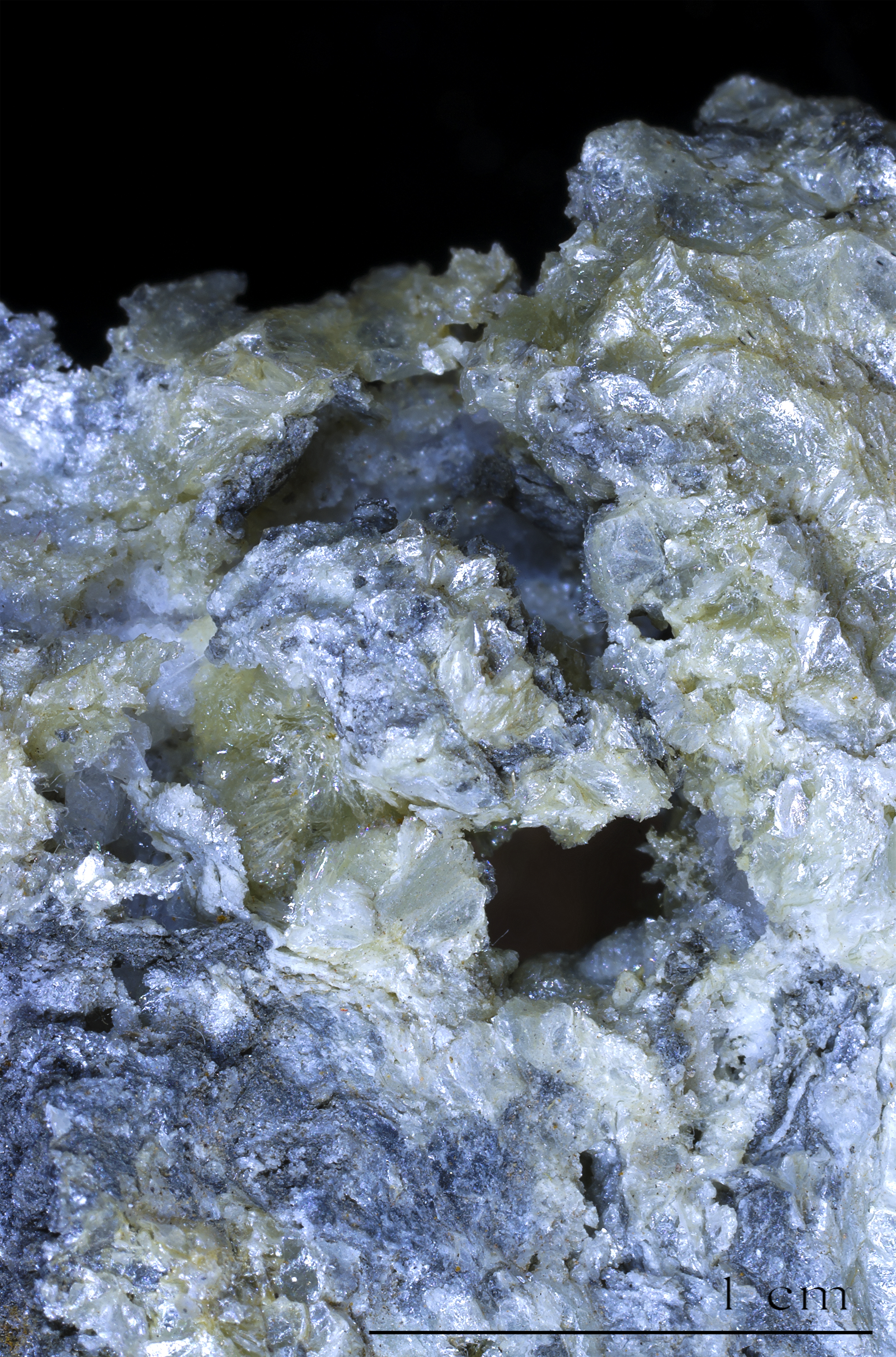
Specimen from Couledoux, Haute-Garonne, France.

=== Productive deposits of remarkable specimens ===
- Germany

Uranium mine in the Krunkelbach valley, Menzenschwand, Black Forest, Baden-Württemberg.

- Bolivia

Siglo Veinte (XX) mine, Llallagua, Rafael Bustillo province, Potosí department.

- Canada

Tanco Mine, Lac-du-Bonnet (Bernic Lake), Manitoba.

- China

Yaogangxian Mine, Xian de Yizhang, Chenzhou, Hunan.

- United States

Mount Mica quarry, Paris, Oxford County, Maine (topotype)

- France

Goutasson, Couledoux, Haute-Garonne, Occitania.

- Madagascar

Tsarafara Sud, Sahatany valley, Sahatany pegmatite fields, Vakinankaratra, Antananarivo province.

- Czech Republic

Huber Stock, Krásno, Horní Slavkov, district de Sokolov, région de Karlovy Vary, Bohemia.

== Mineral growth ==
Cookeite is a product of silicate alteration. In low-grade metamorphic zones, it is associated with pyrophyllite. In high-grade metamorphic zones, it is formed mainly by the alteration of kyanite.

A study of samples collected in the Ardlethan stanniferous field in Australia showed that cookeite forms in the porous interstices of granitic breccias containing quartz, sulfides (such as pyrite), cassiterite, tourmaline, and fluorite. It occurs at relatively low temperatures (between 150 °C and 200 °C) under hydrothermal conditions, after other minerals have formed in the breccia. The lithium in cookeite is the result of hydrothermal transport of magmatic fluids.

Pressure seems to have the greatest influence on the degree of crystallinity and composition of the cookeite. At low pressures, the stacking of layers is not very regular and the cookeite may contain many substitutional impurities. At higher pressures (above 10 kbar), the structure is more ordered, resulting in a higher degree of crystallinity and purer cookeite. However, this direct relationship between pressure and structure has been called into question by the discovery of several samples of different crystallinity in the same sample from a low-pressure zone. Cookeites from high pressure always exhibit a high degree of crystallinity, but ordered cookeites can also be found at low pressure. The low-crystallinity crystals assumed to be characteristic of low pressures simply haven't yet reached the thermodynamic equilibrium of ordered crystals, due to other factors such as deformation of the medium or the chemical environment.

== Appendix ==
=== Bibliography ===
- Edward Salisbury Dana (1892) The System of Mineralogy of James Dwight Dana, 1837–1868, John Wiley & Sons, New York (NY), 6th ed., 1134 p., p. 625
- William Alexander Deer, R. A. Howie and J. Zussman, Rock-forming minerals, vol. 3 : Sheet silicates, John Wiley & Sons, 1963, p. 131-163.
- Bailey, S. W.; Lister, Judith S. (1989). "Structures, Compositions, and X-Ray Diffraction Identification of Dioctahedral Chlorites". Clays and Clay Minerals. 37 (3): 193–202. Bibcode:1989CCM....37..193B. doi:10.1346/CCMN.1989.0370301.
