= Rev. Thomas Hill House =

Historic house in Massachusetts, United States

- U.S. National Register of Historic Places
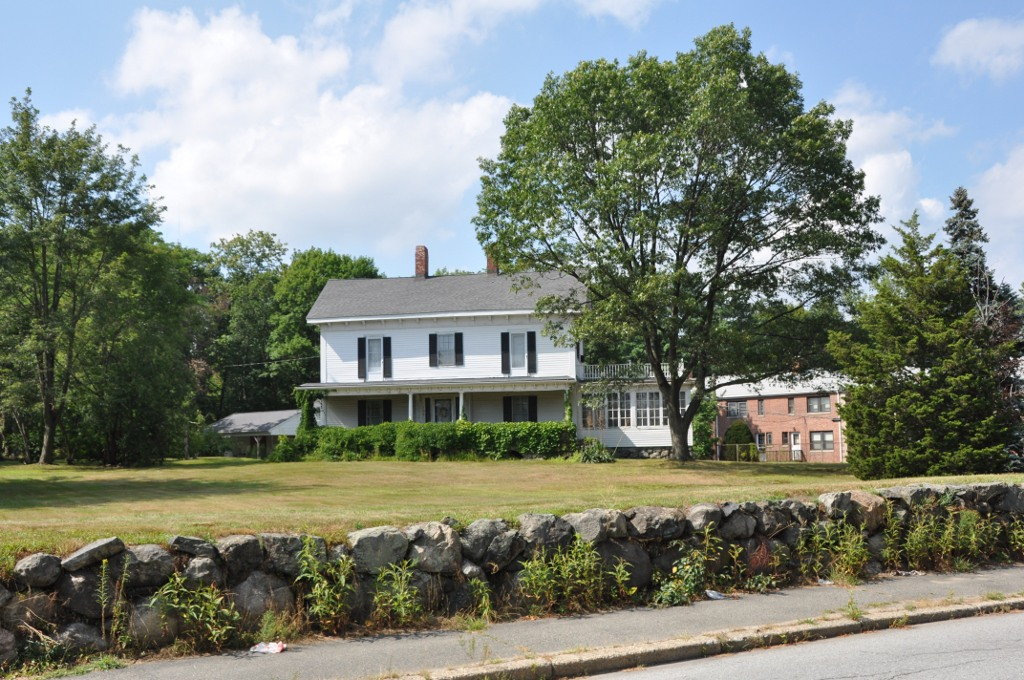

- Location within Massachusetts Location within the United States
- Location: 132 Church St., Waltham, Massachusetts
- Coordinates: 42°22′49″N 71°13′57″W
- Built: 1845
- Architectural style: Greek Revival, Italianate
- MPS: Waltham MRA
- NRHP reference No.: 89001528
- Added to NRHP: September 28, 1989

The Rev. Thomas Hill House is a historic house in Waltham, Massachusetts. The 2 1/2-story wood-frame house was built in 1845 for the noted clergyman (and later president of Harvard University) Thomas Hill. He was resident at the house while he served as minister of Waltham's First Parish, and for two other periods before his death in 1891. The house is a transitional Greek Revival-Italianate structure, three bays wide, with a side-gable roof that has bracketed eaves.

The house was listed on the National Register of Historic Places in 1989.

== See also ==
- National Register of Historic Places listings in Waltham, Massachusetts
