= Lincoln's Birthday Committee for Democracy and Intellectual Freedom =

The Lincoln's Birthday Committee for Democracy and Intellectual Freedom (LBCDIF) was an antifascist organization of scientists founded by Franz Boas in 1938 to discredit the theories of race being forwarded by the Nazis in Germany.

In the 1930s Franz Boas was one of the first scientists to become aware of the immense prestige and influence of scientists in that era. Even at his advanced age Boas wanted to find a way to use the influence of scientists to promote human welfare. At Columbia University he collaborated with Ruth Benedict, Leslie Dunn, Robert Lynd, Walter Rautenstrauch, Harold Urey and other members of the University Federation for Democracy and Intellectual Freedom to find a unifying political position that would bring scientists of all disciplines together on a common front. He decided antifascism was such a position, and based on his collaborations wrote the Manifesto on Freedom in Science. In 1938 the Manifesto was released with 1,284 signatures of prominent scientists, including Roger Adams, Robert Oppenheimer and Albert Einstein (see: Einstein Letter to LBCDIF). Boas used the excitement generated by the Manifesto to launch the LBCDIF. Twenty-six meetings were organized to uphold the principles of the Manifesto, and the success of these meetings encouraged the organizers to expand the Birthday Committee to an ongoing group called the American Committee for Democracy and Intellectual Freedom (ACDIF).
