= Stomatex =

Stomatex is a high performance patented fabric which is inspired by the physics of transpiring plant leaves and invented by Nigel Middleton.

== Production ==
Stomatex is made from the closed-cell foam neoprene, a synthetic rubber in a pattern of dome-shaped chambers, each with a tiny pore in the centre.

== Usage ==
Stomatex is typically used for outdoor clothing, due to its ability to balance thermal insulation with water protection. It is also used in outdoor recreational clothing for snow sports and field sports.

== See also ==
- Gore-Tex
- Neoprene
