= 2,3-Dichlorobutadiene =

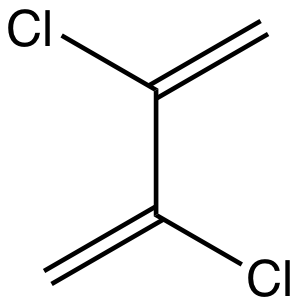

Names
- Preferred IUPAC name 2,3-Dichlorobuta-1,3-diene
- Other names 2,3-Dichloro-1,3-butadiene

Identifiers
CAS Number	1653-19-6
3D model (JSmol)	Interactive image
ChemSpider	14699
ECHA InfoCard	100.015.202
EC Number	216-721-0
PubChem CID	15447
UNII	SG9RMT8EAJ
CompTox Dashboard (EPA)	DTXSID1027423
- InChI: InChI=1S/C4H4Cl2/c1-3(5)4(2)6/h1-2H2 Key: LIFLRQVHKGGNSG-UHFFFAOYSA-N
- SMILES: C=C(C(=C)Cl)Cl

Properties
Chemical formula	C_{4}H_{4}Cl_{2}
Molar mass	122.98 g·mol^{−1}
Appearance	Colorless liquid
Density	1.1829 g/cm^{3}
Boiling point	98 °C (208 °F; 371 K)

Hazards
- GHS labelling
Pictograms	(GHS02: Flammable) (GHS06: Toxic) (GHS07: Exclamation mark) (GHS08: Health hazard) (GHS09: Environmental hazard)
Signal word	Danger
Hazard statements	H225, H301, H302, H304, H315, H319, H330, H335, H411
Precautionary statements	P210, P233, P240, P241, P242, P243, P260, P264, P270, P271, P273, P280, P284, P301+P310, P301+P312, P302+P352, P303+P361+P353, P304+P340, P305+P351+P338, P310, P312, P320, P321, P330, P331, P332+P313, P337+P313, P362, P370+P378, P391, P403+P233, P403+P235, P405, P501
- Except where otherwise noted, data are given for materials in their standard state (at 25 °C [77 °F], 100 kPa). Infobox references

2,3-Dichlorobutadiene is a chlorinated derivative of butadiene. This colorless liquid is prone to polymerization, more so than 2-chlorobutadiene. It is used to produce specialized neoprene rubbers.

It can be prepared by the copper-catalyzed isomerization of dichlorobutynes. Alternatively dehydrochlorination of 2,3,4-trichloro-1-butene:

CH_{2}=C(Cl)CH(Cl)CH_{2}Cl + NaOH → CH_{2}=C(Cl)C(Cl)=CH_{2} + NaCl + H_{2}O

2,3-Dichlorobutadiene is a precursor to 2,3-diarylbutadienes.
