= Roger Adams =

American organic chemist

- Roger Adams
- Born: January 2, 1889; Boston, Massachusetts, U.S.
- Died: July 6, 1971 (aged 82); Urbana, Illinois, U.S.
- Education: Harvard University
- Known for: Adams' catalyst, Hexahydrocannabinol, Adamsite
- Awards: William H. Nichols Medal (1927); Elliott Cresson Medal (1944); Davy Medal (1945); Priestley Medal (1946); Perkin Medal (1954); American Institute of Chemists Gold Medal (1964)
- Scientific career
- Fields: Organic chemistry
- Workplaces: University of Berlin, Kaiser Wilhelm Institute for Chemistry, University of Illinois at Urbana-Champaign
- Doctoral advisors: H. A. Torrey, Charles Loring Jackson
- Doctoral students: Ernest H. Volwiler, Samuel M. McElvain, Wallace Carothers, William Edward Hanford, Edward Marion Augustus Chandler

Roger Adams (January 2, 1889 – July 6, 1971) was an American organic chemist who developed the eponymous Adams' catalyst, and helped determine the composition of natural substances such as complex vegetable oils and plant alkaloids. He isolated and identified CBD and Δ8-Tetrahydrocannabinol in 1940. As head of the chemistry department at the University of Illinois from 1926 to 1954, he influenced graduate education in America, taught over 250 Ph.D. students and postgraduate students, and served in military science during World War I and World War II.

== Early life ==
Adams was born in Boston, Massachusetts to railroad official Austin W. Adams and Lydia Curtis, and grew up in a prosperous neighborhood in South Boston, the last child in a gifted family that included Adams's three older sisters (two went to Radcliffe College and one to Smith College). Adams was part of the prominent Adams family, and was descended from John Adams's grandfather.

Adams attending Boston Latin School and Cambridge Latin High School (now called Cambridge Rindge and Latin). In 1900, the family moved to Cambridge, which was closer to the two colleges.

Adams entered Harvard University in 1905 and completed the requirements for a bachelor's degree in three years. In his first year, he earned a John Harvard Honorary Scholarship by getting four As, and in his last year, he took advanced courses and began research in organic chemistry under H.A. Torrey. His years at Harvard were undistinguished, earning high grades in chemistry (his major) and mining (his minor). After graduation from Harvard in 1909, he worked towards his Ph.D. at Radcliffe College supported by a teaching assistantship. Torrey died unexpectedly in 1910, so Adams finished his Ph.D. under Charles Loring Jackson, George Shannon Forbes, and Latham Clarke. In 1912 he was initiated as a brother of Alpha Chi Sigma at Omicron chapter at Harvard. As an outstanding Ph.D. of 1912, Adams received a Parker Traveling Scholarship for 1912 and 1913, which he used to work at the laboratory of Emil Fischer and Otto Diels in Berlin, Germany and that of Richard Willstätter in Dahlem outside of Berlin.

After returning from Europe in 1913, Adams returned to Harvard and worked as a research assistant for Charles L. Jackson for $800 a year. During the next three years, he taught organic chemistry at Harvard and Radcliffe, initiated the first elementary organic chemistry laboratory at Harvard and began his own research program. Several other prominent contemporaries of Adams at Harvard Graduate School were Elmer Keiser Bolton, Farrington Daniels, Frank C. Whitmore, James B. Sumner and James Bryant Conant.

== Academic career ==
In 1916, Adams accepted an offer of an assistant professorship from William A. Noyes, head of the chemistry department at University of Illinois at Urbana-Champaign. He began a career at UIUC that would span 56 years. Adams succeeded Noyes as department head in 1926, and remained in that position until 1954. During this time, Adams made several well-known discoveries.

Roger Adams and his students developed the so-called Adams' catalyst, which is one of the most readily-prepared and active catalysts for hydrogenation reactions. The catalyst can be prepared by fusing sodium nitrate with chloroplatinic acid or ammonium chloroplatinate. Adams's group also developed a low-pressure apparatus for using the catalyst, which had a profound effect in the synthesis and structural elucidation of organic compounds as well as biochemical compounds.

Working at the Noyes Laboratory, Adams and his more than 250 graduate students made many significant discoveries:

- Synthesis of chloralkyl esters by combining aldehydes and acyl chlorides.
- That aliphatic acid anhydrides effectively form ketones in the Friedel-Crafts reaction.
- Determination of the structure of disalicylaldehyde and dehydroacetic acid.
- A method of synthesizing polyhydroxyanthraquinones with precisely-known stereochemistry using phthalides.
- Determination of the structures of leprosy drugs chaulmoogric acid and hydnocarpic acid and the synthesis of their dihydro derivatives.
- Determination of the structure of gossypol for the cottonseed industry.
- Isolated and identified cannabidiol from Cannabis sativa, showed its relationship to cannabinol and tetrahydrocannabinol.
- Synthesized many psychoactive cannabinol and tetrahydrocannabinol analogs.
- Studies of Senecio and Crotalaria alkaloids that opened two fields of study: pyrrolizidine and large-ring diester chemistry.

At UIUC, Adams took charge of the Organic Chemical Manufactures ("prep labs") started by his predecessor C.G. Derick for the synthesis of organic compounds from Germany that were cut off by the Blockade of Germany. The lab was expanded and reorganized with the help of students, particularly Ernest H. Volwiler and C.S. (Speed) Marvel. Strict cost accounting procedures were implemented in the lab, so that it became a financial as well as scientific success. The tested procedures developed in the lab led to the annual publication of the journal Organic Syntheses, which James Bryant Conant referred to as the "Adams Annual".

Adams vigorously researched methods of preparing local anaesthetics with Oliver Kamm who was also on the faculty of UIUC and a consultant to Abbott Laboratories in a relationship that lasted into the 1960s. Ernest H. Volwiler, Adams's first Ph.D. student, joined Abbott as a chemist in 1918. In 1917, Adams was drawn into research for the U.S. Army into poison gases at American University in Washington, D.C.; There he and Conant headed research groups and E.P. Kohler, an old faculty friend of Adams from Harvard, was in charge of the Offense Section.

Adams's return to UIUC began a period (1918–1926) of intense research, with 45 Ph.D. students that resulted in 73 publications.

In July 1940, Vannevar Bush was working to mobilize American scientists in the World War II war effort. Bush wanted to bring Adams into the National Defense Research Committee that he was organizing for President Franklin D. Roosevelt. Many believed that Adams was the leading organic chemist in the United States, and Adams friend and former Harvard colleague James Bryant Conant was intent on Adams leading the effort to develop new explosives and create synthetic chemicals. However, Bush's efforts were stalled in getting Adams a security clearance. The Army cleared Adams, but the Navy refused.

At this time the Federal Bureau of Investigation under the direction of J. Edgar Hoover was doing surveillance on "suspect American citizens" and had been keeping a file on Roger Adams. The FBI had informed Hoover that Adams was a leading member of an apparent Communist front group called the Lincoln's Birthday Committee for the Advancement of Science. The FBI also had information that Adams was a contributing member of a suspect Japanese propaganda magazine. Adams was also suspect in the eyes of the FBI because he was doing studies into the chemical mechanisms by which the plant Cannabis sativa (marijuana) affects the brain; these studies also directly led to first synthesizing of the cannabinoid known as Hexahydrocannabinol. The plant had been effectively banned by the passage of the 1937 Marijuana Tax Act. For the purposes of this research, Adams had obtained red oil extract of the plant legally from the United States Department of the Treasury. In 1939, this was the main focus of Adams's work. For these reasons, the Office of Naval Intelligence said it would never approve security clearance for Adams.

Hoover saw that political pressure was building to give Adams security clearance and that the FBI might have its facts wrong, so eventually backed down, indicating that "Professor Adams" is a very common name and there may be some confusion. However, Hoover continued to be suspicious of the political loyalties of the scientists involved in the World War II mobilization because of their internationalist worldview.

In the end Roger Adams got his security clearance and took charge of a successful effort to manufacture synthetic rubber to replace natural rubber supplies from the Far East that had been cut off by the war. This was a continuation of the work done by E.K. Bolton (Adams's friend from Harvard) at DuPont.

In Adams's case, the FBI had much of its information wrong. Adams was politically active, but not affiliated with any group called the Lincoln's Birthday Committee for the Advancement of Science. He was a member of the Lincoln's Birthday Committee for Democracy and Intellectual Freedom (LBCDIF), which was founded by the prominent anthropologist Franz Boas to discredit Nazi racial policies.

Because of Adams' significant contribution to the field, in 1959, the Roger Adams Award was established as an ACS National Award to recognize outstanding contributions to the field of organic chemistry. The award is given every other year where the award address is provided at the National Organic Chemistry Symposium, which is organized by the ACS Division of Organic Chemistry.

Roger Adams was inducted as a Laureate of The Lincoln Academy of Illinois and awarded the Order of Lincoln (the State's highest honor) by the Governor of Illinois in 1967 in the area of Science.

== Awards and honors ==
- Elected Member of the American Academy of Arts and Sciences (1926)
- William H. Nichols Medal (1927)
- Elected Member of the United States National Academy of Sciences (1929)
- Elected Member of the American Philosophical Society (1935)
- Willard Gibbs Award (1936)
- Elliott Cresson Medal (1944)
- Ira Remsen Award (1946)
- Priestley Medal of the American Chemical Society (1946)
- Perkin Medal (1954)
- Charles Lathrop Parsons Award for public service, American Chemical Society (1958)
- Franklin Medal (1960)
- Golden Plate Award of the American Academy of Achievement (1961)
- National Medal of Science (1964)
- American Institute of Chemists Gold Medal (1964)
- Alpha Chi Sigma Hall of Fame (1989)
- Roger Adams was inducted as a Laureate of The Lincoln Academy of Illinois and awarded the Order of Lincoln (the State's highest honor) by the Governor of Illinois in 1967 in the area of Science.
