= James B. Sumner =

American chemist

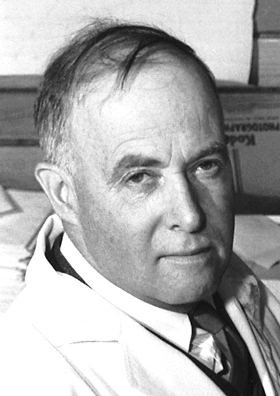
- Sumner in 1946
- Born: November 19, 1887; Canton, Massachusetts, USA
- Died: August 12, 1955 (aged 67); Buffalo, New York, US
- Education: Harvard University
- Known for: First to isolate an enzyme in crystallized form First to show that an enzyme is a protein
- Awards: Nobel Prize in Chemistry (1946)
- Scientific career
- Fields: Biochemistry
- Workplaces: Mount Allison University, Cornell University
- Doctoral advisor: Otto Folin
- Doctoral students: Alexander Dounce

James Batcheller Sumner (November 19, 1887 – August 12, 1955) was an American biochemist. He discovered that enzymes can be crystallized, for which he shared the Nobel Prize in Chemistry in 1946 with John Howard Northrop and Wendell Meredith Stanley. He was also the first to prove that enzymes are proteins.

== Biography ==
Sumner was born on November 19, 1887, in Canton, Massachusetts.

While hunting at age 17, Sumner was accidentally shot by a companion and as a result his left arm had to be amputated just below the elbow. He had been left-handed before the accident, after which he had to learn to do things with his right hand.

Sumner graduated from Harvard University with a bachelor's degree in 1910 where he was acquainted with prominent chemists Roger Adams, Farrington Daniels, Frank C. Whitmore, James Bryant Conant and Charles Loring Jackson. After a short period of working in the cotton knitting factory owned by his uncle, he accepted a teaching position at Mount Allison University in Sackville, New Brunswick, Canada. For the year 1911-12 he worked as a teaching assistantship in chemistry at Worcester Polytechnic Institute.

In 1912, he went to study biochemistry in Harvard Medical School and obtained his Ph.D. degree in 1914 with Otto Folin. He then worked as assistant professor of biochemistry at Cornell Medical School in Ithaca, NY.

Sumner married Cid Ricketts (born Bertha Louise Ricketts in Brookhaven, Mississippi) when she attended medical school at Cornell. They married on July 10, 1915, and had four children. They were divorced in 1930, but she kept her married name. Cid Ricketts Sumner went on to become an author, writing books that included Tammy Tell Me True, which was made into the movie Tammy and the Bachelor, and Quality, which became the movie Pinky. Cid Ricketts Sumner was murdered by their grandson, John R. Cutler, in 1970.

In 1931 Sumner married Agnes Lundkvist. In 1943 they divorced; later that year he married Mary Beyer, with whom he had two children.

== Research ==
It was in 1917 at Cornell where Sumner began his research into isolating enzymes in pure form; a feat which had never been achieved before. The enzyme he worked with was urease, which he isolated from jack beans. Sumner's work was unsuccessful for many years and many of his colleagues were doubtful, believing that what he was trying to achieve was impossible, but in 1926 he demonstrated that urease could be isolated and crystallized. He accomplished this by mixing purified urease with acetone and then chilling it; the chilled solution produced crystallized urease. He was also able to show by chemical tests that his pure urease was a protein. This was the first experimental proof that an enzyme is a protein, a controversial question at the time.

His successful research brought him to full professorship at Cornell in 1929. From 1924 on his laboratory was located on the second floor of the new dairy science building, Stocking Hall (today home to Food Science), at Cornell where he did his Nobel Prize–winning research. In 1937 he succeeded in isolating and crystallizing a second enzyme, catalase. By this time, John Howard Northrop of the Rockefeller Institute had obtained other crystalline enzymes by similar methods, starting with pepsin in 1929. It had become clear that Sumner had devised a general crystallization method for enzymes, and also that all enzymes are proteins.

== Honors and awards ==
In 1937, he was given a Guggenheim Fellowship and he spent five months in Sweden working with Professor Theodor Svedberg. Also that year, he was awarded the Scheele Award in Stockholm.

Both Sumner and Northrop, along with Wendell M Stanley, shared the Nobel Prize in 1946 for crystallization of enzymes. In 1947 Sumner became the director of Cornell's enzyme chemistry laboratory. Sumner was elected to the National Academy of Sciences in 1948. In 1949, he was elected a Fellow of the American Academy of Arts and Sciences.

== Death ==
Sumner died at age 67 of cancer in Buffalo, New York on August 12, 1955.
