= Chloroprene =

Chloroprene
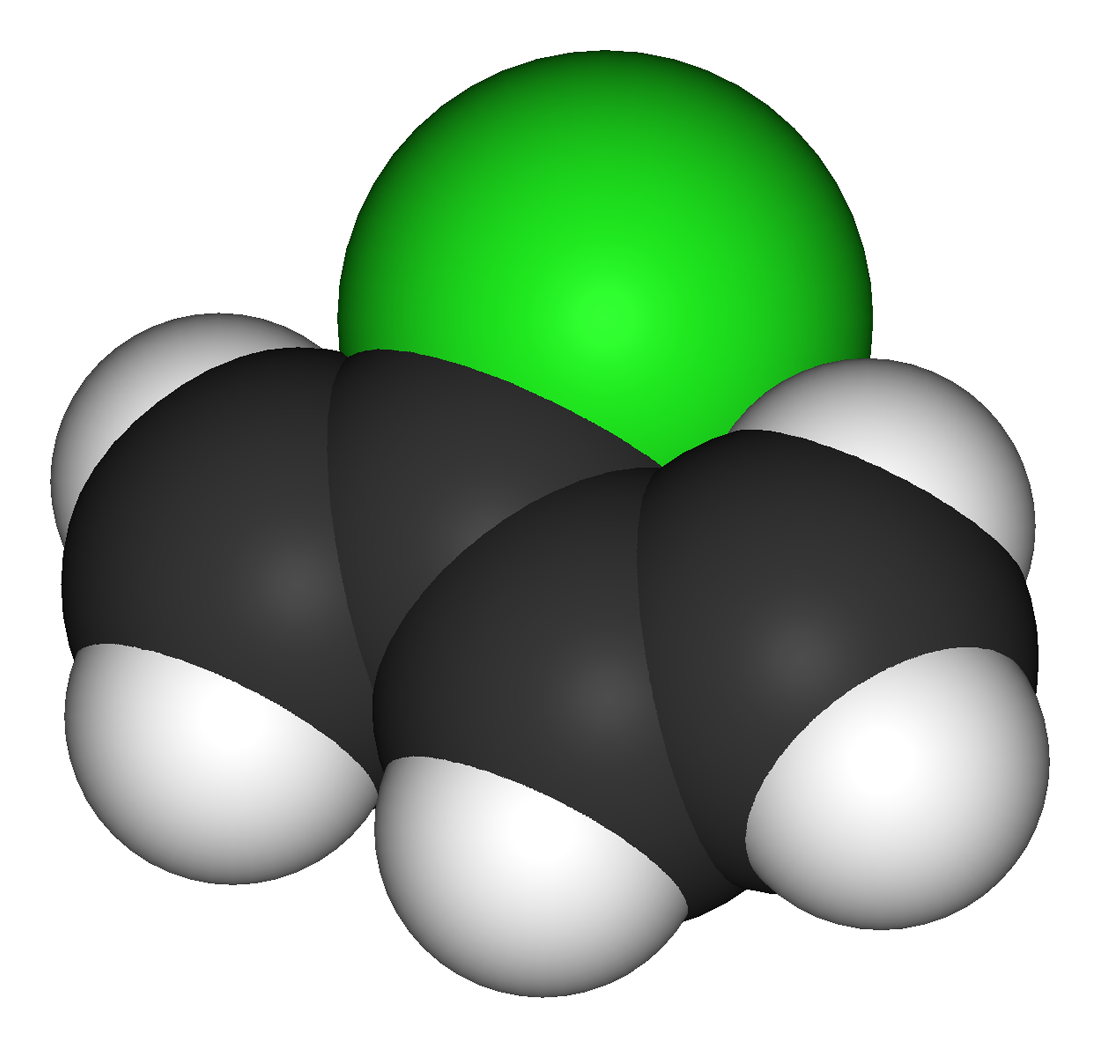
Chloroprene

Names
- Preferred IUPAC name 2-Chlorobuta-1,3-diene
- Other names: Chloroprene; 2-chloro-1,3-butadiene; Chlorobutadiene; β-Chloroprene

Identifiers
CAS Number	126-99-8
3D model (JSmol)	Interactive image
Beilstein Reference	741875
ChEBI	CHEBI:39481
ChEMBL	ChEMBL555660
ChemSpider	29102
ECHA InfoCard	100.004.381
EC Number	204-818-0
Gmelin Reference	277888
KEGG	C19208
PubChem CID	31369
RTECS number	EL9625000
UNII	42L93DWV3A
UN number	1991
CompTox Dashboard (EPA)	DTXSID5020316
- InChI: InChI=1S/C4H5Cl/c1-3-4(2)5/h3H,1-2H2 Key: YACLQRRMGMJLJV-UHFFFAOYSA-N; InChI=1/C4H5Cl/c1-3-4(2)5/h3H,1-2H2 Key: YACLQRRMGMJLJV-UHFFFAOYAQ
- SMILES: C=C(Cl)C=C

Properties
Chemical formula	C_{4}H_{5}Cl
Molar mass	88.53 g·mol^{−1}
Appearance	Colorless liquid
Odor	Pungent, ether-like
Density	0.9598 g/cm^{3}
Melting point	−130 °C (−202 °F; 143 K)
Boiling point	59.4 °C (138.9 °F; 332.5 K)
Solubility in water	0.026 g/100 mL
Solubility in diethyl ether	miscible
Solubility in acetone	miscible
Solubility in benzene	miscible
Solubility in ethanol	soluble
Vapor pressure	118 mmHg (10 °C (50 °F; 283 K)); 188 mmHg (20 °C (68 °F; 293 K)); 215 mmHg (25 °C (77 °F; 298 K))
Refractive index (n_{D})	1.4583

Hazards
- Occupational safety and health (OHS/OSH)
Main hazards	Highly flammable, irritant, toxic
- GHS labelling
Pictograms	(GHS02: Flammable) (GHS07: Exclamation mark) (GHS08: Health hazard)
Signal word	Danger
Hazard statements	H225, H302, H315, H319, H332, H335, H350, H373
Precautionary statements	P203, P210, P233, P240, P241, P242, P243, P260, P264, P264+P265, P270, P271, P280, P281, P301+P317, P302+P352, P303+P361+P353, P304+P340, P305+P351+P338, P308+P313, P317, P318, P319, P321, P330, P332+P317, P337+P313, P362+P364, P370+P378, P403+P233, P403+P235, P405, P501
NFPA 704 (fire diamond)	2 3 1
Flash point	−4 °C (25 °F; 269 K)
Explosive limits	1.9%–20.0%
Threshold limit value (TLV)	10 ppm (skin) (TWA)
- Lethal dose or concentration (LD, LC)
LD_{50} (median dose)	450 mg/kg (rat, oral)
LC_{50} (median concentration)	3207 ppm (rat, 4 hr)
LC_{Lo} (lowest published)	1052 ppm (rabbit, 8 hr); 350 ppm (cat, 8 hr)
- NIOSH (US health exposure limits)
PEL (Permissible)	25 ppm (90 mg/m^{3}, TWA, skin)
REL (Recommended)	1 ppm (3.6 mg/m^{3}, Ca C, [15-minute])
IDLH (Immediate danger)	300 ppm (1086 mg/m^{3})

Related compounds
Related Dienes	Butadiene; Isoprene
Related compounds	2,3-Dichlorobutadiene; Vinyl chloride
- Except where otherwise noted, data are given for materials in their standard state (at 25 °C [77 °F], 100 kPa). verify (what is ?) Infobox references

Chloroprene (IUPAC name 2-chlorobuta-1,3-diene) is a chemical compound with the molecular formula CH_{2}=CCl−CH=CH_{2}. Chloroprene is a colorless volatile liquid, almost exclusively used as a monomer for the production of the polymer polychloroprene, better known as neoprene, a type of synthetic rubber.

== History ==
Although it may have been discovered earlier, chloroprene was largely developed by DuPont during the early 1930s, specifically with the formation of neoprene in mind. The chemists Elmer K. Bolton, Wallace Carothers, Arnold Collins and Ira Williams are generally accredited with its development and commercialisation although the work was based upon that of Julius Arthur Nieuwland, with whom they collaborated.

Only one facility in the United States produces the chemical, the Pontchartrain Works in Reserve, Louisiana. In 2015, the United States Environmental Protection Agency identified chloroprene as causing cancer.

== Production ==
Chloroprene is produced in three steps from 1,3-butadiene: (i) chlorination, (ii) isomerization of part of the product stream, and (iii) dehydrochlorination of 3,4-dichlorobut-1-ene.

Chlorine adds to 1,3-butadiene to afford a mixture of 3,4-dichlorobut-1-ene and 1,4-dichlorobut-2-ene. The 1,4-dichloro isomer is subsequently isomerized to 3,4 isomer, which in turn is treated with base to induce dehydrochlorination to 2-chlorobuta-1,3-diene. This dehydrohalogenation entails loss of a hydrogen atom in the 3 position and the chlorine atom in the 4 position thereby forming a double bond between carbons 3 and 4:

CH_{2}=CHCH=CH_{2} + Cl_{2} → ClCH_{2}CH=CHCH_{2}Cl
ClCH_{2}CH=CHCH_{2}Cl → ClCH_{2}CHClCH=CH_{2}
ClCH_{2}CHClCH=CH_{2} → CH_{2}=CClCH=CH_{2} + HCl

The chief impurity in chloroprene prepared in this way is 1-chlorobuta-1,3-diene, which is usually separated by distillation. In 1983, approximately 2 million kilograms (2,200 short tons) were produced in this manner.

=== Acetylene process ===
Until the 1960s, chloroprene production was dominated by the "acetylene process," which was modeled after the original synthesis of vinylacetylene. In this process, acetylene is dimerized to give vinyl acetylene, which is then combined with hydrogen chloride to afford 4-chloro-1,2-butadiene (an allene derivative), which in the presence of copper(I) chloride, rearranges to the targeted 2-chlorobuta-1,3-diene:

The acetylene process is energy-intensive and has high investment costs. Furthermore, the intermediate vinyl acetylene is unstable. This "acetylene process" has been replaced by the chlorination of 1,3-butadiene.

== Hazards ==
Chloroprene may explosively polymerize. The peroxide catalyzes this.

=== Occupational exposure limits ===
A table of occupational exposure limits (OELs) from various jurisdictions follows. In general, the OELs range from 0.55 to 25 ppm.

Occupational exposure limits for chloroprene
Organization	Concentration
NIOSH REL	1 ppm
ACGIH TLV 8-hour TWA	10 ppm
OSHA PEL 8-hour TWA	25 ppm
Mine Safety and Health Administration	25 ppm
Austria OEL MAK-TMW	5 ppm
Belgium OEL TWA	10 ppm
Denmark OEL ceiling concentration	1 ppm
Finland OEL TWA	1 ppm
France OEL VME	10 ppm
Hungary OEL TWA	5 ppm
Iceland OEL Short Term Exposure Limit (STEL)	1 ppm
Korea OEL TWA	10 ppm
Mexico OEL TWA	10 ppm
New Zealand OEL TWA	10 ppm
Norway OEL TWA	1 ppm
Peru OEL TWA	10 ppm
Poland OEL MAC TWA	0.55 ppm
Sweden OEL TWA	1 ppm
Switzerland OEL MAK-week	5 ppm
The Netherlands OEL MAC-TGG	5 ppm

=== Environment ===
The fate of chloroprene in the environment has been examined. Due to its volatility and extreme reactivity, it is not expected to bioaccumulate.

=== Health ===
Chloroprene is toxic. Chloroprene is potentially carcinogenic, can cause temporary hair loss on the exposed area, and can cause damage to the eyes and skin.

The Environmental Protection Agency designated chloroprene as likely to be carcinogenic to humans based on evidence from studies that showed a statistically significant association between occupational chloroprene exposure and the risk of lung cancer. There are criticisms of this report that indicate that the unsafe exposure levels may have been exaggerated badly based on levels for known carcinogens.

Chronic exposure to chloroprene may have the following symptoms: liver function abnormalities, disorders of the cardiovascular system, and depression of the immune system.

One fatality as a result of chloroprene intoxication has been recorded, which was a result of cleaning a container used for chloroprene.
