= Charles Loring Jackson =

American organic chemist

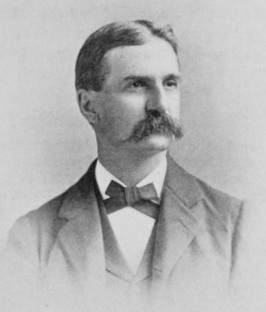
- c. 1899
- Born: April 4, 1847; Boston, Massachusetts, US
- Died: October 31, 1935 (aged 88); Prides Crossing, Massachusetts, US
- Occupation: Organic chemist

Academic background
- Education: Harvard College
- Doctoral advisor: Josiah Parsons Cooke

Charles Loring Jackson (April 4, 1847 – October 31, 1935) was the first significant organic chemist in the United States. He brought organic chemistry to the United States from Germany and educated a generation of American organic chemists.

== Early life ==
Charles Loring Jackson was born in Boston on April 4, 1847. His paternal grandfather was Charles Greely Loring, a Boston-based lawyer. He graduated from Harvard College in 1867 after studying in private schools in Boston.

== Career ==
Due to his interest in the student body, Jackson was a proctor in the dormitories of the Harvard Yard—Gray 5 from 1868 to 1871 and Holsworthy II from 1871 to 1918. Jackson joined the Harvard chemistry department as an assistant lecturer immediately after graduation. He was the third member of the department, which consisted of Josiah Parsons Cooke and Henry Barker Hill.In 1870, Jackson developed a chemistry course that evolved into Chemistry I, which he taught for more than 40 years. Chemistry I was the first descriptive inorganic chemistry course of its kind at Harvard to offer individual laboratory practice for students.

He became an assistant professor in 1871. While studying chemistry at Harvard in 1873, Jackson experienced a mild episode of rheumatic fever. He took a year's leave of absence and studied in Europe. He traveled to Heidelberg, Germany where he studied at Ruprecht Karl University of Heidelberg under Robert Bunsen, a specialist in gas analysis and platinum metals. Although he did not intend to make organic chemistry his specialty, he also worked with the organic chemist August Wilhelm von Hofmann, who inspired Jackson to pursue organic chemistry as a career. Jackson reportedly said that he learned to "use his mind" under Hofmann, "an activity that Bunsen rather discouraged."

During Jackson's time in Heidelberg, Hofmann was writing his Faraday Lectures on Justus von Liebig and had Jackson correct his English. This was a great opportunity for Jackson to develop an intimate association with Hofmann. In 1874, Jackson published his first paper, which dealt with organic selenium compounds.

In 1875, after returning to Harvard, Jackson synthesized the first new organic compound made in a Harvard laboratory, p-bromobenzyl bromide. This provided a method of producing substituted benzyl compounds with interesting results, such as a synthesis of anthracene. In the following years, he developed syntheses of flavoring compounds curcumin and vanillin. He also synthesised benzine tri-sulfonic acid and developed what is now a traditional method of nitrating organic materials, preliminary sulfonation followed by nitration. In the late 1880s he discovered the reaction between highly substituted aromatic halides and malonic ester in which a halogen radical is replaced by a hydrogen, his most prolific source of scientific publications. He also did considerable work on the derivatives of o-quinone, although he missed the discovery of the parent compound by only a small margin.

From 1894 to 1903, he was Chairman of the Division of Chemistry at Harvard. In 1897, Jackson received the coveted Erving professorship. The importance of Jackson's studies in Europe to the development of the organic chemistry industry in the United States should not be underestimated. In the 1870s, when Jackson traveled to Europe, there literally was no organic synthesis being done in the United States, either in academia or in industry. This shortcoming became very evident with the advent of World War I and World War II when the supply of strategic organic materials from Germany to the United States was cut off. Had the United States been unable to quickly develop an organic synthesis capability, the outcome of the World Wars might have been quite different.

Several of Jackson's students at Harvard, Roger Adams, Farrington Daniels, Frank C. Whitmore, James B. Sumner, and James Bryant Conant, to name a few, were instrumental in developing organic synthesis in the United States. Some of them had traveled to Germany to study organic synthesis using the connections Jackson had established. In Jackson's time, academic research was generally quite open, resulting in an open and internationalist philosophy among scientists. The World Wars put this philosophy at odds with commonly held beliefs about national security, intellectual property, trade secrets and technology leakage.

Jackson belonged to the American and the German chemical societies and the American and the British Associations for the Advancement of Science, being a corresponding member of the latter. He was elected to the American Academy of Arts and Sciences and to the Natural Academy of Sciences in 1883.

== Personal life ==
As an adult, Jackson enjoyed amateur theatricals and writing poetry and romantic fiction. In retirement, he enjoyed gardening at his family's estate in Prides Crossing near Beverly, Massachusetts. He died there on October 31, 1935.

== Selected publications ==
=== Fiction ===
- Charles Loring Jackson, The Gold Point and Other Strange Stories, Stratford Company of Boston (1926)

=== Scientific ===
- Charles Loring Jackson, Biographical memoir of Henry Barker Hill, 1849-1903, National Academy of Sciences (January 1, 1905) ASIN B0008AF3CW
- Charles Loring Jackson, On certain colored substances derived from nitro compounds, ASIN B0008CBY1E
- Charles Loring Jackson, Charles Robert Sanger: [Biographical notice], Proceedings of the American Academy of Arts and Sciences, ASIN B0008CWAYE
- Charles Loring Jackson, On certain nitro derivatives of the vicinal tribrombenzol, Harvard University—Chemical Laboratory Contributions, ASIN B0008CBYHS
- Charles Loring Jackson, Memoir of Josiah Parsons Cooke, 1827-1894, National Academy of Sciences (January 1, 1902) ASIN B0008AF390
- Charles Loring Jackson, On certain derivatives of orthobenzoquinone, American Academy of Arts and Sciences (January 1, 1900) ASIN B0008CBYIC
- Charles Loring Jackson, On the action of sodic ethylate on tribromdinitrobenzol, American Academy of Arts and Sciences (January 1, 1898) ASIN B0008CBYH8
- Charles Loring Jackson, On certain derivatives of symmetrical trichlorbenzol, American Academy of Arts and Sciences (January 1, 1898) ASIN B0008CBYHI
- Charles Loring Jackson, On the oxide of dichlormethoxyquinone-dibenzoylmethylacetal, American Academy of Arts and Sciences (January 1, 1898) ASIN B0008CBYI2
- Charles Loring Jackson, Samuel Cabot, John Wilson and Son, University Press (January 1, 1908) ASIN B0008D0U36
