= Harry Ives Thompson =

American artist

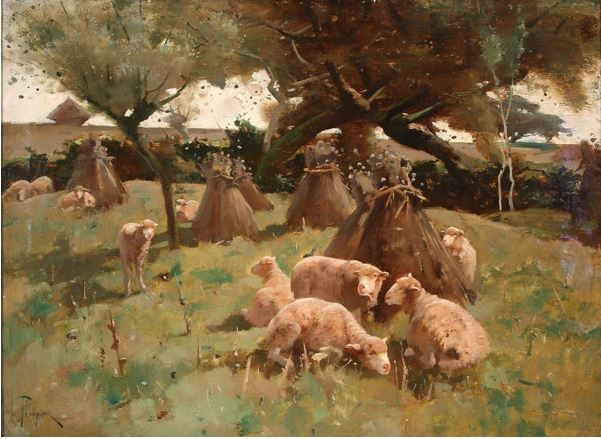
Pastoral Scene with Sheep

Harry Ives Thompson (31 January 1840, West Haven, Connecticut - 1906, West Haven, Connecticut) was an American painter, known primarily for his portraits and rural scenes.

== Biography ==
He was initially trained as a merchant and helped operate the family grocery store; painting in his leisure time. Upon turning twenty-one, in 1861, he decided that he would rather pursue a career in art and took lessons from Benjamin Hutchins Coe (1799-1883), a landscape painter from Hartford.

Three years later, Coe retired and Thompson took over his drawing school in New Haven until 1867. His first public showing came at the Philadelphia Centennial Exhibition. From 1877 to 1890, he was a regular exhibitor at the National Academy of Design in New York. He also produced numerous portraits of notable people associated with Yale University.

He occasionally painted in New Hampshire as well.
