= Wallace Carothers =

American chemist and inventor (1896–1937)

Wallace Hume Carothers
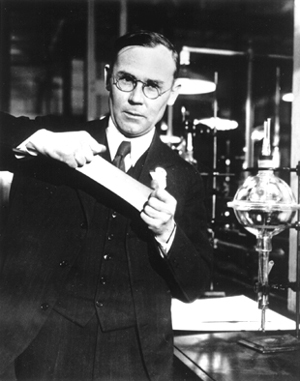
- Born: April 27, 1896; Burlington, Iowa, U.S.
- Died: April 29, 1937 (aged 41); Philadelphia, Pennsylvania, U.S.
- Education: Tarkio College (BS); University of Illinois (MA and PhD)
- Known for: Invention of neoprene and nylon, Carothers equation
- Scientific career
- Fields: Organic chemistry
- Doctoral advisor: Roger Adams

Wallace Hume Carothers (/kəˈrʌðərz/; April 27, 1896 – April 29, 1937) was an American chemist, inventor, and the leader of organic chemistry at DuPont, who was credited with the invention of nylon.

Carothers was a group leader at the DuPont Experimental Station laboratory, near Wilmington, Delaware, where most polymer research was done. Carothers was an organic chemist who, in addition to first developing nylon, also helped lay the groundwork for neoprene. After receiving his PhD, he taught at several universities before he was hired by DuPont to work on fundamental research.

He married Helen Sweetman on February 21, 1936. Carothers had been troubled by periods of depression since his youth. Despite his success with nylon, he felt that he had not accomplished much and had run out of ideas. His unhappiness was exacerbated by the death of his sister, and on April 28, 1937, he committed suicide by drinking potassium cyanide, sixteen months before the public announcement of nylon's discovery on October 27, 1938. His daughter, Jane, was born on November 27, 1937.

== Education and academic career ==
Carothers was born on April 27, 1896, in Burlington, Iowa, to Ira and Mary Evalina Carothers. He was the oldest of four children. He had one brother and two sisters: John, Isobel and Elizabeth. As a youth, Carothers was fascinated by tools and mechanical devices and spent many hours experimenting. He attended public school in Des Moines, Iowa, where he was known as a conscientious student. After graduation, and under pressure from his father, Carothers enrolled in the Capital City Commercial College in Des Moines, where his father was vice-president, completing the accountancy and secretarial curriculum in July 1915.

In September 1915, he entered Tarkio College in Missouri. Although he initially majored in English, he switched to chemistry under the influence of Arthur Pardee, head of that department. Carothers so excelled in chemistry that before graduation he was made a chemistry instructor and studied for as well as taught the senior course when Pardee left to become chairman of the chemistry department at the University of South Dakota. He graduated from Tarkio in 1920 at the age of 24 with a bachelor of science degree. Then he went to the University of Illinois for his master of arts degree, which he received in 1921 under the guidance of Professor Carl Marvel.

During the 1921–1922 school year, Carothers held a one-year appointment as a chemistry instructor at the University of South Dakota. It was at the University of South Dakota that he began his independent research that resulted in an article accepted by the Journal of the American Chemical Society. In this paper he measured physical properties of phenyl isocyanate and of diazobenzene-imide (now known as phenyl azide). The properties have very similar values, which led him to the conclusion that the structure of the second compound is C_{6}H_{5}-N=N=N, with the three nitrogen atoms in a linear chain rather than a ring as previously thought.

He went back to the University of Illinois to study for his PhD under Roger Adams. His degree was awarded in 1924. He specialized in organic chemistry and minored in physical chemistry and mathematics. He worked as a research assistant during 1922–1923 and received the Carr Fellowship for 1923–1924. This was the most prestigious award offered by the university at that time.

He was initiated into Alpha Chi Sigma in 1926 as a member of Zeta Chapter at the University of Illinois.

After receiving his PhD, Carothers stayed at the University of Illinois for two years as an instructor in organic chemistry.

In 1926, Carothers moved to Harvard University, where he was again an instructor in organic chemistry. Harvard president James B. Conant – himself a chemist – wrote of Carothers:

In his research, Dr. Carothers showed even at this time the high degree of originality which marked his later work. He was never content to follow the beaten path or to accept the usual interpretations of organic reactions. His first thinking about polymerization and the structure of substances of high molecular weight began while he was at Harvard.

In 1927, DuPont decided to fund fundamental, pure research: research not deliberately aimed at the development of a money-making product. Carothers traveled to Wilmington, Delaware, to discuss the possibility of being in charge of organic chemistry at the new DuPont laboratory for fundamental research.

== Move to DuPont ==
The decision to leave academia was difficult for Carothers. At first he refused DuPont's offer of employment, explaining that "I suffer from neurotic spells of diminished capacity which might constitute a much more serious handicap there than here." In spite of this admission, a DuPont executive, Hamilton Bradshaw, traveled to Harvard and convinced Carothers to change his mind. His salary was $500 a month as compared with only $267 at Harvard ($3200 per year).

Later in a letter to Wilko Machetanz, his Tarkio roommate, Carothers expanded on his feelings of depression: "I find myself, even now, accepting incalculable benefits proffered out of sheer magnanimity and good will and failing to make even such trivial return as circumstances permit and human feeling and decency demand, out of obtuseness or fear or selfishness or mere indifference and complete lack of feeling."

=== Neoprene ===
At Dupont Carothers was given a position in its new fundamental research program just recently established in Wilmington, Delaware and the company allowed him to choose any research area. He chose polymer research because the subject needed theoretic exploration and had immense commercial implications. Carothers began working at the DuPont Experimental Station on February 6, 1928. The synthesis of a polymer with a molecular weight of more than 4,200, the mass achieved by Dr. Emil Fischer, was his primary goal.

By the summer of 1928, Carothers had a small staff of PhD chemists and two consultants: Dr. Roger Adams, his thesis advisor, and Dr. Carl Marvel, his instructor of organic chemistry at the University of Illinois. The laboratory where these top scientists worked became known as "Purity Hall". It was discouraging that by the middle of 1929, "Purity Hall" had not produced a polymer with a weight of much over 4,000.

In January 1930, Dr. Elmer K. Bolton became assistant chemical director in the chemical department, and thus, Carothers' immediate boss. Bolton wanted practical results in 1930, and his wish was fulfilled. Bolton asked Carothers to examine the chemistry of an acetylene polymer with the goal of creating synthetic rubber. In April 1930, one of Carothers' staff, Dr. Arnold M. Collins, isolated chloroprene, a liquid which polymerized to produce a solid material that resembled rubber. This product was the first synthetic rubber, named Neoprene.

=== Polyesters ===
The same year, Dr. Julian W. Hill, another member of the Carothers team, again began work on attempting to produce a polyester with a molecular weight of above 4,000. His efforts were soon met with success when he produced a synthetic polymer with a molecular weight of about 12,000. The high molecular weight allowed the melted polymer to be stretched out into strings of fiber. Thus was created the first synthetic silk, described by the chemists as a superpolyester.

Polyesters and polyamides are examples of condensation polymers formed by step-growth polymerization. Carothers worked out the theory of step-growth polymerization and derived the Carothers equation which relates the average degree of polymerization to the fractional conversion (or yield) of monomer into polymer. This equation showed that for a high molecular weight, a very high fractional conversion is needed (for step-growth polymers only).

Hill also produced a synthetic fiber that was elastic and strong by combining glycols and diacids and heating under reduced pressure, using a molecular still to remove the last traces of water produced by the condensation reaction. Unfortunately, this fiber could not be commercialized because it reverted to a sticky mass when placed in hot water. Carothers subsequently dropped his research on polymers for several years.

== Later career and depression ==
In 1931, Carothers moved into a house in Wilmington, which became known as Whiskey Acres, with three other DuPont scientists. He was no recluse, but his depressive moods often prevented him from enjoying all the activities in which his roommates took part. In a letter to a close friend, Frances Spencer, he said, "There doesn't seem to be much to report concerning my experiences outside of chemistry. I'm living out in the country now with three other bachelors, and they being socially inclined have all gone out in tall hats and white ties, while I after my ancient custom sit sullenly at home." At about this time, Carothers showed Julian Hill that he kept a capsule of cyanide attached to his watch chain.

Carothers hated the public speaking that was necessary to maintain his high-profile. In a letter to Frances Spencer in January 1932, he related, "I did go up to New Haven during the holidays and made a speech at the organic symposium. It was pretty well received but the prospect of having to make it ruined the preceding weeks and it was necessary to resort to considerable amounts of alcohol to quiet my nerves for the occasion. … My nervousness, moroseness and vacillation get worse as time goes on, and the frequent resort to drinking doesn't bring about any permanent improvement. 1932 looks pretty black to me just now."

In 1932, the agreement under which Carothers was hired was modified by Dr. Bolton. "Purity Hall" would now focus on "effecting a closer relationship between the ultimate objectives of our work and the interests of the company". This meant that funds were shifted from pure research to practical research. Carothers did not see himself as a skilled commercial researcher. He proposed that fundamental work be limited to two or three proposals, which would be consistent with DuPont's interests.

Carothers' personal life during this time was busy. He was having an affair with a married woman, Sylvia Moore, who with her husband filed for divorce in 1933. Concomitantly he worried about the financial problems of his parents and planned to bring them to Wilmington. With no thought of the possible emotional ramifications of this move, he bought a house in Arden about ten miles (16 km) from the Experimental Station and moved into it with his parents. He was 37 at the time. Interactions with his parents soon became tense. Carothers was still seeing Sylvia Moore, who was now single, and his parents greatly disapproved of the relationship. Finding the tension in the household too wearing, his parents returned to Des Moines in the spring of 1934.

=== Polyamides ===
In 1934, Carothers turned his attention to fibers again. Now the team substituted diamines for glycols to produce a type of polymer called a polyamide. These substances were much more stable than the polyesters formed by using the glycols. The ability of polyamides to form crystalline domains through hydrogen bonding gives them increased mechanical properties. Therefore, they might produce a synthetic silk that would be practical for everyday use. His research resulted in the invention of a number of new polyamides. The lab work for this project was conducted by Dr. W. R. Peterson and Dr. Donald Coffman. In 1935, Dr. Gerard Berchet was assigned to this polyamide research.

It was during this productive period of research, in the summer of 1934, before the eventual invention of nylon, that Carothers disappeared. He did not come into work, and no one knew where he was. He was found in a small psychiatric clinic, Pinel Clinic, near the famous Phipps Clinic associated with Johns Hopkins Hospital in Baltimore. Apparently, he had become so depressed that he drove to Baltimore to consult a psychiatrist, who put him in the clinic.

=== Nylon ===
Shortly after his release from the clinic, Carothers returned to DuPont. Bolton instructed Carothers to work on polyamides.

Carother's work in linear super-polymers began as an unrestricted foray into the unknown, with no practical objective in mind. But the research was in a new field in chemistry and Du Pont believed that any new chemical breakthrough would likely be of value to the company. In the course of research, Carothers obtained some super-polymers that became viscous solids at high temperatures, and the observation was made that filaments could be made from this material if a rod was dipped in the molten polymer and withdrawn. At this discovery, the focus of the project shifted to these filaments and 'Nylon' was the result.

On February 28, 1935, Gerard Berchet, under the direction of Carothers, produced a half-ounce of polymer from hexamethylenediamine and adipic acid, creating polyamide 6-6, the substance that would come to be known as Nylon. It was difficult to work with because of its high melting point, but Bolton chose this polyamide as the one to develop commercially. He selected Dr. George Graves to work with Carothers on the project. Eventually, Graves supplanted Carothers as the leader of the polyamide project. In addition, dozens of chemists and engineers worked on refining polyamide 6-6 into a viable commercial product.

== Marriage and death ==
On February 21, 1936, Carothers married Helen Sweetman, whom he had been dating since 1934. Sweetman had a bachelor's degree with a major in chemistry and worked for DuPont on the preparation of patent applications. During his lifetime, his friends would often judge his marriage with Helen in comparison to his previous affair with Sylvia Moore, stating that they thought Moore was a greater woman.

Soon afterwards, on April 30, 1936, Carothers became the first industrial organic chemist to be elected to the National Academy of Sciences, a very high honor. Yet, by June 1936, in spite of this honor which validated his contributions to science, Carothers could not shake the depression that prevented him from working. In early June, he was involuntarily admitted to the Philadelphia Institute of the Pennsylvania Hospital, a prestigious mental hospital, under the care of psychiatrist Dr. Kenneth Appel. One month later, he was given permission to leave the institute to go hiking in the Tyrolean Alps with friends. The plan was for him to day hike with Dr. Roger Adams and Dr. John Flack for two weeks. After they left, he continued hiking by himself, without sending word to anyone, not even his wife. On September 14, he suddenly appeared at her desk at the Experimental Station. From that point on, Carothers was not expected to perform any real work at the Experimental Station. He would often go in and visit. He began living in Whiskey Acres again, after his wife had agreed with Dr. Appel that she was not strong enough to watch over Carothers.

On January 8, 1937, Carothers' sister Isobel died of pneumonia. Wallace and Helen Carothers traveled to Chicago to attend her funeral and then to Des Moines for her burial. He still traveled to Philadelphia to visit his psychiatrist, Dr. Appel, who told a friend of Carothers that he thought suicide was the likely outcome of Carothers' case.

On April 28, 1937, Carothers went to the Experimental Station to work. About 5pm the next day, he was found dead in his hotel room with a squeezed lemon and some cyanide salt nearby. No note was found.

He was posthumously inducted into the Alpha Chi Sigma Hall of Fame in 1982.

== Patents ==
- US patent 1995291, "Alkylene Carbonate and Process of Making It", issued 26 March 1935, assigned to Du Pont
- US patent 2012267, "Alkylene Ester of Polybasic Acids", issued 27 August 1935, assigned to Du Pont
- US patent 2071250, "Linear Condensation Polymers", issued 16 February 1937, assigned to Du Pont
