= Julian W. Hill =

American chemist

Julian Werner Hill
- Born: 1904; St. Louis, Missouri, U.S.
- Died: January 29, 1996 (aged 91–92); Hockessin, Delaware, U.S.
- Education: Washington University in St. Louis; Massachusetts Institute of Technology
- Occupation: chemist
- Spouse: Mary Louisa Butcher
- Children: 2 sons, 1 daughter

Julian W. Hill (1904-1996) was an American chemist who helped develop nylon.

== Early life ==
Julian W. Hill was born in 1904, and he grew up in Warrenton, Missouri. He graduated from the School of Engineering & Applied Science at Washington University in St. Louis in 1924, where he earned a bachelor's degree in chemical engineering, and he went on to earn a PhD in organic chemistry from the Massachusetts Institute of Technology in 1928.

== Career ==
Hill joined DuPont, where he worked as a chemist in the Experimental Station laboratories under Wallace H. Carothers's supervision. He initially studied polymers in the 1920s. By 1930, he had used a cold drawing method to produce a polyester. Hill's cold drawing method was used by Carothers in 1934 to develop the polyamide later named nylon, which was patented by DuPont and was a greater commercial success due to its higher melting point.

Hill was promoted to assistant director of the chemical department. He also served on DuPont's steering committee from 1932 to 1951. He became the Chair of DuPont's Committee on Educational Aid in 1951, and he helped fund academic programs in the United States until his retirement in 1964.

== Personal life and death ==
Hill married Mary Louisa "Polly" Butcher, a Vassar College alumna, in 1931. They had two sons and a daughter. He had poliomyelitis. He retired at the Cokesbury Village retirement village in Hockessin, Delaware with his wife, where he died on January 29, 1996.
