= Chemical Industry Medal =

- Date: 1933
- Country: United States
- Presented by: SCI America
- Website: https://sci-america.org/awards/

The Chemical Industry Medal is an annual American award given to an industrial chemist by the Society of Chemical Industry America (SCI America). The medal has been awarded since 1933, when it replaced the Grasselli Medal. It was initially given to "a person making a valuable application of chemical research to industry. Primary consideration shall be given to applications in the public interest." As of 1945, the criterion became "a person who ... has rendered conspicuous service to applied chemistry." More recently it has been awarded "for contributions toward the growth of the chemical industry."

== Recipients ==
- Source: SCI Chemical Industry Medal Past Winners
- 1933 James G. Vail, Philadelphia Quartz Company
- 1934 Floyd G. Metzger, Air Reduction
- 1935 Edward R. Weidlein, Mellon Institute
- 1936 Walter S. Landis, American Cyanamid
- 1937 Evan J. Crane, Chemical Abstracts
- 1938 John V. N. Dorr, Dorr
- 1939 Robert E. Wilson, Standard Oil of Indiana, PanAmerican Petroleum
- 1941 Elmer K. Bolton, Dupont
- 1942 Harrison Howe, ACS
- 1943 John Grebe, Dow
- 1944 Bradley Dewey, Dewey & Almy
- 1945 Sidney Dale Kirkpatrick, Chemical & Metallurgical
- 1946 Willard H. Dow, Dow Chemical
- 1947 George W. Merck, Merck
- 1948 James A. Rafferty, Union Carbide
- 1949 William B. Bell, American Cyanamid
- 1950 William M. Rand, Monsanto
- 1951 Ernest W. Reid, Corn Products
- 1952 J. R. Donald, Crawford H. Greenewalt, Dupont
- 1953 Charles S. Munson, Air Reduction
- 1954 Ernest H. Volwiler, Abbot
- 1955 Joseph George Davidson, Union Carbide
- 1956 Robert Lindley Murray, Hooker Electrochemical
- 1957 Clifford Rassweiler, Johns Manville
- 1958 Fred J. Emmerich, Allied
- 1959 Harry B. Mcclure, Union Carbide
- 1960 Hans Stauffer, Stauffer
- 1961 William Edward Hanford, Olin Mathieson
- 1962 Kenneth H. Klipstein, American Cyanamid
- 1963 Max Tishler, Merck
- 1964 Leland I. Doan, Dow
- 1965 Ralph Connor, Rohm and Haas
- 1966 Monroe E. Spaght, Shell
- 1967 Chester M. Brown, Allied
- 1968 Harold W. Fisher, Standard Oil of New Jersey
- 1969 Charles B. McCoy, Dupont
- 1970 William H. Lycan, Johnson & Johnson
- 1971 Carroll A. Hochwalt, Thomas & Hochwalt, Monsanto
- 1972 Jesse Werner, Gaf
- 1973 Ralph Landau, Scientific Design
- 1974 Carl Gerstacker, Dow
- 1975 Leonard P. Pool, Air Products & Chemicals
- 1976 Harold E. Thayer, Mallinckrodt
- 1977 F. Perry Wilson, Union Carbide
- 1978 Jack B. St. Clair, Shell
- 1979 Irving S. Shapiro, Dupont
- 1980 Edward Donley, Air Products
- 1981 Thomas W. Mastin, Lubrizol
- 1982 H. Barclay Morley, Stauffer
- 1983 Paul Oreffice, Dow
- 1984 James Affleck, American Cyanamid
- 1985 Louis Fernandez, Monsanto
- 1986 Edward G. Jefferson, Dupont
- 1987 Edwin C. Holmer, Exxon
- 1988 Vincent L. Gregory Jr., Rohm and Haas
- 1989 Richard E. Heckert, Dupont
- 1990 George J. Sella Jr., American Cyanamid
- 1991 Dexter F. Baker, Air Products
- 1992 H. Eugene McBrayer, Exxon
- 1993 W. H. Clark, Nalco
- 1994 Keith R. McKennon, Dow Corning
- 1995 Robert D. Kennedy, Union Carbide
- 1996 John W. Johnstone Jr., Olin
- 1997 J. Roger Hirl, Occidental Chemical
- 1998 Edgar S. Woolard, Jr., Dupont
- 1999 J. Lawrence Wilson, Rohm and Haas
- 2000 Vincent A. Calarco, Crompton
- 2001 William S. Stavropoulos, Dow Chemical
- 2002 Earnest W. Deavenport Jr., Eastman Chemical
- 2003 Whitson Sadler, Solvay
- 2004 Thomas E. Reilly, Reilly Industries
- 2005 Daniel S. Sanders, ExxonMobil & Company
- 2006 Jon Huntsman, Sr., Huntsman Corporation
- 2007 Raj Gupta, Rohm and Haas
- 2008 Dennis H. Reilley, Praxair
- 2009 Jeffrey M. Lipton, Nova Chemicals
- 2010 Michael E. Campbell, Arch Chemicals, Inc
- 2011 J. Brian Ferguson, Eastman Chemical
- 2012 David N. Weidman, Celanese
- 2013 Andrew Liveris, Dow Chemical
- 2014 Sunil Kumar, International Speciality Products
- 2015 Stephen D. Pryor, President of ExxonMobil Chemical
- 2016 James L. Gallogly, LyondellBasell
- 2017 Andreas C. Kramvis, Honeywell
- 2018, Cal Dooley, American Chemistry Council
- 2019, Neil A. Chapman, Exxon Mobil Corporation
- 2020, Christopher D. Pappas, Trinseo
- 2021, Craig Rogerson, Hexion
- 2022, Mark Vergnano, Chemours
- 2023, Bhavesh (Bob) Patel, W.R. Grace & Co.
- 2024, John J. Paro, Hallstar
- 2025, Albert Chao and James Chao, Westlake Corporation
- 2026, Karen T. McKee, Exxon Mobil Corporation

== See also ==
- List of chemistry awards
