= James F. Byrnes =

American politician (1882–1972)

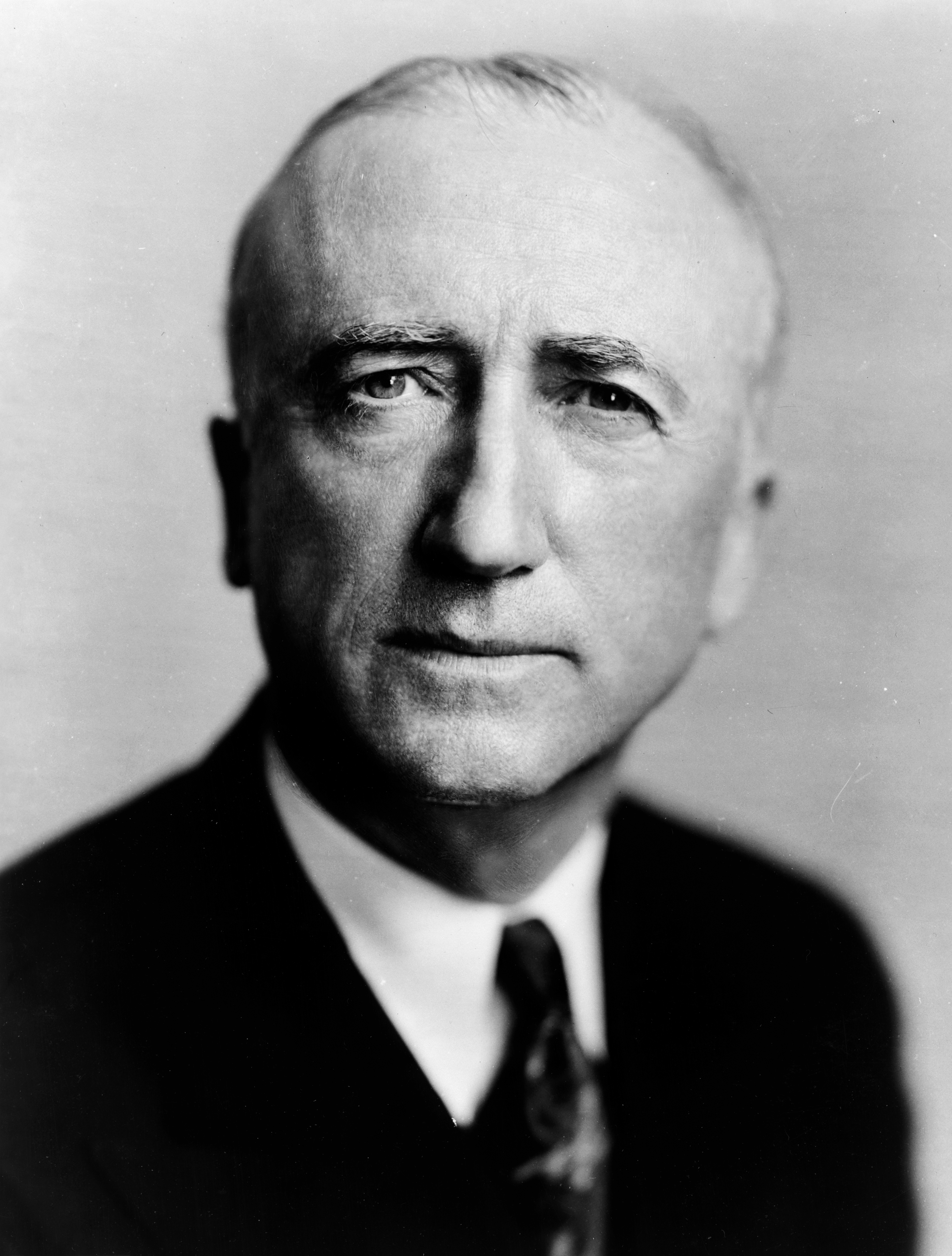
- Byrnes, c. 1941–1942

104th Governor of South Carolina
- In office January 16, 1951 – January 18, 1955
- Lieutenant: George Bell Timmerman Jr.
- Preceded by: Strom Thurmond
- Succeeded by: George Bell Timmerman Jr.

49th United States Secretary of State
- In office July 3, 1945 – January 21, 1947
- President: Harry S. Truman
- Preceded by: Edward Stettinius Jr.
- Succeeded by: George Marshall

Director of the Office of War Mobilization
- In office May 27, 1943 – July 3, 1945
- President: Franklin D. Roosevelt; Harry S. Truman
- Preceded by: Position established
- Succeeded by: John Wesley Snyder

Director of the Office of Economic Stabilization
- In office October 3, 1942 – May 27, 1943
- President: Franklin D. Roosevelt
- Preceded by: Position established
- Succeeded by: Fred M. Vinson

Associate Justice of the Supreme Court of the United States
- In office July 8, 1941 – October 3, 1942
- Nominated by: Franklin D. Roosevelt
- Preceded by: James Clark McReynolds
- Succeeded by: Wiley Rutledge

United States Senator from South Carolina
- In office March 4, 1931 – July 8, 1941
- Preceded by: Coleman Livingston Blease
- Succeeded by: Alva M. Lumpkin

Member of the U.S. House of Representatives from South Carolina's 2nd district
- In office March 4, 1911 – March 3, 1925
- Preceded by: James Patterson
- Succeeded by: Butler Hare

Personal details
- Born: James Francis Byrnes; May 2, 1882 Charleston, South Carolina, U.S.
- Died: April 9, 1972 (aged 89) Columbia, South Carolina, U.S.
- Party: Democratic
- Spouse: Maude Busch (m. 1906)

James Francis Byrnes (US: /ˈbɜːrnz/ BURNZ; May 2, 1882 – April 9, 1972) was an American jurist and politician from South Carolina. A member of the Democratic Party, he served in the U.S. Congress and on the U.S. Supreme Court, as well as in the executive branch, most prominently as the 49th U.S. Secretary of State under President Harry S. Truman. Byrnes was also the 104th governor of South Carolina.

Born and raised in Charleston, South Carolina, Byrnes pursued a legal career with the help of his cousin, Governor Miles Benjamin McSweeney. Byrnes won election to the U.S. House of Representatives and served from 1911 to 1925. He became a close ally of President Woodrow Wilson and a protégé of Senator Benjamin Tillman. He sought election to the U.S. Senate in 1924 but narrowly lost a runoff election to Coleman Livingston Blease, who had the backing of the Ku Klux Klan. Byrnes then moved his law practice to Spartanburg, South Carolina and prepared for a political comeback. He narrowly defeated Blease in the 1930 Democratic primary and was elected to the Senate in 1931.

Historian George E. Mowry called Byrnes "the most influential Southern member of Congress between John Calhoun and Lyndon Johnson". In the Senate, Byrnes supported the policies of his longtime friend, President Franklin D. Roosevelt. Byrnes championed the New Deal and sought federal investment in South Carolina water projects, in addition to supporting Roosevelt's foreign policy, calling for a hard line against the Axis powers. However, he also opposed some of the labor laws proposed by Roosevelt, such as the Fair Labor Standards Act, which established a minimum wage that hurt his state's competitive advantage of very low factory wages. Roosevelt appointed Byrnes to the Supreme Court in 1941 but asked him to join the executive branch after America's entry into World War II after only 1 year and 87 days, making him the shortest-serving Supreme Court justice in history. Byrnes was also the last Supreme Court justice not to earn a law degree. During the war, Byrnes led the Office of Economic Stabilization and the Office of War Mobilization. He was a candidate to replace Henry A. Wallace as Roosevelt's running mate in the 1944 election, but instead Harry S. Truman was nominated by the 1944 Democratic National Convention.

After Roosevelt's death, Byrnes served as a close adviser to Truman and became U.S. Secretary of State in July 1945. In that capacity, Byrnes attended the Potsdam Conference and the Paris Peace Treaties, 1947. However, relations between Byrnes and Truman soured, and Byrnes resigned from the Cabinet in January 1947. He returned to elective politics in 1950 by winning the election as the governor of South Carolina. As governor, he opposed the Supreme Court decision in Brown v. Board of Education and sought to establish "separate but equal" as a realistic alternative to the desegregation of schools.

== Early life and career ==
Byrnes was born at 538 King Street in Charleston, South Carolina, and was reared in Charleston. Byrnes's father, James Francis Byrnes, died shortly after Byrnes was born. His father was Catholic of English, Irish, Welsh, and Scottish ancestry. He was descended from Sir John Stawell, Ralph Hopton, 1st Baron Hopton and William Cavendish, 1st Duke of Newcastle, who all played significant roles in the English civil war as well as the Irish aristocrats Gerald FitzGerald, 8th Earl of Kildare and Margaret Butler, Countess of Ormond. His mother, Elizabeth McSweeney Byrnes, was a dressmaker who was born in 1859. In the 1880s, a widowed aunt and her three children came to live with them; one of the children was Frank J. Hogan, later president of the American Bar Association. At 14, Byrnes left St. Patrick's Catholic School to work in a law office, and became a court stenographer. Notably, he transcribed the 1903 trial of South Carolina Lieutenant Governor James H. Tillman for murdering a newspaper editor. In 1906, he married the former Maude Perkins Busch of Aiken, South Carolina; they had no children. He was the godparent of James Christopher Connor. At this time, Byrnes converted from the Catholic Church to the Episcopal Church.

In 1900, Byrnes's cousin, Governor Miles B. McSweeney, appointed him as a clerk for Judge Robert Aldrich of Aiken. As he needed to be 21 to take this position, Byrnes, his mother, and McSweeney changed his date of birth to that of his older sister, Leonora. He later apprenticed to a lawyer, then a common practice, read for the law, and was admitted to the bar in 1903. In 1908, he was appointed solicitor for the second circuit of South Carolina and served until 1910. Byrnes was a protégé of Senator and former governor "Pitchfork Ben" Tillman and often had a moderating influence on the fiery segregationist Senator.

In 1910, he narrowly won the Democratic primary for U.S. Representative from South Carolina's 2nd congressional district, which was then tantamount to election. He was formally elected in the general election and was re-elected six times, serving from 1911 to 1925.

The platform Byrnes stood on for Congress had several progressive points, such as better conditions for workers in textile mills. Byrnes proved a brilliant legislator, working behind the scenes to form coalitions, and avoiding the high-profile oratory that characterized much of Southern politics. He became a close ally of US President Woodrow Wilson, who often entrusted important political tasks to the capable young Representative, rather than to more experienced lawmakers. In the 1920s, he was a champion of the "Good Roads Movement", which attracted motorists and politicians to large-scale road building programs.

== United States Senate and Supreme Court ==
In 1924, Byrnes declined renomination to the House and instead sought nomination for the Senate seat held by incumbent Nathaniel B. Dial, though both were former allies of the now-deceased "Pitchfork Ben" Tillman. Anti-Tillmanite and extreme racist demagogue Coleman Blease, who had challenged Dial in 1918, also ran again. Blease led the primary with 42 percent. Byrnes was second with 34 percent. Dial finished third with 22 percent.

Byrnes was opposed by the Ku Klux Klan, which preferred Blease. Byrnes had been raised as a Roman Catholic, and the Klan spread rumors that he was still a secret Catholic. Byrnes countered by citing his support by Episcopal clergy. Three days before the run-off vote, 20 Catholics who said that they had been altar boys with Byrnes published a professed endorsement of him. That group's leader was a Blease ally, and the "endorsement" was circulated in anti-Catholic areas. Blease won the runoff 51% to 49%.

After his House term ended in 1925, Byrnes was out of office. He moved his law practice to Spartanburg, in the industrializing Piedmont region. Between his law practice and investment advice from friends such as Bernard Baruch, Byrnes became a wealthy man, but he never excluded himself from a return to politics. He cultivated the Piedmont textile workers, who were key Blease supporters. In 1930, he challenged Blease again. Blease again led the primary, with 46 percent to 38 percent for Byrnes, but this time, Byrnes won the runoff 51 to 49 percent.

During his time in the Senate, Byrnes was regarded as the most influential South Carolinian since John C. Calhoun. He had long been friends with President Franklin D. Roosevelt, whom he supported for the Democratic nomination in 1932, and made himself Roosevelt's spokesman on the Senate floor, where he guided much of the early New Deal legislation to passage.

He won an easy re-election in 1936, promising:

I admit I am a New Dealer, and if [the New Deal] takes money from the few who have controlled the country and gives it back to the average man, I am going to Washington to help the President work for the people of South Carolina and the country.

Byrnes also criticized those who spoke out against the interventionist policies of the Roosevelt administration by making references to Thomas Jefferson and states' rights, arguing that Jefferson was a progressive and liberal as well a "champion of the masses." Adding to his point, Byrnes asserted that

if the sage of Monticello were alive today, he would frown upon any effort to use his views of states' rights to block social and economic reforms so badly needed to improve conditions for those who labor in the factories and toil in the fields.

Since the colonial era, South Carolina's politicians had dreamed of an inland waterway system that would not only aid commerce but also control flooding. By the 1930s, Byrnes took up the cause for a massive dam-building project, Santee Cooper, that would not only accomplish those tasks but also electrify the entire state with hydroelectric power. With South Carolina financially strapped by the Great Depression, Byrnes managed to get the federal government to authorize a loan for the entire project, which was completed and put into operation in February 1942. The loan was later repaid to the federal government with full interest and at no cost to South Carolina taxpayers. Santee Cooper has continued to serve as a model for public-owned electric utilities worldwide.

In 1937, Byrnes supported Roosevelt's highly controversial court-packing plan, but he voted against the 1938 Fair Labor Standards Act, as a minimum wage would potentially make the textile mills in his state uncompetitive. He opposed Roosevelt's efforts to purge conservative Democrats in the 1938 primary elections. On foreign policy, Byrnes was a champion of Roosevelt's positions of helping the United Kingdom against Nazi Germany in 1939 to 1941 and of maintaining a hard diplomatic line against Japan. In this context, he denounced isolationist Charles Lindbergh on several occasions.

Byrnes played a key role in blocking anti-lynching legislation, notably the Costigan–Wagner Bill of 1935 and the Gavagan bill of 1937. Byrnes said that "rape is responsible, directly and indirectly, for most of the lynching in America."

Byrnes despised his fellow South Carolina Senator "Cotton Ed" Smith, who strongly opposed the New Deal. He privately sought to help his friend Burnet R. Maybank, then the Mayor of Charleston, defeat Smith in the 1938 Senate primary. During the primary, however, Olin Johnston, who was limited to one term as governor, decided to run for the Senate. Because Johnston was also a pro-Roosevelt New Dealer, he would have divided the New Deal vote with Maybank and ensured a victory for Smith. Johnston was also supportive of the New Deal's labor legislation, but Byrnes's support was limited, and a series of labor strikes in the fall of 1937 made Byrnes withdraw consideration for potentially endorsing Johnston. Taking advice from Byrnes, Maybank decided to run for governor instead, and Byrnes made the reluctant decision to support Smith. Byrnes envisioned that Smith would retire in 1944 and that Maybank would successfully run for Smith's Senate seat and build a strong political machine in the state with him.

On June 12, 1941, Roosevelt nominated Byrnes as an associate justice of the United States Supreme Court, and he was confirmed that same day. He served on the Court for only 15 months, from July 8, 1941, until October 3, 1942. His Supreme Court tenure is the shortest of any justice. Byrnes was the last Supreme Court Justice not to earn a law degree.

== World War II ==
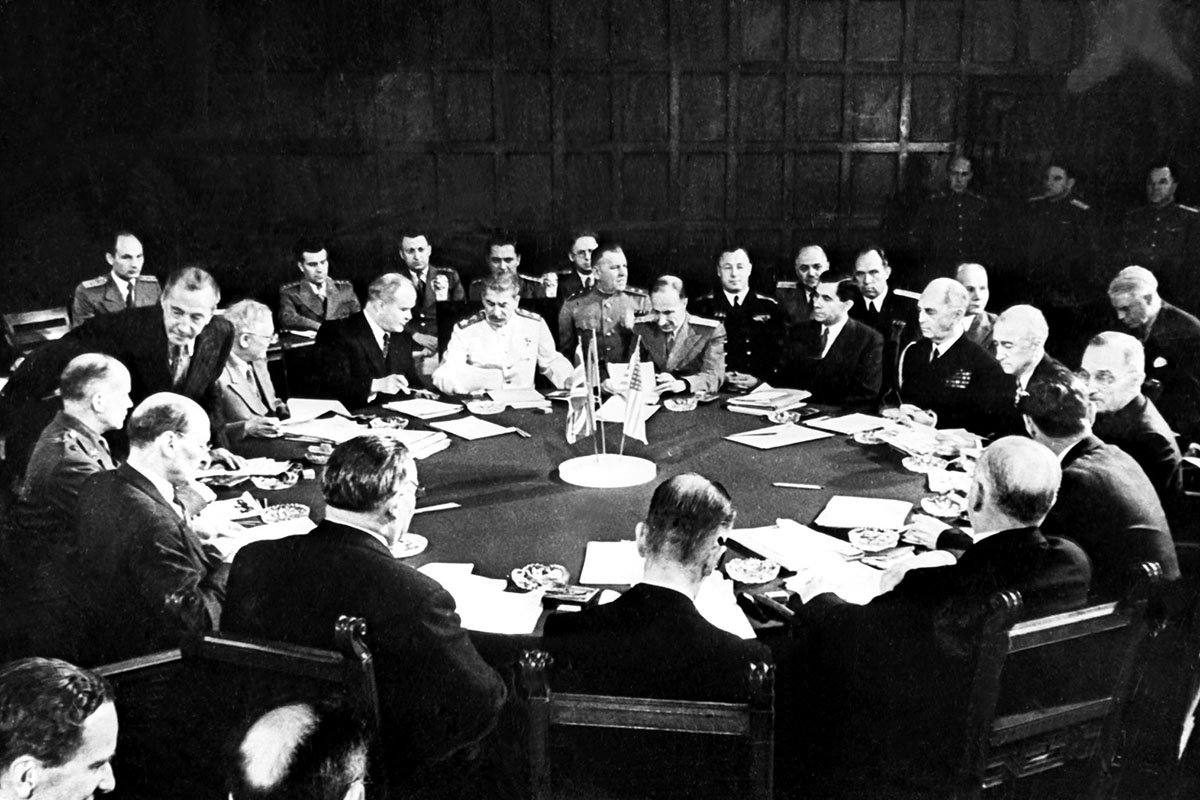
Potsdam Conference: Sitting (from left) Clement Attlee, Ernest Bevin, Vyacheslav Molotov, Joseph Stalin, William Daniel Leahy, James F. Byrnes and Harry S. Truman.

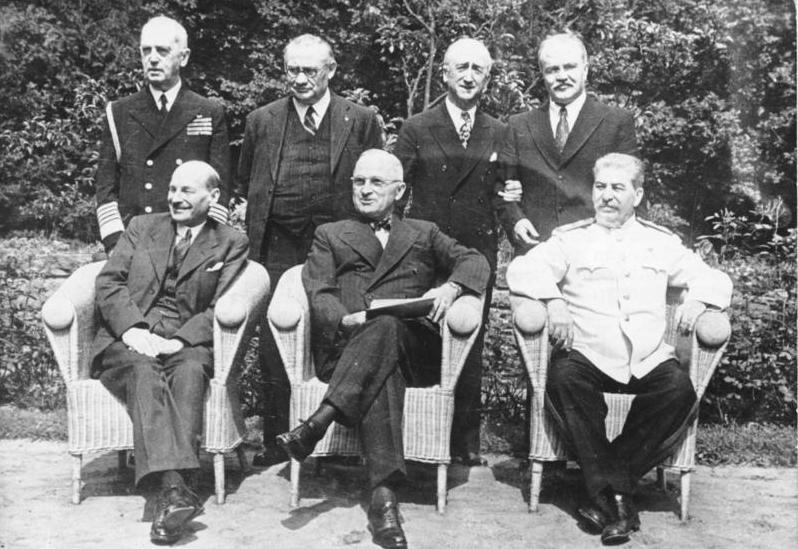
Sitting (from left): Clement Attlee, Harry S. Truman, Joseph Stalin; behind: William Daniel Leahy, Ernest Bevin, James F. Byrnes and Vyacheslav Molotov.

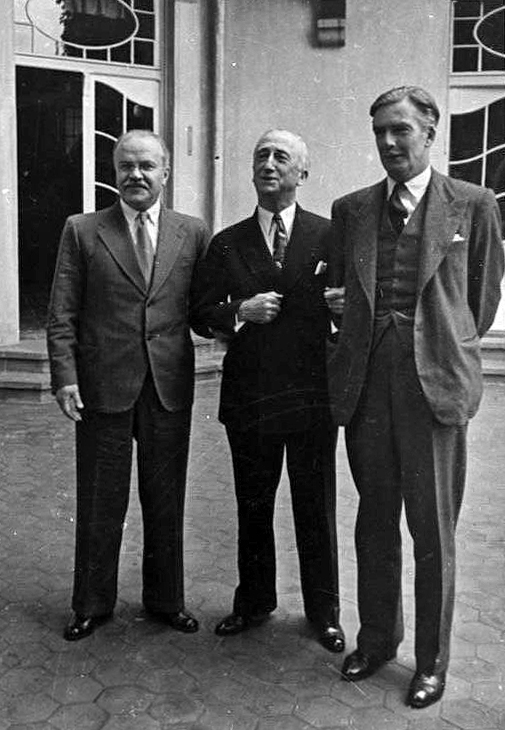
The Foreign Ministers: Vyacheslav Molotov, James F. Byrnes and Anthony Eden, July 1945.

Newsreel: Byrnes returns from Paris peace conference to report to President Truman, October 1946

Byrnes left the Supreme Court to head Roosevelt's Office of Economic Stabilization, which dealt with the vitally important issues of prices and taxes. How powerful the new office would become depended entirely on Byrnes's political skills, and Washington insiders soon reported that he was fully in charge. In May 1943, he became head of the Office of War Mobilization, a new agency that supervised the Office of Economic Stabilization. Under the leadership of Byrnes, the program managed newly constructed factories across the country that used raw materials, civilian and military production, and transportation for United States Armed Forces personnel and was credited with providing the employment that was needed to bring an official end to the Great Depression. Thanks to his political experience, his probing intellect, his close friendship with Roosevelt, and in no small part his personal charm, Byrnes was soon exerting influence over many facets of the war effort that were not technically under his departmental jurisdiction. Many in Congress and the press began referring to Byrnes as the "Assistant President."

Many expected that Byrnes would be the Democratic nominee in 1944 for vice president in Franklin D. Roosevelt's 1944 reelection campaign, replacing Henry A. Wallace, who was strongly felt by party officials to be too eccentric to replace an ailing president who would likely die before his next term ended. Roosevelt refused to endorse anybody other than Wallace. He had a personal preference for US Supreme Court justice William O. Douglas. Byrnes was on Roosevelt's list but was hardly his first choice. In a July meeting at the White House, the party bosses pressed hard for Senator Harry S. Truman of Missouri, and Roosevelt issued a statement saying he would support either Truman or Douglas. Byrnes was regarded as too conservative for organized labor; some big city bosses opposed him as an ex-Catholic who would offend Catholics; and blacks were wary of his opposition to racial integration. In short, Byrnes never had a serious chance at being nominated for vice president, and the nomination went instead to Truman.

Roosevelt brought Byrnes to the Yalta Conference in early 1945 in which he seemed to favor Soviet plans. Written in shorthand, his notes comprise one of the most complete records of the "Big Three" Yalta meetings. At the same time, Byrnes did not participate in the foreign ministers' meetings or the direct meetings between Roosevelt, Winston Churchill, and Joseph Stalin. After the Conference, he was influential in convincing the U.S. Congress and the general public to accept the terms of the agreement.

In 1945, Byrnes was awarded the Distinguished Service Medal by President Truman for his work in the Office of War Mobilization.

=== Byrnes, World War II and the atomic bomb ===
As head of the wartime Office of War Mobilization, Byrnes provided oversight, material, and financial resources for the high-priority Manhattan Project.

Byrnes served on an Interim committee making recommendations on the use of the atomic bomb during and after the war. The committee, headed by War Secretary Henry L. Stimson, included Byrnes, Vannevar Bush, James Conant, Karl T. Compton, Under Secretary of the Navy Ralph Austin Bard, and Assistant Secretary of State William L. Clayton. The scientific panel of the committee consisted of J. Robert Oppenheimer, Arthur Compton, Enrico Fermi and Ernest Lawrence. A business leader's branch of the committee included Walter S. Carpenter Jr. and James A. Rafferty. George C. Marshall was the US Military voice on the committee. Additional feedback was provided by the Committee on the Social and Political Implications of the Atomic Bomb, formed by Metallurgical Laboratory of the University of Chicago, chaired by James Franck with Leo Szilard and Glenn T. Seaborg.

== Secretary of State ==
Upon his succession to the presidency after Roosevelt's death, on April 12, 1945, Truman relied heavily on Byrnes's counsel, Byrnes having been a mentor to Truman from the latter's earliest days in the Senate. When Truman met Roosevelt's coffin in Washington, he asked Byrnes and former Vice President Wallace, the two other men who might well have succeeded Roosevelt, to join him at the train station. Truman originally intended for both men to play leading roles in his administration to signal continuity with Roosevelt's policies. Truman quickly fell out with Wallace but retained a good working relationship with Byrnes and increasingly turned to him for support.

Truman appointed Byrnes as US Secretary of State on July 3, 1945. Despite personally objecting to any guarantees of retaining Hirohito, Byrnes remained ambiguous on that point in a draft reply to Japan's offer of surrender of August 10. As Secretary of State, he was first in line to the presidency (until adoption of the 1947 succession act) since there was no Vice President during Truman's first term. He played a major role at the Potsdam Conference, the Paris Peace Conference, and other major postwar conferences. According to historian Robert Hugh Ferrell, Byrnes knew little more about foreign relations than Truman. He made decisions after consulting a few advisors, such as Donald S. Russell and Benjamin V. Cohen. Byrnes and his small group paid little attention to the State Department experts and similarly ignored Truman.

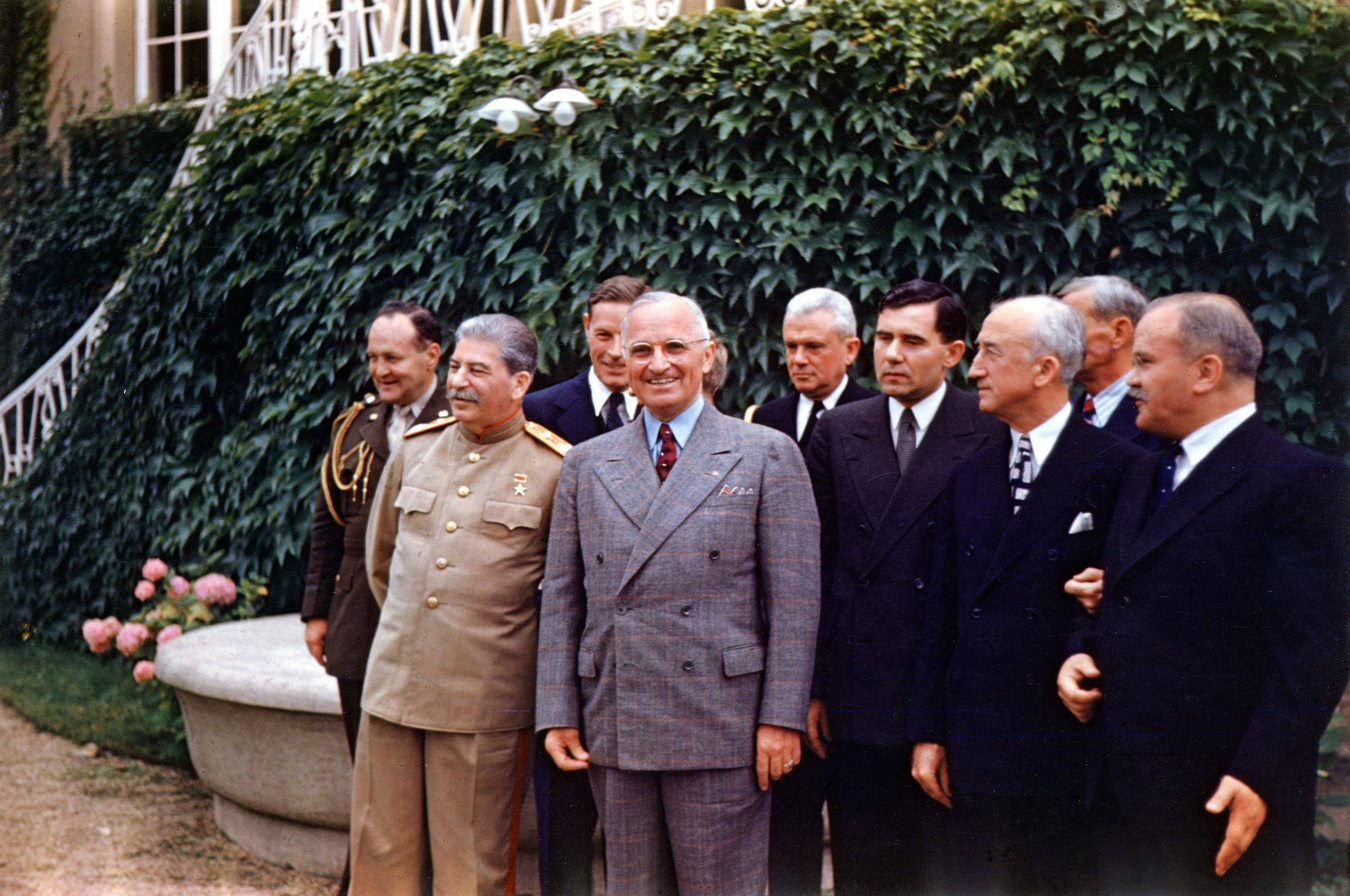
Harry S. Truman and Joseph Stalin meeting at the Potsdam Conference on 18 July 1945. From left to right, first row: Stalin, Truman, Soviet Ambassador Andrei Gromyko, Byrnes, and Soviet Foreign Minister Vyacheslav Molotov. Second row: Truman confidant Harry H. Vaughan, Russian interpreter Charles Bohlen, Truman naval aide James K. Vardaman, Jr., and Charles Griffith Ross (partially obscured).

Because Byrnes had been part of the US delegation at Yalta, Truman assumed that he had accurate knowledge of what had transpired. It would be many months before Truman discovered that not to be the case. Nevertheless, Byrnes advised that the Soviets were breaking the Yalta Agreement and that Truman needed to be resolute and uncompromising with them.

Byrnes and British Foreign Secretary Ernest Bevin issued a joint statement announcing that they were combining the U.S. and British occupation zones of Germany. General Lucius D. Clay, who had been a top aide to Byrnes in 1944, heavily influenced Byrnes' famous September 1946 speech in Stuttgart, Germany. The speech, "Restatement of Policy on Germany," marked the formal transition in American occupation policy away from the Morgenthau Plan of economic dismantlement to one of economic reconstruction.

Truman was rapidly moving toward a hard-line position on Soviet intentions in Eastern Europe and Iran, but Byrnes was much more conciliatory. The distance between them grew, and ties of personal friendship weakened. In late 1945, Byrnes argued with Soviet Foreign Minister Viacheslav Molotov over Soviet pressures on Bulgaria and Romania. Byrnes sent Mark Ethridge, a liberal journalist, to investigate; Ethridge found conditions were indeed bad. Ethridge wrote a damning report, but Byrnes ignored it and instead endorsed a Soviet offer. Truman read Ethridge's report and decided that Byrnes's soft-line approach had failed and that the US needed to stand up to the Kremlin.

Personal relations between the two men grew strained, particularly when Truman felt that Byrnes was attempting to set foreign policy on his own and to inform the President only afterward. An early instance of the friction was the Moscow Conference in December 1945. Truman considered the "successes" of the conference to be "unreal" and was highly critical of Byrnes's failure to protect Iran, which was not mentioned in the final communiqué. "I had been left in the dark about the Moscow conference," Truman told Byrnes bluntly. In a subsequent letter to Byrnes, Truman took a harder line in reference to Iran: "Without these supplies furnished by the United States, Russia would have been ignominiously defeated. Yet now Russia stirs up rebellion and keeps troops on the soil of her friend and ally— Iran. .. Unless Russia is faced with an iron fist and strong language, another war is in the making. Only one language do they understand.... I do not think we should play compromise any longer.... I am tired of babying the Soviets". That led to the Iran crisis of 1946, in which Byrnes took an increasingly hard-line position in opposition to Stalin, culminating in a speech in Germany on September 6, 1946. The "Restatement of Policy on Germany," also known as the "Speech of Hope", set the tone of future US policy by repudiating the Morgenthau Plan, an economic program that would permanently deindustrialize Germany. Byrnes was named TIME Man of the Year. Truman and others believed that Byrnes had grown resentful that he had not been Roosevelt's running mate and successor and so was showing disrespect to Truman. Whether or not that was true, Byrnes felt compelled to resign from the Cabinet in 1947 with some feelings of bitterness.

== Governor of South Carolina ==
Byrnes was not yet ready to give up public service. At 68, he was elected Governor of South Carolina in the 1950 gubernatorial election and served from 1951 to 1955. Supporting segregation in education, the Democratic governor stated in his inaugural address:

Whatever is necessary to continue the separation of the races in the schools of South Carolina is going to be done by the white people of the state. That is my ticket as a private citizen. It will be my ticket as governor.

— James F. Byrnes

Byrnes was initially seen as a relatively moderate on race issues. Recognizing that the South could not continue with its entrenched segregationist policies much longer but fearing that Congress would impose sweeping change upon the South, he opted for a course of change from within. To that end, he sought to fulfill at last the "separate but equal" policy that the South had advanced in Supreme Court civil rights cases, particularly regarding public education. Byrnes poured state money into improving black schools, buying new textbooks and new buses, and hiring additional teachers. He also sought to curb the power of the Ku Klux Klan by passing a law that prohibited adults from wearing a mask in public on any day other than Halloween; he knew that many Klansmen feared exposure and would not appear in public in their robes unless their faces were hidden as well. Byrnes hoped to make South Carolina an example for other Southern states to follow in modifying their "Jim Crow" policies. Nonetheless, the NAACP sued South Carolina to force the state to desegregate its schools. Byrnes requested Kansas, a Midwestern state that also segregated its schools, to provide an amicus curiae brief in support of the right of a state to segregate its schools. That gave the NAACP's lawyer, Thurgood Marshall, the idea to shift the suit from South Carolina over to Kansas, which led directly to Brown v. Board of Education, a decision that Byrnes vigorously criticized.

The South Carolina Constitution then barred governors from immediate re-election, so Byrnes retired from active political life after the 1954 election.

== Later political career ==
In his later years, Byrnes became a conservative, with one historian noting how in 1949 he publicly lashed out at the growth of the welfare state and Harry Truman's Fair Deal. Byrnes foresaw that the American South could play a more important role in national politics. To hasten that development, he sought to end the region's nearly automatic support for the Democratic Party, which Byrnes believed had grown too liberal and took the "Solid South" for granted at election time, while otherwise ignoring the region and its needs.

Byrnes endorsed Dwight Eisenhower in 1952, segregationist candidate Harry Byrd in 1956, Richard Nixon in 1960 and 1968, and Barry Goldwater in 1964. He gave his private blessing to US Senator Strom Thurmond of South Carolina to bolt from the Democratic Party in 1964 and to declare himself a Republican, but Byrnes himself remained a Democrat.

In 1965, Byrnes spoke out against the "punishment" and the "humiliation" of South Carolina US Representative Albert Watson, who had been stripped of his congressional seniority by the House Democratic Caucus after endorsing Goldwater for president in 1964. Watson then resigned from the House and became a Republican. Byrnes endorsed Watson in the 1965 special election to fill the seat, which Watson won.

Byrnes died at the age of 89, and was interred in the churchyard at Trinity Episcopal Church in Columbia, South Carolina.

== Legacy ==
Byrnes is memorialized at several South Carolina universities and schools:

- The James F. Byrnes Building, housing the Byrnes International Center at the University of South Carolina.
- The James F. Byrnes Professorship of International Studies at USC, its first endowed professorship.
- Byrnes Auditorium at Winthrop University.
- Byrnes Hall, a dormitory at Clemson University, where Byrnes was a Life Trustee.
- James F. Byrnes High School in Duncan, South Carolina.

In 1948, Byrnes and his wife established the James F. Byrnes Foundation Scholarships. His papers are in Clemson University's Special Collections Library.

Byrnes' portrait hangs in the South Carolina Senate chambers.

In the 2023 film Oppenheimer, directed by Christopher Nolan, Byrnes was portrayed by actor Pat Skipper.

== See also ==
- List of justices of the Supreme Court of the United States by court composition
- List of United States Supreme Court justices by time in office
- List of law clerks for the third seat of the Supreme Court of the United States
- United States Supreme Court cases during the Stone Court
- Oliver Stone's Untold History of the United States, Episodes 2 and 3

== Sources ==
- Alperovitz, Gar (August 6, 1996). The Decision to Use the Atomic Bomb. Knopf Doubleday Publishing Group. ISBN 978-0-679-76285-0.
- Byrnes, James (1947). Speaking Frankly.
- Byrnes, James (1958). All in One Lifetime.
- Annotated bibliography for James Byrnes from the Alsos Digital Library for Nuclear Issues (Archived August 28, 2006, at the Wayback Machine)
- James Francis Byrnes at the Biographical Directory of Federal Judges, a publication of the Federal Judicial Center.
- Lifton, Robert J.; Mitchell, Greg (1995). Hiroshima in America, Fifty Years of Denial. G. P. Putnam's Sons. p. 136 (footnote, Byrnes "as a kindly 'older brother' to Truman" in the Senate). ISBN 0-399-14072-7.
- Messer, Robert L. (1982). The End of an Alliance: James F. Byrnes, Roosevelt, Truman, and the Origins of the Cold War. Chapel Hill: University of North Carolina Press. p. 13. ISBN 0-8078-7921-5.
- McCullough, David (1992). Truman. New York: Simon & Schuster. p. 352.
- Robertson, David (1994). Sly and Able: A Political Biography of James F. Byrnes Archived June 5, 2011, at the Wayback Machine

U.S. House of Representatives
Preceded by James Patterson	Member of the U.S. House of Representatives from South Carolina's 2nd congressional district 1911–1925	Succeeded by Butler Hare
Party political offices
Preceded by Coleman Blease	Democratic nominee for U.S. Senator from South Carolina (Class 2); 1930, 1936	Succeeded by Burnet Maybank
Preceded by Strom Thurmond	Democratic nominee for Governor of South Carolina; 1950	Succeeded by George Timmerman
U.S. Senate
Preceded by Coleman Blease	U.S. senator (Class 2) from South Carolina; 1931–1941; Served alongside: Ed Smith	Succeeded by Alva Lumpkin
Preceded by John Townsend	Chair of the Senate Contingent Expenses Audit Committee; 1933–1941	Succeeded by Scott Lucas
Legal offices
Preceded by James McReynolds	Associate Justice of the Supreme Court of the United States; 1941–1942	Succeeded by Wiley Rutledge
Political offices
New office	Director of the Office of Economic Stabilization; 1942–1943	Succeeded by Fred Vinson
New office	Director of the Office of War Mobilization; 1943–1945	Succeeded by John Snyder
Preceded by Edward Stettinius	United States Secretary of State; 1945–1947	Succeeded by George Marshall
Preceded by Strom Thurmond	Governor of South Carolina; 1951–1955	Succeeded by George Timmerman
