= Arthur W. Thomas =

Arthur Waldorf Thomas (February 18, 1891 – March 22, 1982) was a professor and chemist who specialized in colloid chemistry. He studied and taught at Columbia University for 50 years. He died in New York, N. Y.

== Education and non-military employment ==
Thomas was born in New Brunswick. The full tenure of Thomas' career was at Columbia University, where he received his bachelor's degree in 1912, his A.M. in 1914, and his Ph.D. in 1915. Thomas was an instructor in food chemistry from 1912 to 1917, an assistant professor from 1919 to 1923, and an associate professor from 1923 to 1928. He became full professor of chemistry in 1928. In 1935 he and Mary Engle Pennington were issued a U.S. patent for a method of treating eggs.

== Military service ==
Arthur W. Thomas, then an instructor in Food Chemistry at Columbia University, volunteered for military service in the spring of 1917 and was mustered in as a First Lieutenant in the newly formed Sanitary Corps in the U.S. National Army in September 1917. He was assigned to the Food and Nutrition Section or Division of the Sanitary Corps under the command of the Surgeon General. Thomas took part in food surveys at army cantonments in the Northeast and also served in the Office of the Surgeon General in Washington. The officers in the Food and Nutrition Section included those who in civilian life were professors in chemistry and biochemistry.

In January 1918 Thomas was promoted to captain. In March 1918 he was sent to England where he participated in food surveys at US Army cantonments in southern England.

From April 1918 to June 1919 Thomas served in France where he was stationed in Base Section No. 1 in the northwest, in the front lines with the 26th (Yankee) and 89th (Middle West) Divisions in the Toul sector, and at the Sanitary Corps laboratory station at Dijon where he worked with other offices in the updating of army food rations. In the summer of 1918 he also gave instruction at the Second Army Corps school. In June 1919 he was involved in inspections of the adequacies of ship bakeries and galleys of three dozen Army and Navy troop transports returning thousands of men to America.

== Works ==
- Thomas, A. W. (1913). A further effort to prepare a colorless biuret reagent. Biochemical Bulletin (New York), 2, 556–8.
- Thomas, A. W. (1914). A review of methods for the isolation and identification of the organic constituents of soils. Biochemical Bulletin (New York), 3, 210–21.
- Thomas, A. W. (1914). The phosphorus content of starch. Biochemical Bulletin (New York), 3, 403–6.
- Thomas, A. W. (1915). The chemical constitution of starch. A review. Biochemical Bulletin (New York), 4, 379–97.
- Sherman, H. C., & Thomas, A. W. (1915). Studies on amylases. VIII. The influence of certain acids and salts upon the activity of malt amylase. Journal of the American Chemical Society, 37, 623–43.
- Wilson, J. A., & Thomas, A. W., et al. (1917). Theories of leather formation. Discussion. Journal of the American Leather Chemists Association, 12, 450–61.
- Thomas, A. W. (1917). A noteworthy effect of bromides upon the action of malt amylase. Journal of the American Chemical Society, 39, 1501–3.
- Thomas, A. W., & Baldwin, M. E. (1918). The acidity of chrome liquors. Journal of the American Leather Chemists Association, 13, 192–203.
- Thomas, A. W., & Baldwin, M. E. (1918). The action of neutral salts upon chrome liquors. Journal of the American Leather Chemists Association, 13, 248–55.
- Thomas, A. W. (1918). The nomenclature used in colloid chemistry. A plea for reform. Science, 47, 10–4.
- Thomas, A. W., & Garard, I. D. (1918). Fallacy of determining electrical charge of colloids by capillarity. Journal of the American Chemical Society, 40, 101–6.
- Sherman, H. C., Thomas, A. W., & Baldwin, M. E. (1919). Influence of hydrogen-ion concentration upon enzymatic activity of three typical amylases. Journal of the American Chemical Society, 41, 231–5.
- Thomas, A. W., & Baldwin, M. E. (1919). Contrasting effects of chlorides and sulfates on the hydrogen-ion concentration of acid solutions. Journal of the American Chemical Society, 41, 1981–90.
- Thomas, A. W., & Foster, S. B. (May 1, 1920). Titration of chrome liquors by the conductance method. Hide and Leather, 97–9.
- Thomas, A. W. (May 1, 1920). Determination of sulfuric acid in leather. Hide and Leather, 101.
- Thomas, A. W. (1920). A review of the literature of emulsions. Journal of Industrial and Engineering Chemistry, 12, 177–81.
- Thomas, A. W. (1920). Tabulation of hydrogen and hydroxyl ion concentrations of some acids and bases. Journal of the American Leather Chemists Association, 15, 133–46.
- Thomas, A. W., Baldwin, M. E., & Kelly, M. W. (1920). Time factor in the adsorption of the constituents of chrome liquor by hide substance. Journal of the American Leather Chemists Association, 15, 147–56.
- Thomas, A. W. (1920). Emulsions: theory and practice. Journal of the American Leather Chemists Association, 15, 186–201.
- Thomas, A. W. (1920). Estimation of the tryptic activity of bating materials. Journal of the American Leather Chemists Association, 15, 221–8.
- Thomas, A. W., & Frieden, A. (1920). The determination of hydrochloric acid and neutral chlorides in leather. Journal of Industrial and Engineering Chemistry, 12, 1186–8.
- Thomas, A. W., & Kelly, M. W. (1920). The time factor in the adsorption of chromic sulfate by hide substance. Journal of the American Leather Chemists Association, 15, 487-95 (1920)
- Thomas, A. W. (1920). Determination of sulfuric acid in leather. Journal of the American Leather Chemists Association, 15, 504-10 (1920)
- Thomas, A. W., & Foster, S. B. (1920). Titration of chrome liquors by the conductance method. Journal of the American Leather Chemists Association, 15, 510–6.
- Thomas, A. W. (1920). Order of diffusion of tanning extracts through gelatin jelly and their relation to the results obtained by Wilson and Kern. Journal of the American Leather Chemists Association, 15, 593–5.
- Thomas, A. W., & Kelly, M. W. (1920). Rapid estimation of chromium in chrome liquor by use of the immersion refractometer. Journal of the American Leather Chemists Association, 15, 665–8.
- Thomas, A. W., & Kelly, M. W. (1921). Effect of concentration of chrome liquor upon the adsorption of its constituents by hide substance. Journal of Industrial and Engineering Chemistry, 13, 65–7.
- Quisumbing, F. A., & Thomas, A. W. (1921). Conditions affecting the quantitative determination of reducing sugars by Fehling solution. Elimination of certain errors involved in current methods. Journal of the American Chemical Society, 43, 1503–26.
- Thomas, A. W., & Foster, S. B. (1921). The acid titration of chrome liquors. Journal of the American Leather Chemists Association, 16, 61–3.
- Thomas, A. W. (1922). Research in leather manufacture. Mechanical Engineering, 44, 116.
- A tiny tannery. (January 1922). Scientific American 126, 43. - Photograph and article of Arthur W. Thomas laboratory tannery, "the worlds smallest complete tannery".
- Thomas, A. W. (February 1922). Increased efficiency of leather manufacture is possible through research in fundamentals. Chemical Age. -- Address before the Research Conference at the 42nd annual meeting of the American Society of Mechanical Engineers, New York, December 8, 1921.
- Thomas, A. W., & Kelly, M. W. (1922). The isoelectric point of collagen. Journal of the American Chemical Society, 44, 195–201.
- Thomas, A. W., & Foster, S. B. (1922). The influence of sodium chloride, sodium sulfate, and sucrose on the combination of chromic ion with hide substance. Journal of Industrial and Engineering Chemistry, 14, 132–3.
- Thomas, A. W., & Foster, S. B. (1922). Colloid content of vegetable tanning extracts. Journal of Industrial and Engineering Chemistry, 14, 191–5.
- Thomas, A. W., & Kelly, M. W. (1922). Time and concentration factors in the combination of tannin with hide substance. I. Gambier. II. Quebracho. Journal of Industrial and Engineering Chemistry, 14, 292–4.
- Thomas, A. W., & Kelly, M. W. (1922). Studies in chrome tanning. Equilibria between tetrachrome collagen and chrome liquors. The formation of octachrome collagen. Journal of Industrial and Engineering Chemistry, 14, 621–3.
- Thomas, A. W. (1922). Vegetable tanning. Journal of Industrial and Engineering Chemistry, 14, 829–31.
- Thomas, A. W. (1923). The adsorption of chrome from chrome liquors by hide substance and negative adsorption. Journal of the American Leather Chemists Association, 18, 423–30.
- Thomas, A. W., & Foster, S. B. (1923). The electrical charge of vegetable tannin particles. Industrial and Engineering Chemistry, 15, 707-8.
- Thomas, A. W., & Frieden, A. (1923). The gelatin-tannin reaction. Industrial and Engineering Chemistry, 15, 839–41.
- Thomas, A. W., & Kelly, M. W. (1923). The concentration factor in the combination of tannin with hide substance. Industrial and Engineering Chemistry, 15, 928.
- Thomas, A. W., & Kelly, M. W. (1923). The influence of hydrogen-ion concentration in the fixation of vegetable tannins by hide substance. Industrial and Engineering Chemistry, 15, 1148–53.
- Thomas, A. W., & Yu, C. (1923). Determination of the mixture of arachidic and lignoceric acids in peanut oil by means of magnesium soaps. Journal of the American Chemical Society, 45, 113–28.
- Thomas, A. W., & Yu, C. (1923). New qualitative tests for rape and tung oils. Journal of the American Chemical Society, 45, 129–30.
- Thomas, A. W., & Seymour-Jones, F. L. (1923). Hydrolysis of collagen by trypsin. Journal of the American Chemical Society, 45, 1515–22.
- Thomas, A. W., & Kelly, M. W. (1923). The influence of neutral salts upon the fixation of tannin by hide substance. Industrial and Engineering Chemistry, 15, 1262–3.
- Thomas, A. W., & Frieden, A. (1923). Ferric salt as the "solution link" in the stability of ferric oxide hydrosol. Journal of the American Chemical Society, 45, 2522–32.
- Thomas, A. W., & Johnson, L. (1923). The mechanism of the mutual precipitation of certain hydrosols. Journal of the American Chemical Society, 45, 2532–41.
- Thomas, A. W., & Kelly, M. W. (1924). Differences in kind or degree of tannin fixation. Industrial and Engineering Chemistry, 16, 31–2.
- Thomas, A. W., & Seymour-Jones, F. L. (1924). Action of trypsin upon diverse leathers. Industrial and Engineering Chemistry, 16, 157–9.
- Thomas, A. W., & Kelly, M. W. (1924). Tannic acid tannage. Industrial and Engineering Chemistry, 16, 800–3.
- Thomas, A. W., & Kelly, M. W. (1924). Quinone tannage. Industrial and Engineering Chemistry, 16, 925–6.
- Sherman, H. C., Thomas, A. W., & Caldwell, M. I. (1924). Isoelectric point of malt amylase. Journal of the American Chemical Society, 46, 1711–6.
- Thomas, A. W., & Kelly, M. W. (1925). Vegetable tanning. Industrial and Engineering Chemistry, 17, 41–3.
- Thomas, A. W., & Norris, E. R. (1925). "Irregular series" in the precipitation of albumin. Journal of the American Chemical Society, 47, 501–13.
- Thomas, A. W. (1925). The modern trend in colloid chemistry. Journal of Chemical Education, 2, 323–40.
- Thomas, A. W., & Kelly, M. W. (1925). Thermolability of collagen. Journal of the American Chemical Society, 47, 833–6.
- Thomas, A. W., & Foster, S. B. (1925). Destructive and preservative effect of neutral salts upon hide substance. Industrial and Engineering Chemistry, 17, 1162–4.
- Thomas, A. W., & Foster, S. B. (1925). Action of ultra-violet light on hide protein. Journal of the American Leather Chemists Association, 20, 490–4.
- Thomas, A. W., & Kelly, M. W. (1926). Ultrafiltration of vegetable tanning solutions. Industrial and Engineering Chemistry, 18, 136–8.
- Thomas, A. W., Kelly, M. W., & Foster, S. B. (19236). Aldehyde tannage. Journal of the American Leather Chemists Association, 21, 57–76.
- Thomas, A. W. (1926). Sulfur tannage. Industrial and Engineering Chemistry, 18, 259–61.
- Thomas, A. W., & Foster, S. B. (1926). Behavior of deaminized collagen. Further evidence in favor of the chemical nature of tanning. Journal of the American Chemical Society, 48, 489–501.
- Thomas, A. W., & Kelly, M. W. (1926). Further studies of quinone tannage. Industrial and Engineering Chemistry, 18, 383–5.
- Thomas, A. W., & Mattikow, M. (1926). Method for the direct identification of rapeseed oil by isolation of erucic acid. Journal of the American Chemical Society, 48, 968–81.
- Thomas, A. W., & Kelly, M. W. (1926). Does chromium combine with the basic or acidic groups of hide protein? Journal of the American Chemical Society, 48, 1312-9 (1926)
- Thomas, A. W., & Kelly, M. W. (1926). Nature of vegetable tannage. Industrial and Engineering Chemistry, 18, 625–6.
- Thomas, A. W. (1926). Chemical nature of vegetable tanning. Journal of the American Leather Chemists Association, 21, 487–516.
- Thomas, A. W., & Le Compte, T. R. (1926). The so-called adsorption of ferric oxide hydrosol by charcoal. Fourth Colloid Symposium 1926, 328-54 (Chem. Catalog Co.).
- Thomas, A. W. (1927). Emulsions. Journal of the American Leather Chemists Association, 22, 171–211.
- Thomas, A. W., & Wilson, J. A. (1927). Tannins and vegetable tanning materials. International Critical Tables, 2, 239.
- Thomas, A. W., & Kelly, M. W. (1927). Destructive and preservative effects of neutral salts upon hide substance. II. Industrial and Engineering Chemistry, 19, 477–80.
- Thomas, A. W., & Murray, H. A., Jr. (1928). Gum arabic. Journal of Physical Chemistry, 32, 676–97.
- Thomas, A. W., & Kelly, M. W. (1928). Fixation of aluminum by hide substance. Industrial and Engineering Chemistry, 20, 628–32.
- Thomas, A. W., & Kelly, M. W. (1928). Fixation of iron by hide substance. Industrial and Engineering Chemistry, 20, 632–4.
- Thomas, A. W., & Mayer, C. W. (1928). Estimation of the acid-combining capacity of a protein by means of the interferometer. Proceedings of the Society for Experimental Biology and Medicine, 25, 667–9.
- Field, A. M, & Thomas, A. W. (1928). The grading of collodion membranes by means of ethylene glycol. Proceedings of the Society for Experimental Biology and Medicine, 25, 679.
- Thomas, A. W., & Kelly, M. W. (1929). Temperature factor in vegetable tanning fixation. Journal of the American Leather Chemists Association, 24, 282.
- Thomas, A. W., & Kelly, M. W. (1929). Hydrolysis of hide powder in saturated sodium chloride solutions at various pH values. Journal of the American Leather Chemists Association, 24, 280–2.
- Thomas, A. W., & Kelly, M. W. (1929). Influence of acids upon the fixation of wattle tannin by hide powder. Industrial and Engineering Chemistry, 21, 697–8.
- Thomas, A. W., & Kelly, M. W. (1929). Syntan tannage. Industrial and Engineering Chemistry, 21, 698–701.
- Thomas, A. W., & Kelly, M. W. (1929). Effect of pretreatment upon hydrolysis of hide powder by saturated calcium hydroxide solutions. Industrial and Engineering Chemistry, 21, 701–2.
- Thomas, A. W., & Hamburger, E. R. (1930). Ferric oxybromide hydrosols. Journal of the American Chemical Society, 52, 456–63.
- Thomas, A. W., & Whitehead, T. H. (1930). Effect of sulfate and chloride ion on solutions of aluminum salts. Journal of the American Leather Chemists Association, 25, 127-33 (1930).
- Thomas, A. W. (1931). Scientific accomplishments of the medalist. [Nichols Medal award to John Arthur Wilson]. Industrial and Engineering Chemistry, 23, 435–6.
- Thomas, A. W., & Whitehead, T. H. (1931). Ion interchanges in aluminum oxychloride hydrosols. Journal of Physical Chemistry, 35, 27–47.
- Thomas, A. W., & Tai, A. P. (1932). The nature of "aluminum oxide" hydrosols. Journal of the American Chemical Society, 54, 841–55.
- Thomas, A. W. (1933). New conception of certain colloidal oxides. Journal of the American Leather Chemists Association, 28, 2-24.
- Thomas, A. W., & Bailey, M. I. (1933). Gelation of frozen egg magma. Industrial and Engineering Chemistry, 25, 669–74.
- Thomas, A. W. (1934). Leather. Annual Survey of American Chemistry [1933], 8, 294–96.
- Thomas, A. W. (1934). Summary of the isoelectric point of proteins. Journal of the American Leather Chemists Association, 29, 3–16, 52.
- Thomas, A. W., & Mattikow, M. (February 13, 1934) Vegetable jelly composition. U.S. 1,946,649.
- Thomas, A. W., & Thomson, J. C. (934). Preparation of pure eleostearic acid from Chinese wood oil. Journal of the American Chemical Society, 56, 898.
- Thomas, A. W., & Wicklen, F. C. v. (1934). The nature of chromium oxychloride hydrosols. Journal of the American Chemical Society, 56, 794–8.
- Thomas, A. W., & Van Hauwaert, M. A. (1934). Precise method for determining ammoniacal nitrogen in eggs. Industrial and Engineering Chemistry. Analytical Edition, 6, 338–42.
- Thomas, A. W. (1934). Colloid Chemistry. New York: McGraw-Hill.
- Thomas, A. W., & Vartanian, R. D. (1935). The action of acids on hydrous alumina. Journal of the American Chemical Society, 57, 4–7.
- Thomas, A. W. (1935). Solutions of basic salts of aluminum. Paper Trade Journal, 100, No. 9, 36–9.
- Pennington, M. E., & Thomas, A. W. (April 2, 1935). Treating egg material after separation from the shells. U.S. 1,996,171.
- Thurman, B. H., Thomas, A. W., & Mattikow, M. (March 20, 1935). Coated fabrics and paper; soaps. Brit. 425,986.
- Thomas, A. W., & Kremer, C. B. (1935). Hydrous thoria hydrosols considered as polynuclear basic thorium complexes. Journal of the American Chemical Society, 57, 1821–4.
- Thomas, A. W., & Owens, H. S. (1935). Basic zirconium chloride hydrosols. Journal of the American Chemical Society, 57, 1825–8.
- Thomas, A. W., & Owens, H. S. (1935). The formation of zirconate hydrosols and their disintegration by certain neutral salts. Journal of the American Chemical Society, 57, 2131–5.
- Thomas, A. W., & Kremer, C. B. (1935). Reactions of organic anions with basic thorium chloride hydrosols. Reversal of charge with salts of the hydroxy acids and with nitric acid. Journal of the American Chemical Society, 57, 2538–41.
- Thurman, B. H., Thomas, A. W., & Mattikow, M. (May 5, 1936). Oilproofing paper. U.S. 2,039,753.
- Thomas, A. W. (1936). Chemical Changes in Matter. New York: Columbia Univ. Press.
- Thomas, A. W., & Miller, H. S. (1936). Basic beryllium and complex beryllate hydrosols: an additional contribution to the concept of polyolated and polyoxolated structures. Journal of the American Chemical Society, 58, 2526–33.
- Thomas, A. W., & Cohen, B. (1937). Catalytic decomposition of hydrogen peroxide by aluminum oxyiodide hyrosols. Journal of the American Chemical Society, 59, 268–72.
- Perkins, B. H., & Thomas, A. W. Olation of basic chromic, aluminum and ferric chloride solutions. Stiasny Festschr 307–31.
- Clay, J. P., & Thomas, A. W. (1938). Catalytic effect of anions upon rate of solution of hydrous alumina by acids. Journal of the American Chemical Society, 60, 2384–90.
- Thomas, A. W., & Cohen, B. (1939). Nature of aluminum oxyiodide hydrosols as revealed by their action on hydrogen peroxide. Journal of the American Chemical Society, 61, 401–33.
- Thomas, A. W., & Stewart, W. G. (1939). Nature of titanium dioxide hydrosols. Kolloid-Zeitschrift, 86, 279–88.
- Thomas, A. W. (1941). Quick review of chemical methods for determining vitamins. Food Industries 13, No. 6, 63–4.
- Greenstein, L. M., & Thomas, A. W. (1942). The viscosity of certain "ferric oxide" hydrosols. Journal of Chemical Physics, 10, 229–40.
- Bailey, M. I., & Thomas, A. W. (1942). Thiamine and riboflavin contents of citrus fruits. Journal of Nutrition, 24, 85–92.
- Thomas, A. W. (1942). John Arthur Wilson - obituary. Journal of the American Leather Chemists Association, 37, 525–30.
- Fitt, T. C., Thomas, A. W., & Taggart, A. F. (1943). The nature of dispersed mineral in flotation pulps. American Institute of Mining and Metallurgical Engineers, Tech. Pub. No. 1575, 7 pp.
- Little, R. W., Thomas, A. W., & Sherman, H. C. (1943). Spectrophotometric studies on the storage of vitamin A in the body. Journal of Biological Chemistry, 148, 441–3.
- Thomas, A. W., et al. (1944). Leo Hendrik Baekeland. Science 100, 23–4.
- Marion, S. P., & Thomas, A. W. (1946). Effect of diverse anions on the pH of maximum precipitation of aluminum hydroxide." Journal of Colloid Science, 1, 221–34.
- Houk, A. E. H., Thomas, A. W., & Sherman, H. C. (1946). Some interrelationships of dietary iron, copper, and cobalt in metabolism. Journal of Nutrition, 31, 609–20.
- Graham, R. P., & Thomas, A. W. (1947). The reactivity of hydrous alumina towards acids. Journal of the American Chemical Society, 69, 816–21.
- Carroll, B., & Thomas, A. W. (1949). Spectral changes of dyes in colloidal solutions of hydrous oxides. Journal of Chemical Physics, 17, 1336.
- Thomas, A. W., Rakowitz, D., & Rosoff, M. (December 31, 1954). Studies of the chemistry, formation and structure of certain aluminum soaps. Final Summary Report to Army Chemical Center, Maryland. Contract No. DA-18-108-CML-3960, Project No. 4-09-04-001. 203 pages.
- Kerr, P. F., Thomas, A. W., & Langer, A. M. (1963). The nature and synthesis of ferrimolybdite. American Mineralogist, 48, 14–32.
