= Nell Dorr =

American photographer (1893–1988)

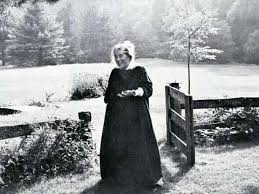
- Nell Dorr at her home Villa Serena, Washington, Connecticut
- Born: Virginia Nell Becker; August 27, 1893; Cleveland, Ohio
- Died: November 15, 1988 (aged 95); Litchfield, Connecticut
- Occupations: Photographer, author
- Notable work: Mother and Child
- Spouse(s): Thomas Koons m.1910, div. 1931. John Van Nostrand Dorr m.1934, dec.1962

Nell (Becker) Dorr (August 27, 1893 – November 15, 1988) was an American photographer.

== Life and work ==
Dorr was born Virginia Nell Becker on August 27, 1893 in Cleveland, Ohio, to Minnie and John Jacob Becker, a photographer. From 1900 the family lived in Massillon, Ohio. Dorr was introduced to photography by her father, John Jacob Becker, a graduate of the Art Institute of Cincinnati, who ran a commercial photography business. It was in Massillon that Dorr made her first successful portrait; of actress Lillian Gish, who spent her summers in the town. The two became lifelong friends.

Dorr married at seventeen to Thomas Koons in 1910 and moved to Florida in 1923 with her family of three girls Virginia (Win), Elizabeth (Betty or Bets), and Barbara (Barby). After her husband's real estate speculation failed in the 1926 economic collapse, Nell opened her own portrait studio to support the family. Gondolier a local society magazine, was one of her clients.

Meanwhile, Dorr also made personal work in a Pictorialist style of still life, nudes and child subjects, on day trips to the Florida Keys. These were to become the material for her first two books Mangroves and In a Blue Moon.

... far away, peaceful places where you can throw off your fears and inhibitions, and bathe in the sea and the sun as you please

— In a Blue Moon, Nell Dorr 1939

=== New York ===
Dorr divorced her husband in 1931 and moved to New York. There she met up with her childhood friend and confidante, movie actress Lillian Gish, and also was introduced to Edward Steichen and Alfred Stieglitz (for whom she baked bread) whose admiration of her individual style gained her useful attention and patronage. She set up her studio in Gish's home at East 59th Street in 1932 to photograph high society. Venturing into photo murals, Dorr exhibited at Marie Sterner International Gallery. She also showed in 1934, Photographic Etudes at Grand Central Art Galleries, then, in both New York (at the Delphic Gallery) and Paris, Portraits of Famous Men, including photographs of poet Carl Sandburg, and John Van Nostrand Dorr, a prominent scientist and inventor, whom she married.

During the Second World War John Dorr and her sons-in-law were on active duty and she took up residence in New Hampshire with daughters and grandchildren, whom she continued to photograph, using the resultant images in her book Mother and Child the exhibition and publication of which was prompted by her grief over the death of her daughter Elizabeth. The Dorr Foundation funded the printing of the book, donating nearly 1,000 copies to the U.S. Information Agency which regarded it as promoting American family values.

Among the exhibitions of her work were MoMA's 1955 world-touring The Family of Man exhibition, also supported by the U.S.I.A., for which four of her images were selected by Edward Steichen. Commenting that Steichen's own work was hardly featured in the show, Dorr suggested that photographic exhibits ought to depict and stand for something more important than just a "Who’s Who in Photography"; "We all are born, we suffer, and we die, and within that compass, we all must walk. Doesn't The Family of Man stress those points? Doesn't it bring the world a little closer?"

From the late forties onward Dorr took up filmmaking, continued exhibiting, and published further books of her work. Her husband John, with whom she lived at Villa Serena, Washington, Connecticut, died in 1962, and in 1964, in his memory, she gave 85 acres of land to the New York-based Horace Mann School for its now 111 ha (275 acre) John Dorr Nature Laboratory campus. One of its student bunkhouses is named for Nell.

Dorr died in Litchfield, Connecticut, November 15, 1988.

== Photography ==
Dorr experimented with a range of photographic techniques including the photogram (as used in In a Blue Moon for the moon images, and some of her murals), macrophotography especially of flowers, mural printing, negative retouching, toning and manipulation, and alternative printing processes. Her fanciful scenes of children posed as fairies and wood nymphs were made amid the scenery of the Florida Keys and Everglades, and the photograms, Dorr's later experimental work, which she referred to as her "abstracts," were created without cameras, and sometimes exposed with only the light of a kitchen match.

== Cinema ==
Dorr's first venture into filmmaking was in 1940–1947 when she made a 16mm film of the modernist Kurt Graff Ballet Company titled The Singing Earth. In 1949 she made another 16–mm sound film, Through the Dorr Way (on her husband's Dorr–Oliver Company) with Erica Anderson, then The Golden Key: Enter the Fantasy World of Tasha Tudor (1957) made in collaboration with the children's book illustrator Tasha Tudor.

== Exhibitions ==
- 1932 solo exhibition of photomurals at Marie Sterner International Gallery, New York;
- 1934 solo exhibition Photographic Etudes at Grand Central Art Galleries, New York;
- 1934 solo exhibition of portraits Famous Men at Delphic Studios, 724 Fifth Ave., New York;
- January 24 – May 8, 1955 group exhibition The Family of Man, Museum of Modern Art, New York, New York;
- December 21, 1960 – February 5, 1961 group exhibition Recent Acquisitions, Museum of Modern Art, New York, New York;
- May 27, 1964 group exhibition, Art in a Changing World:1884–1964: Edward Steichen Photography Center, Museum of Modern Art, New York, New York;
- October 3–17, 1964 solo exhibition, Mother and Child, Washington Art Association, Washington, Connecticut;
- December 1964 – January 1965: Mother and Child, Minneapolis Institute of Arts;
- April 1973 solo exhibition, Battle Creek Civic Art Centre;
- 1973 solo show at Focus Gallery, Union Street, San Francisco, California;
- 1975 group exhibition, Women of Photography: An Historical Survey, San Francisco Museum of Art, San Francisco, California;
- 1976 solo exhibition, Shado Gallery, Portland, Oregon;
- 1979 group exhibition. Recollections: Ten Women of Photography - ICP - International Center of Photography, New York, New York;
- February 1981 solo exhibition of photographs from the 1930s, Massillon Museum, Massillon, Ohio;
- 1984 group exhibition The Feminine gaze, women depicted by women, 1900–1930 - Whitney Museum of American Art - Fairfield County, Stamford, CT;

Posthumous:

- 2008 solo exhibition From Everlasting to Everlasting at Amon Carter Museum of American Art, Fort Worth, Texas;
- 2010 solo exhibition Between Two Worlds: The Photography of Nell Dorr, including work of Dorr's father Jacob Becker. Massillon Museum, Massillon, Ohio.
- 2015, May 3–October 31, Between Two Worlds: The Photography of Nell Dorr Gunn Museum in Washington, Connecticut.

== Collections ==
- Amon Carter Museum of American Art, Fort Worth, Texas, houses the most extensive archive, including albums, cameras and equipment, press clippings, business and personal correspondence (for both Nell Dorr and husband John V.N. Dorr), book dummies, notes, ephemera, family photographs, and videos. Finding Aid
- Carl Sandburg Home National Historic Site, Flat Rock, North Carolina
- International Center of Photography, New York, New York
- Massillon Museum, Massillon, Ohio
- Minneapolis Institute of Arts, Minneapolis, Minnesota

== Books ==
- As Nell Koons (using her first husband's surname), she self-published Mangroves in 1933, and the same set of photographs was published with superior printing by Putnam & Sons as In a Blue Moon (1939).
- Dorr, Nell (1940). A Child Is Born. New York: Nell Dorr, was a self-published poem illustrated with three self-portraits.
- Dorr, Nell (1954) Mother and Child. New York: Harper and Brothers, remains her most popular work.
- Dorr, Nell (1962) The Bare Feet. New York Graphic Society, Greenwich, Conn. is a photo-essay made in Teotitlan del Valle, in Mexico.
- Dorr, Nell (1968). Of Night and Day. New York Graphic Society, Greenwich, Conn. was her response to the Vietnam War. Her mostly semi-abstract images are captioned with extracts from philosophers' texts and aphorisms.
- Dorr, Nell. (1972). Mother and Child, 2nd ed. San Francisco: The Scrimshaw Press.
- Dorr, Nell and Covington Hardee (1975) Life Dance. Allendale, NJ: Alleluia Press.

== Articles ==
- Mayer, Grace M, "Nell Dorr," Infinity 12 (December 1963): 5-14, 24–25, 27.
- Mitchell, Margaretta K, "Nell Dorr," Popular Photography, 76 (March 1975), 98-107, 114–115.
