= Irving Shapiro =

Irving Shapiro may refer to:

- Irving Shapiro, New York labor racketeer with the Shapiro Brothers
- Irving S. Shapiro (1916–2001), lawyer
