= Office of War Mobilization =

Former US government agency

Agency overview
- Formed: May 27, 1943

The Office of War Mobilization (OWM) was an independent agency of the United States government formed during World War II to coordinate all government agencies involved in the war effort. It was formed on May 27, 1943, by Executive Order 9347.

It was headed by James F. Byrnes, a former U.S. Senator and Supreme Court Justice. Byrnes had previously been head of the Office of Economic Stabilization, which controlled prices and taxes. The OWM supervised the OES, and also the War Production Board and other agencies. It was re-titled the Office of War Mobilization and Reconversion on October 3, 1944.

Byrnes' authority as head of the OWM was so far-reaching, he was dubbed the "assistant President".

== See also ==
- Office of War Information
