= Priestley Medal =

- Priestley Medal obverse
- Awarded for: Distinguished service in the field of chemistry
- Date: 1923
- Presented by: American Chemical Society (ACS)

The Priestley Medal is the highest honor conferred by the American Chemical Society (ACS) and is awarded for distinguished service in the field of chemistry. Established in 1922, the award is named after Joseph Priestley, one of the discoverers of oxygen, who immigrated to the United States of America in 1794. The ACS formed in 1876, spearheaded by a group of chemists who had met two years previously in Priestley's home.

The Priestley Medal is among the most distinguished awards in the chemical sciences, behind the Wolf Prize in Chemistry and the Nobel Prize in Chemistry. Consequently, it is commonly awarded to scientists who are advanced in their fields, as it is intended to commemorate lifetime achievement. When the ACS started presenting the Priestley Medal in 1923, they intended to award it every three years. This continued until 1944, when it became an annual award.

== Recipients ==
Priestley Medal reverse (awarded to Linus Pauling in 1984)

1920s

- 1923 Ira Remsen
- 1926 Edgar Fahs Smith
- 1929 Francis P. Garvan

1930s

- 1932 Charles L. Parsons
- 1935 William A. Noyes
- 1938 Marston T. Bogert

1940s

- 1941 Thomas Midgley Jr.
- 1944 James Bryant Conant
- 1945 Ian Heilbron
- 1946 Roger Adams
- 1947 Warren K. Lewis
- 1948 Edward R. Weidlein
- 1949 Arthur B. Lamb

1950s

- 1950 Charles A. Kraus
- 1951 E. J. Crane
- 1952 Samuel C. Lind
- 1953 Sir Robert Robinson
- 1954 W. Albert Noyes Jr. (son of William A. Noyes)
- 1955 Charles A. Thomas
- 1956 Carl S. Marvel
- 1957 Farrington Daniels
- 1958 Ernest H. Volwiler
- 1959 Hermann Irving Schlesinger

1960s

- 1960 Wallace R. Brode
- 1961 Louis Plack Hammett
- 1962 Joel H. Hildebrand
- 1963 Peter Debye
- 1964 John C. Bailar Jr.
- 1965 William J. Sparks
- 1966 William O. Baker
- 1967 Ralph Connor
- 1968 William G. Young
- 1969 Kenneth S. Pitzer

1970s

- 1970 Max Tishler
- 1971 Frederick D. Rossini
- 1972 George B. Kistiakowsky
- 1973 Harold C. Urey
- 1974 Paul J. Flory
- 1975 Henry Eyring
- 1976 George S. Hammond
- 1977 Henry Gilman
- 1978 Melvin Calvin
- 1979 Glenn T. Seaborg

1980s

- 1980 Milton Harris
- 1981 Herbert C. Brown
- 1982 Bryce Crawford
- 1983 Robert S. Mulliken
- 1984 Linus Pauling
- 1985 Henry Taube
- 1986 Karl A. Folkers
- 1987 John D. Roberts
- 1988 Frank H. Westheimer
- 1989 George C. Pimentel

1990s

- 1990 Roald Hoffmann
- 1991 Harry B. Gray
- 1992 Carl Djerassi
- 1993 Robert W. Parry
- 1994 Howard E. Simmons
- 1995 Sir Derek H. R. Barton
- 1996 Ernest L. Eliel
- 1997 Mary L. Good
- 1998 F. Albert Cotton
- 1999 Ronald Breslow

2000s

- 2000 Darleane C. Hoffman
- 2001 Fred Basolo
- 2002 Allen J. Bard
- 2003 Edwin J. Vandenberg
- 2004 Elias J. Corey
- 2005 George A. Olah
- 2006 Paul S. Anderson
- 2007 George M. Whitesides
- 2008 Gabor A. Somorjai
- 2009 M. Frederick Hawthorne

2010s

- 2010 Richard Zare
- 2011 Ahmed H. Zewail
- 2012 Robert S. Langer
- 2013 Peter J. Stang
- 2014 Stephen J. Lippard
- 2015 Jacqueline Barton
- 2016 Mostafa El-Sayed
- 2017 Tobin J. Marks
- 2018 Geraldine L. Richmond
- 2019 Karl Barry Sharpless

2020s

- 2020 JoAnne Stubbe
- 2021 A. Paul Alivisatos
- 2022 Peter B. Dervan
- 2023 Cato T. Laurencin
- 2024 Carolyn Bertozzi
- 2025 Frances Arnold
- 2026 Jennifer Doudna
- 2027 Chad A. Mirkin

== See also ==
- List of chemistry awards
