= Samuel C. Lind =

Father of modern radiation chemistry

- Born: June 15, 1879; McMinnville, Tennessee
- Died: February 12, 1965 (aged 85)
- Education: Washington and Lee University (A.B., 1899); M.I.T. (B.S., 1902); Leipzig University (PhD, 1905)
- Awards: William H. Nichols Medal (1926); Priestley Medal (1952)
- Scientific career
- Fields: Chemistry; Radiation Chemistry; Physical Chemistry
- Workplaces: University of Michigan; U.S. Bureau of Mines; Fixed Nitrogen Research Laboratory; University of Minnesota

Samuel Colville Lind (June 15, 1879 – February 12, 1965) was a radiation chemist, referred to as "the father of modern radiation chemistry".

He gained his B.A in 1899 at Washington and Lee University, Lexington, Virginia. After a short spell at MIT he moved to study chemistry at Leipzig University in Germany, carrying out research into the kinetics of chemical reactions, where he was awarded a Ph.D in 1905. He then returned to work at the University of Michigan until 1913, studying the chemical reactions induced by ionizing radiation. From 1913 to 1925 he worked at the US Bureau of Mines, concerned with extraction of radium from carnotite ore. He subsequently studied the chemical effects of radiation, including on diamonds, and was appointed Chief Chemist of the bureau in 1923. He continued the radiation studies at the Fixed Nitrogen Research Laboratory of the Department of Agriculture (1925–26) and the University of Minnesota (1926–1947) as head of its school of chemistry. In 1935 he was appointed as the first dean of the newly established College of Science and Engineering at Minnesota (known at the time as the Institute of Technology). Lind Hall is named for him on the Minneapolis East Bank campus. He spent his last few working years as acting director of the chemistry division at Oak Ridge National Laboratory studying the radiation chemistry of gases.

He was inducted a Fellow of the American Physical Society in 1927 and elected a member of the United States National Academy of Sciences in 1930. He served as president of the American Electrochemical Society in 1927 and the American Chemical Society in 1940. In 1943, he was elected to the American Philosophical Society in 1943. Among his awards was the Ira Remsen Award in 1947, and the Priestley Medal in 1952.

== Private life ==
He married Marie Holladay of Omaha, Nebraska in 1915.
