= Harrison E. Howe =

American chemist and chemical engineer

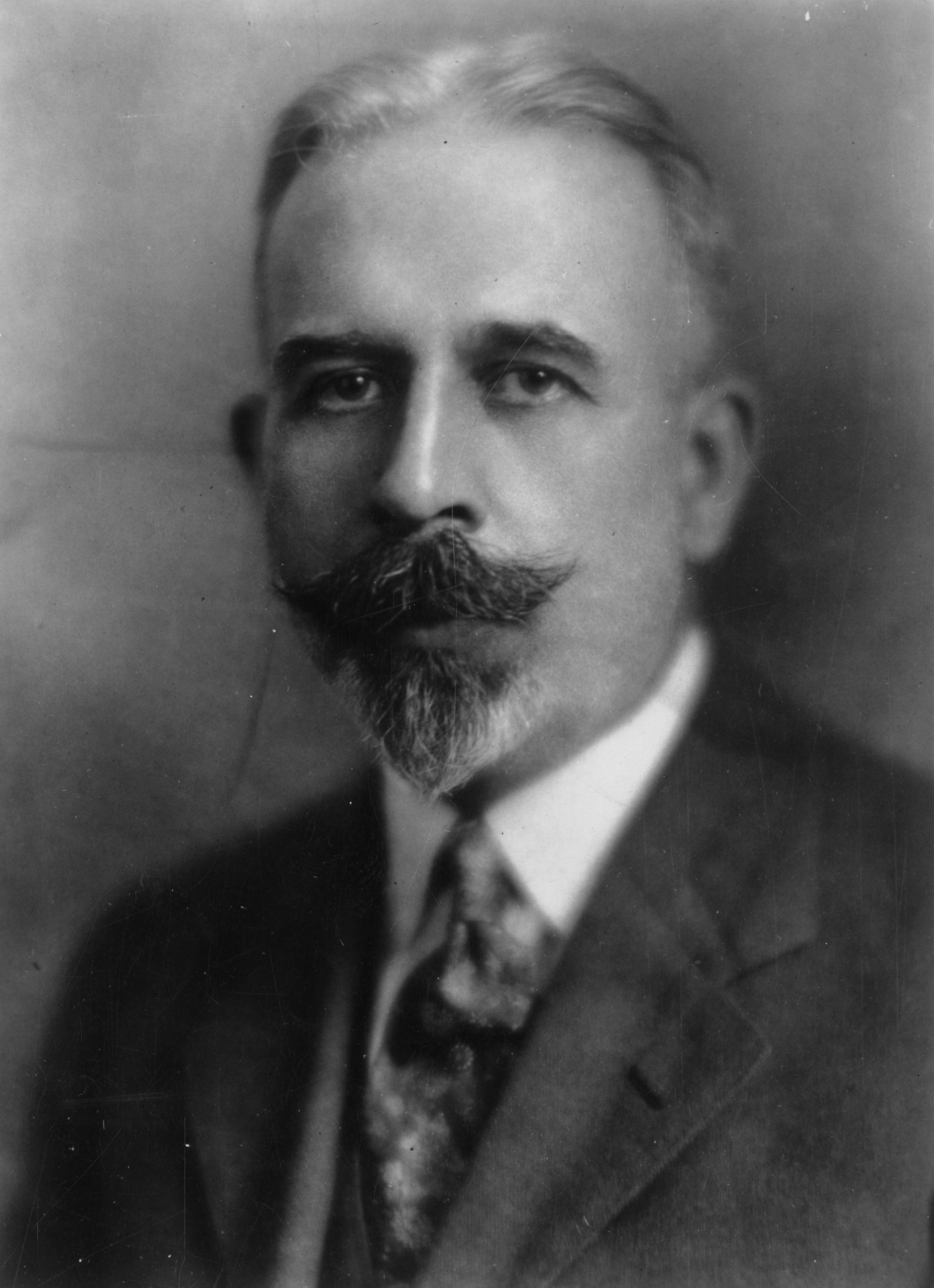
H. E. Howe

Harrison Estell Howe (1881 – December 10, 1942) was an American chemist and chemical engineer. From 1919 to 1921 he was head of the Division of Research Extension of the National Research Council, and was for 21 years the editor of the journal Industrial and Engineering Chemistry. He was a fellow of the American Association for the Advancement of Science and the 1942 recipient of the Chemical Industry Medal. He was the author of several popular science books including The New Stone Age, Chemistry in the World's Work, and Chemistry at Home.

Born in Georgetown, Kentucky in 1881, Howe graduated from Earlham College, Indiana, in 1901. He did post-graduate research at the University of Michigan before earning a M.Sc. at the University of Rochester in 1913. He began his career as chemist with the Sanilac Sugar Refining Company of Croswell, Michigan in 1902, and in 1904 became a chemist with the Bausch & Lomb Optical Company. During World War I he was consulting chemist to the nitrate division of the U.S. Army Ordnance Bureau.
