= Edward R. Weidlein =

American chemist (1887–1983)

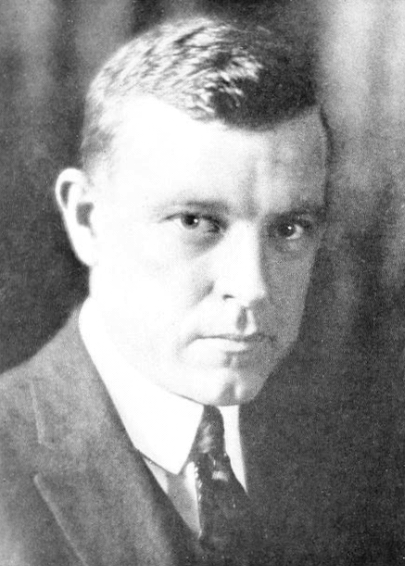
- Weidlein in a 1923 publication
- Born: Edward Ray Weidlein; July 14, 1887; Augusta, Kansas, U.S.
- Died: August 15, 1983 (aged 96); Rector, Pennsylvania, U.S.
- Resting place: Ligonier Valley Cemetery
- Education: University of Kansas (BA, MA)
- Occupation: Chemist
- Children: 3

Edward Ray Weidlein (July 14, 1887 – August 15, 1983) was an American chemist and later director, chairman, and president at the Mellon Institute of Industrial Research in Pittsburgh. He served as president of the American Institute of Chemical Engineers from 1927 to 1929 and the American Chemical Society in 1937. His awards included the Chemical Industry Medal in 1935, the Priestley Medal in 1948 and the AIChE Founders Award for Outstanding Contributions to the Field of Chemical Engineering in 1966. He was a member of the War Industries Board in World War I and helped develop the synthetic rubber production program for the United States in World War II.

== Early life ==
Edward Ray Weidlein was born in Augusta, Kansas, on July 14, 1887. His father was a rancher and oil developer. He studied at the University of Kansas, earning a B.A. degree in 1909 and an M.A. degree in 1910. He spent four years as a Mellon fellow on metallurgical research in Arizona and Nevada.

== Career ==
In November 1916, Weidlein moved to Pittsburgh to work as assistant director of the Mellon Institute of Industrial Research in Oakland. Later that year, he became associate director. He became director of the institute in 1921 and served until his appointment as president and chairman of the board of trustees in 1951. He retired on March 31, 1956.

During World War I, Weidlein served as a technical advisor to the chemical division of the War Industries Board. During World War II, he helped develop the American synthetic rubber production program.

Weidlein served as president of the American Institute of Chemical Engineers from 1927 to 1929. He served as president of the American Chemical Society in 1937. In 1947, he was chairman of the Allegheny Conference on Community Development. He served in the conference from 1944 to 1950. He advocated for the control of smoke emissions in the Pittsburgh area.

== Personal life ==
Weidlein had three sons, Edward R. Jr., Robert B. and John D.

Weidlein died at his home in Rector, Pennsylvania, on August 15, 1983. He was buried at Ligonier Valley Cemetery.

== Awards ==
Weidlein received an honorary Sc.D. degree from Tufts College in 1924 and an honorary LL.D. degree from the University of Pittsburgh in 1930. He was made a fellow of the American Association for the Advancement of Science in 1925. Weidlein received a second honorary Sc.D. degree from the University of Miami in 1953.

In 1935, Weidlein received the Chemical Industry Medal. He received the Priestley Medal from the American Chemical Society in 1948. In 1966, he received the AIChE Founders Award for Outstanding Contributions to the Field of Chemical Engineering.
