= Patterson–Crane Award =

The Patterson–Crane Award, previously the Austin M. Patterson Award, is an award for contributions to chemical information and is sponsored by the Columbus and Dayton sections of the American Chemical Society.

The Austin M. Patterson award was established in 1949 and its first recipient was Austin M. Patterson, in recognition of his work on chemical nomenclature and as editor of Chemical Abstracts. In 1975 the award was renamed to commemorate also Evan J. Crane, who edited Chemical Abstracts 1915–1958, and who had received the award in 1953.

The Patterson-Crane Award acknowledges “meritorious contributions in the field of chemical literature and especially in the documentation of chemistry.” The award, which, prior to the COVID-19 pandemic, was presented in odd-numbered years, consists of a personalized commendation and an honorarium of $3,000.

An international honor, the Patterson-Crane Award acknowledges outstanding contributions to the field of chemical information science, including the design, development, production or management of chemical information systems or services; electronic access to and retrieval of chemical information; critically evaluated data compilations; information technology applications in chemistry; or other significant chemical documentation, including production of original works, editorial works, or chemical library work.

Past recipients of this international award have included research chemists who made major contributions to the information aspects of their specialties, as well as scientists who devoted full time to information activities and their management.

== Winners of the award ==
Source: American Chemical Society

- 1949 – Austin M. Patterson
- 1951 – Arthur B. Lamb
- 1953 – Evan J. Crane
- 1955 – Howard S. Nutting
- 1957 – Melvin G. Mellon
- 1959 – Leonard T. Capell
- 1961 – G. Malcolm Dyson
- 1963 – W. Albert Noyes Jr.
- 1965 – Elmer Hockett
- 1967 – Melville L. Wolfrom
- 1969 – Herman Skolnik
- 1971 – Charles D. Hurd
- 1973 – Pieter E. Verkade
- 1975 – William J. Wiswesser
- 1977 – Benjamin H. Weil
- 1979 – Dale B. Baker
- 1981 – W. Conard Fernelius
- 1983 – Eugene Garfield
- 1985 – Bruno J. Zwolinski
- 1987 – Kurt L. Loening
- 1989 – George E. Vladutz
- 1991 – David R. Lide, Jr.
- 1993 – Hideaki Chihara
- 1995 – Arthur E. Martell
- 1997 – Derek Horton
- 1999 – Stephen E. Stein
- 2001 – Gerard P. Moss
- 2003 – Robert J. Massie
- 2005 – Gilles Klopman
- 2007 – Gary D. Wiggins
- 2010 – Peter Willett
- 2015 – Stephen Heller
- 2018 – Paul Weiss

== See also ==
- List of computer science awards
- List of chemistry awards
- List of prizes named after people
