= Bryce Crawford =

American chemist (1914–2011)

- Born: November 27, 1914; New Orleans, Louisiana
- Died: September 16, 2011 (aged 96); Arden Hills, Minnesota
- Education: Stanford University
- Awards: National Academy of Sciences; Priestley Medal
- Scientific career
- Fields: Physical Chemistry
- Workplaces: University of Minnesota

Bryce Low Crawford Jr. (November 27, 1914 – September 16, 2011) was an American scientist. He worked for decades as a professor of physical chemistry in the University of Minnesota.

== Awards and honors ==
Crawford has been a member of the National Academy of Sciences since 1956. He was elected in 1962 a Fellow of the American Physical Society, a member of the American Philosophical Society in 1971, and a member of the American Academy of Arts and Sciences in 1977. Among his awards are the Priestley Medal in 1982.
