= Mary Engle Pennington =

American bacteriological chemist and refrigeration engineer (1872–1952)

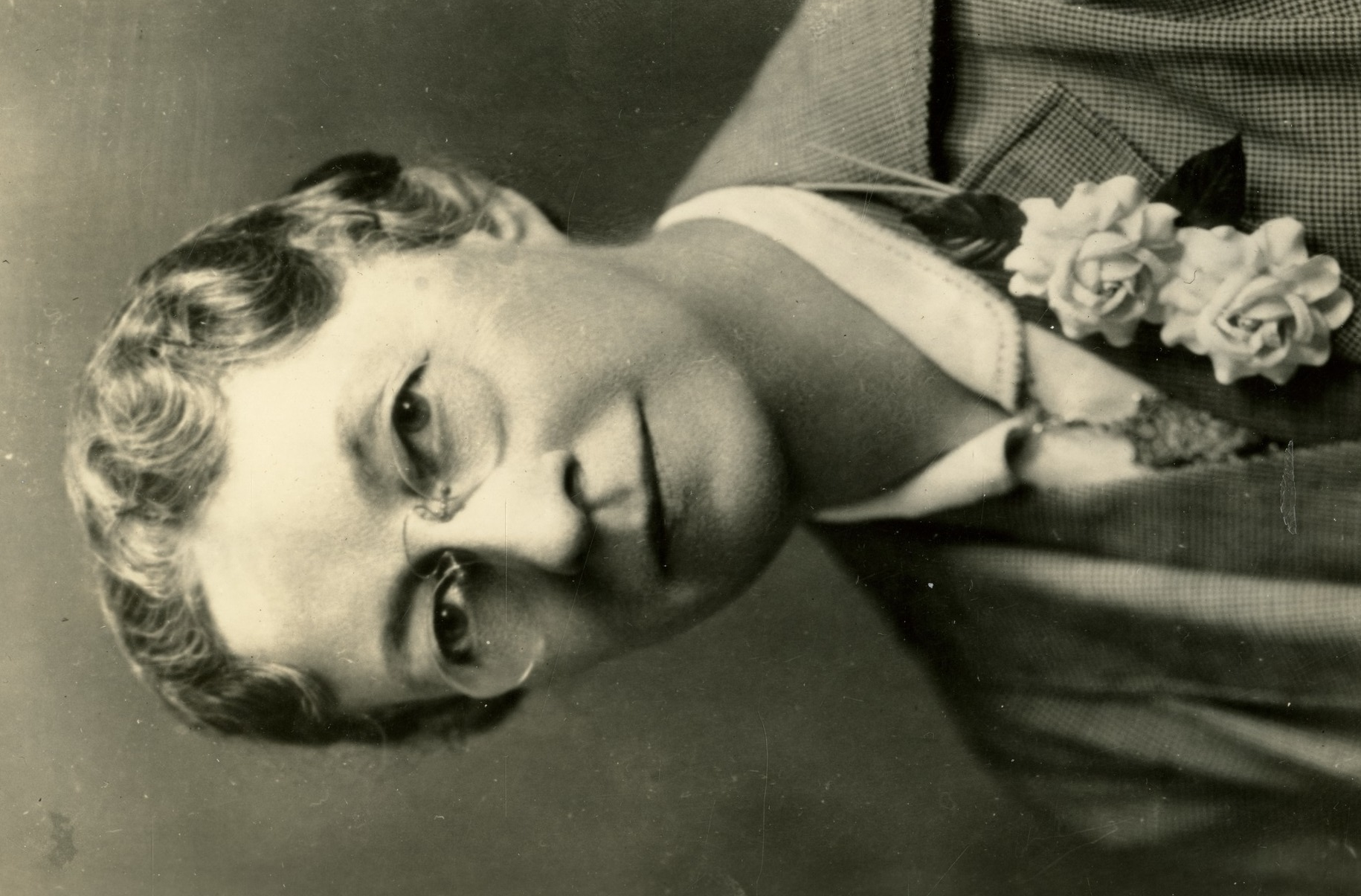
- Pennington in 1940
- Born: October 8, 1872; Nashville, Tennessee, U.S.
- Died: December 27, 1952 (aged 80); New York, U.S.
- Resting place: Laurel Hill Cemetery, Philadelphia, Pennsylvania, U.S.
- Education: University of Pennsylvania; Yale University
- Awards: Garvan–Olin Medal (1940); National Women's Hall of Fame; ASHRAE Hall of Fame; National Inventors Hall of Fame
- Scientific career
- Fields: Bacteriological chemist Refrigeration engineer
- Workplaces: Yale University

Mary Engle Pennington (October 8, 1872 – December 27, 1952) was an American bacteriological chemist, food scientist and refrigeration engineer. She was an innovator in the preservation, handling, storage, and transportation of perishable foods and the first female lab chief at the U.S. Food and Drug Administration. She was awarded 5 patents (3 of which were shared), received the Notable Service Medal from President Herbert Hoover, and received the Garvin-Olin Medal from the American Chemical Society. She is an inductee of the National Inventor's Hall of Fame, the National Women's Hall of Fame and the ASHRAE Hall of Fame.

== Early life and education ==
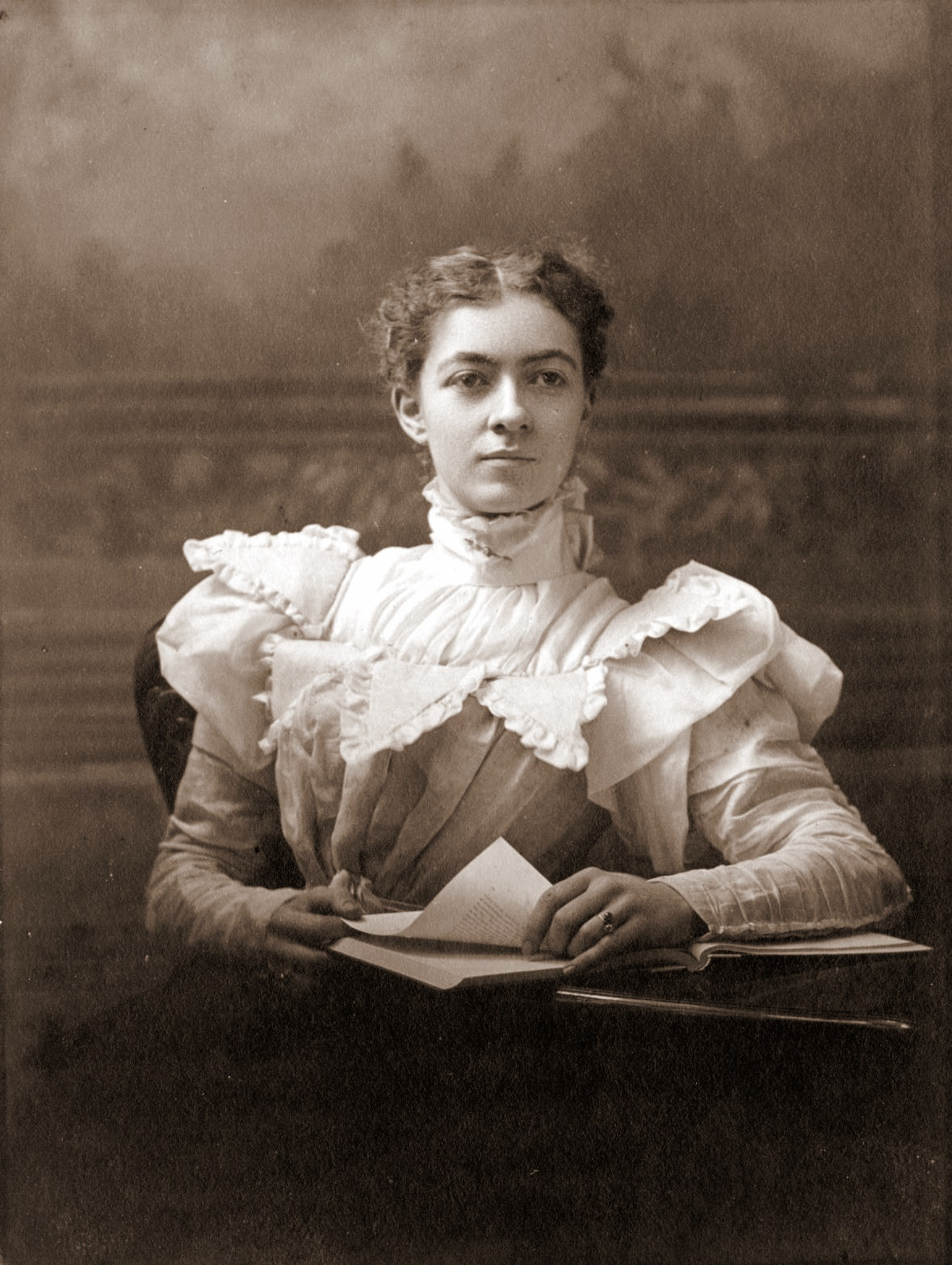
Pennington as a young girl.

Pennington was born on October 8, 1872, in Nashville, Tennessee, to Henry and Sarah Malony Pennington. Shortly after her birth, her parents moved to Philadelphia to be closer to her mother's Quaker relatives. She became interested in chemistry at the age of 12 after reading a library book on medicinal chemistry. She walked to the University of Pennsylvania and asked a professor for help with the terminology she did not understand. She was told to come back when she was older.

She entered the University of Pennsylvania in 1890 and completed the requirements for a B.S. degree in chemistry with minors in botany and zoology in 1892. However, since the University of Pennsylvania did not grant degrees to women at this time, she was given a certificate of proficiency instead of a degree.

Pennington received her Ph.D. from the University of Pennsylvania in 1895. Her thesis was entitled "Derivatives of Columbium and Tantalum." From 1895 to 1896, she was a university fellow in botany at the University of Pennsylvania. She was a fellow in physiological chemistry at Yale University from 1897 to 1899, and conducted research with Lafayette Mendel and Russell Henry Chittenden.

== Career ==
In 1898, she founded the Philadelphia Clinical Laboratory and conducted bacteriological analyses. She educated farmers on the handling of raw milk in order to improve the safety of ice cream sold at local schools. In the same year, she accepted a position with the Women's Medical College of Pennsylvania as director of their clinical laboratory. She also served as a research worker in the department of hygiene at the University of Pennsylvania from 1898 to 1901, and was a bacteriologist with the Philadelphia Bureau of Health. In her position with the Bureau of Health, she was instrumental in improving sanitation standards for the handling of milk and milk products.

=== U.S. Department of Agriculture ===
In 1905, Pennington worked for the U.S. Department of Agriculture Bureau of Chemistry, which later became the U.S. Food and Drug Administration. Her director at the Bureau of Chemistry, Harvey W. Wiley, encouraged her to apply for a position as chief of the newly created Food Research Laboratory, which had been established to enforce the Pure Food and Drug Act of 1906. She was submitted to the position under the name M.E. Pennington in order to hide her gender. She accepted the position in 1907 and became the first female lab chief. One of her major accomplishments was the development of standards for the safe processing of chickens raised for human consumption. She also served as head of an investigation of refrigerated boxcar design and served on Herbert Hoover's War Food Administration during World War I.

=== Refrigeration engineer and consultant ===
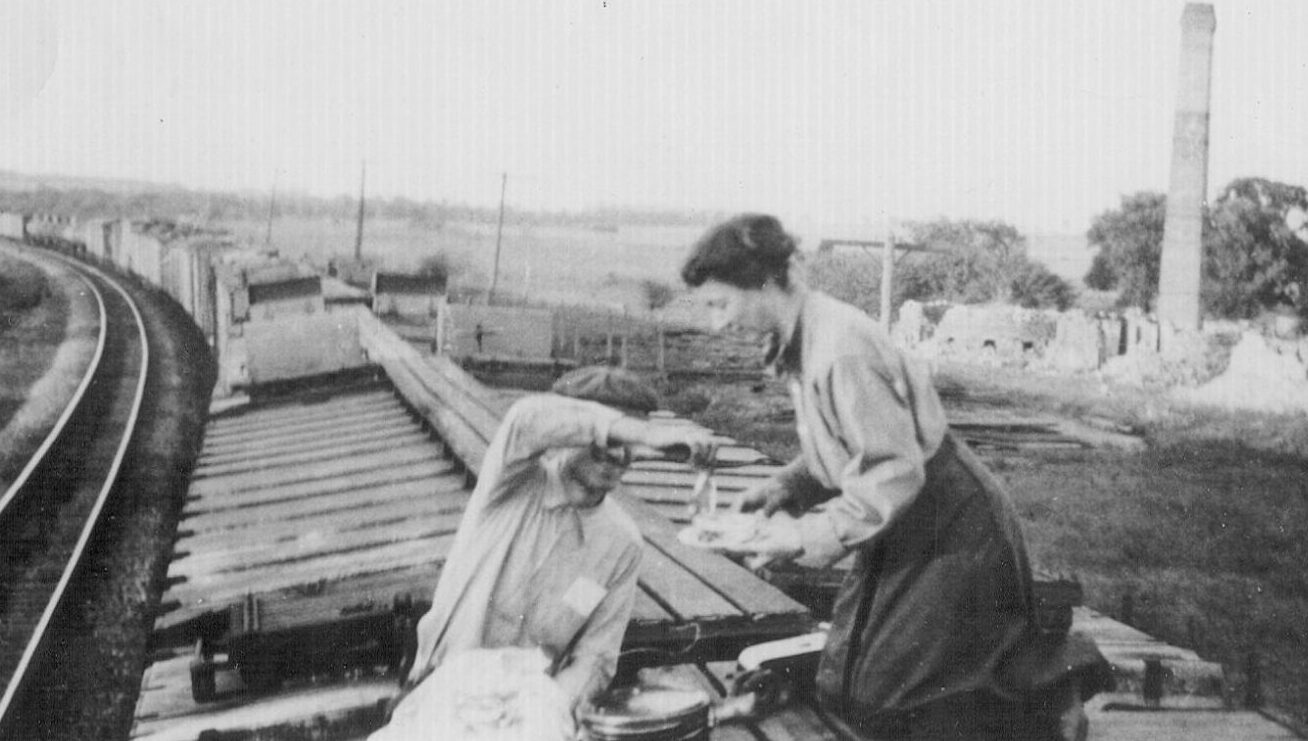
Pennington on a railcar in 1910 collecting food samples

Pennington's involvement with refrigerated boxcar design at the Food Research Laboratory led to an interest in the entire process of transporting and storing perishable food, including both refrigerated transport and home refrigeration. During her time with the laboratory, Pennington and Howard Castner Pierce were awarded a U.S. patent for an all-metal poultry-cooling rack for the cooling and grading of poultry, rabbits, and game.

In 1919, Pennington accepted a position with a private firm, American Balsa, which manufactured insulation for refrigeration units. She left the firm in 1922 to start her own consulting business, which she ran until her retirement in 1952. She founded the Household Refrigeration Bureau in 1923 to educate consumers in safe practices in domestic refrigeration. Much of her work in the 1920s was supported by the National Association of Ice Industries (NAII), an association of independent icemakers and distributors who delivered ice to the home for use in iceboxes, before the widespread availability of electric refrigerators. With NAII support, she published pamphlets on home food safety, including The Care of the Child's Food in the Home (1925) and Cold is the Absence of Heat (1927).

=== Patents ===
In 1913 Pennington and Howard Castner Pierce were issued a U.S. patent for an all-metal poultry-cooling rack for the cooling and grading of poultry, rabbits, and game.

In 1927 she and Alex Brooking Davis were issued a U.S. patent for the manufacture of strawboard.

In 1932 she was issued a U.S. patent for a scale for determining the color of egg meat.

In 1935 she and Arthur W. Thomas were issued a U.S. patent for a method of treating eggs.

Later in 1935, she was issued a U.S. patent for a method for freezing eggs.

== Memberships ==
She was a member of the American Chemical Society and the Society of Biological Chemists. She became a Fellow of the American Association for the Advancement of Science in 1947, and was also a Fellow of the American Society of Refrigerating Engineers.

She was also a member of the Philadelphia Pathological Society, Sigma Xi, and the Kappa Kappa Gamma sorority.

== Awards received while alive ==
In 1919, she was awarded the Notable Service Medal by President Herbert Hoover for her work in refrigeration. In 1940, she became the second recipient of the Garvan–Olin Medal, then called the Francis P. Garvan Medal, from the American Chemical Society.

== Death ==
Pennington died on December 27, 1952, in New York, and was interred at Laurel Hill Cemetery in Philadelphia, Pennsylvania.

== Posthumous recognition ==
In 1959 she became the first woman elected to the Poultry Historical Society Hall of Fame. She was inducted into the National Women's Hall of Fame in 2002, the American Society of Heating, Refrigerating and Air-Conditioning Engineers Hall of Fame in 2007, and the National Inventors Hall of Fame in 2018.

== Publications ==
- Derivatives of Columbium and Tantalum, J. Am. Chem. Soc. 1896, 18, 1, 38–67, January 1, 1896
- Studies of Poultry from the Farm to the Consumer, Washington, D.C.: U.S. Department of Agriculture, 1910
- The Refrigeration of Dressed Poultry in Transit, U.S. Department of Agriculture, 1913
- How to Kill and Bleed Market Poultry, Washington D.C.: U.S. Government Printing Office, 1915
- A Study of the Preparation of Frozen and Dried Eggs in the Producing Section, Washington, D.C.: U.S. Department of Agriculture, 1916
- How to Candle Eggs, Washington D.C.: U.S. Department of Agriculture, 1918
- The Prevention of Breakage of Eggs in Transit When Shipped in Carlots, Washington, D.C.: U.S. Department of Agriculture, 1918
