= Ralph Connor (scientist) =

American chemist (1907-1990)

Ralph Connor (1907-1990) was an American chemist. Connor is best known for his research in organic chemistry, catalysis, synthesis, explosives, and reaction mechanisms.

He served as a division chief on the National Defense Research Committee in World War II, and received many honors including the 1965 Chemical Industry Medal, Priestley Medal of the American Chemical Society in 1967, Great Britain's King's Medal for Service in the Cause of Freedom, and the Gold Medal of the American Institute of Chemists, among others.
