= George Vladutz =

Romanian-american computational chemist

- Born: 1928; Oradea, Romania
- Died: 1989 (aged 60–61)
- Education: Polytechnical Institute, Bucharest; Leningrad Technological Institute; Mendeleev Institute for Chemical Technology; Institute for Organic Chemistry of the Elements, Moscow
- Known for: Chemical Reaction Databases, Chemical Information Systems
- Awards: Patterson-Crane Award (1989)
- Scientific career
- Fields: Chemoinformatics
- Workplaces: All-Union Institute of Scientific and Technical Information (VINITI), University of Sheffield, Institute for Scientific Information (ISI)

George Vladutz (1928–1989) (alternative spelling: Vleduts) was a Romanian-born chemoinformatician known for his contributions to chemical information systems and scientometrics. His work on reaction databases laid the foundations for computer-aided synthesis planning.

== Early life and education ==
Born in Oradea, Romania, in 1928, Vladutz began his studies in chemical engineering at the Bucharest Polytechnic Institute in 1946. He earned an M.Sc. in Chemical Engineering and Organic Dyestuff Chemistry from the Leningrad Technological Institute in 1952 and a Ph.D. in Organic Synthesis from the Mendeleev Institute for Chemical Technology in Moscow in 1956. His doctoral thesis was titled "The Synthesis of Bz-isoquinoline Alkaloids." In 1967, he received a D.Sc. in Chemical Information Science from the Institute for Organic Chemistry of the Elements in Moscow, with a thesis on "The Design and Development of Information Retrieval Systems for Organic Chemistry".

== Career in the Soviet Union ==
From 1958 to 1974, Vladutz worked at the All-Union Institute of Scientific and Technical Information (VINITI) of the USSR Academy of Sciences in Moscow. He held positions including director of chemical information systems, head of the Laboratory of Chemical Information Systems, and head of the Department of Semiotics. During this period, he supervised 14 doctoral students.

== Emigration and work in the West ==
In 1974, Vladutz applied for an exit visa from the Soviet Union, leading to his removal from official posts. After receiving the visa in 1975, he held an honorary position with the Consiglio Nazionale della Ricerca in Rome. He then became a British Library Visiting Research Fellow at the Postgraduate School of Librarianship and Information Science at the University of Sheffield, as a colleague of Peter Willett. There, he contributed to developing a new approach to the automatic indexing of organic reactions using Maximum common subgraph isomorphism algorithms, which became foundational for many reaction database systems.

In 1976, Vladutz moved to the United States and joined the Institute for Scientific Information (ISI) in Philadelphia as a senior research associate. He worked on textual and chemical documentation problems, notably developing the Key Word/Phrase Subject Index for ISI products. In 1981, he became manager for basic research at ISI, directing projects in automatic indexing and retrieval, including the development of bibliographic coupling techniques for associative searching of large journal citation files.

== Scientific contributions ==
In 1963, his paper, "Concerning One System of Classification and Coding Chemical Reactions", was influential in suggesting the use of computers to index chemical reaction data and identify synthetic pathways. This work has been instrumental in the development of computer-aided retrosynthetic analysis and had significant impact on the development of chemoinformatics as a discipline.

According to Ugi et al., Vladutz impacted the development of chemoinformatics from 1960 onward through his introduction of computer- and database-oriented chemical structure and reaction organization, in addition to the retrieval of same. He proposed the use of computers to develop multistep organic syntheses. These ideas were particularly influential to Elias James Corey and co-workers, who created the chemical synthesis program LHASA at the Harvard University in 1967.

Vladutz published three monographs, including "Automatic Information Systems in Chemistry" (1973), co-authored with Geyvandov, and over 70 articles.

== Professional activities and recognition ==
He was active in the Chemical Information Division of the American Chemical Society, organizing and chairing several meetings. In 1989, he received the Patterson-Crane Award from the Dayton, OH, Branch of the American Chemical Society for his contributions to chemical information science.

== Personal life ==
Vladutz was fluent in Romanian, Hungarian, Russian, English, French, Italian, and German. He died in 1989, leaving behind a wife and two children.
