= Retrosynthetic analysis =

Technique for solving problems in the planning of organic syntheses

Retrosynthetic analysis is a technique for solving problems in the planning of organic syntheses. This is achieved by transforming a target molecule into simpler precursor structures regardless of any potential reactivity or interaction with reagents. Each precursor material is examined using the same method. This procedure is repeated until simple or commercially available structures are reached. These simpler or commercially available compounds can be used to form a synthesis of the target molecule. Retrosynthetic analysis was used as early as 1917 in Robinson's total synthesis of tropinone. Important conceptual work on retrosynthetic analysis was published by George Vladutz in 1963. E.J. Corey formalized and popularized the concept from 1967 onwards in his article General methods for the construction of complex molecules and his book The Logic of Chemical Synthesis.

The power of retrosynthetic analysis becomes evident in the design of a synthesis. The goal of retrosynthetic analysis is a structural simplification. Often, a synthesis will have more than one possible synthetic route. Retrosynthesis is well suited for discovering different synthetic routes and comparing them in a logical and straightforward fashion. A database may be consulted at each stage of the analysis, to determine whether a component already exists in the literature. In that case, no further exploration of that compound would be required. If that compound exists, it can be a jumping-off point for further steps developed to reach a synthesis.

There are academic and commercial groups developing retrosynthesis tools. With the growing application of machine learning and artificial intelligence in chemistry, many research groups, such as the Coley Group from MIT, and companies, such as Chemical.AI and Reaxys, have started to integrate deep learning into the conventional rule-based approaches.

== Definitions ==
Disconnection
A retrosynthetic step involving the breaking of a bond to form two (or more) synthons.
Retron
A minimal molecular substructure that enables certain transformations.
Retrosynthetic tree
A directed acyclic graph of several (or all) possible retrosyntheses of a single target.
Synthon
A fragment of a compound that assists in the formation of a synthesis, derived from that target molecule. A synthon and the corresponding commercially available synthetic equivalent are shown below:

Target
The desired final compound.
Transform
The reverse of a synthetic reaction; the formation of starting materials from a single product.

== Example ==
Shown below is a retrosynthetic analysis of phenylacetic acid:

Retrosynthetic analysis of phenylacetic acid

In planning the synthesis, two synthons are identified: a nucleophilic –COOH group and an electrophilic PhCH^{+}_{2} group. Both synthons do not exist as written; synthetic equivalents corresponding to the synthons are reacted to produce the desired product. In this case, the cyanide anion is the synthetic equivalent for the –COOH synthon, while benzyl bromide is the synthetic equivalent for the benzyl synthon.

The synthesis of phenylacetic acid determined by retrosynthetic analysis is thus:

PhCH_{2}Br + NaCN → PhCH_{2}CN + NaBr
PhCH_{2}CN + 2 H_{2}O → PhCH_{2}COOH + NH_{3}

In fact, phenylacetic acid has been synthesized from benzyl cyanide, itself prepared by the analogous reaction of benzyl bromide with sodium cyanide.

== Strategies ==
=== Functional group strategies ===
Manipulation of functional groups can lead to significant reductions in molecular complexity.

=== Stereochemical strategies ===
Numerous chemical targets have distinct stereochemical demands. Stereochemical transformations (such as the Claisen rearrangement and Mitsunobu reaction) can remove or transfer the desired chirality, thus simplifying the target.

=== Structure-goal strategies ===
Directing a synthesis toward a desirable intermediate can greatly narrow the focus of analysis. This allows bidirectional search techniques.

=== Transform-based strategies ===
The application of transformations to retrosynthetic analysis can lead to powerful reductions in molecular complexity. Unfortunately, powerful transform-based retrons are rarely present in complex molecules, and additional synthetic steps are often needed to establish their presence.

=== Topological strategies ===
The identification of one or more key bond disconnections may lead to the identification of key substructures or difficult-to-identify rearrangement transformations in order to identify the key structures.

- Disconnections that preserve ring structures are encouraged.
- Disconnections that create rings larger than 7 members are discouraged.
- Disconnection involves creativity.

== See also ==
- Organic synthesis
- Total synthesis
