= James A. Rafferty =

Chemical industrialist working at Union Carbide

Portrait of James A. Rafferty (1886-1951), Chemical Industrialist with Union Carbide

James A. Rafferty, Vice President, Officers' Committee member, Director, and member of the executive committee of Union Carbide, was an important figure in the petrochemical industry. Rafferty guided Union Carbide's effort in developing the new industry of synthetic aliphatic chemicals (aliphatic compounds are one of the two main branches within organic chemistry) and was instrumental in the development of the liquid oxygen industry. Rafferty directed Union Carbide's collaboration with the United States government for the Manhattan Project and with the War Production Board for the synthetic rubber program during World War II.

Rafferty was born in Chicago, Illinois on May 4, 1886, and studied engineering and chemistry at the Illinois Institute of Technology (where Rafferty would later become a Trustee). After graduation in 1908, Rafferty worked for the People's Gas, Light, and Coke Company and then in 1917 joined the Linde Air Products Company, which later merged with three other companies to become Union Carbide.

Rafferty became general manager of the newly formed Union Carbide subsidiary, the Carbide and Carbon Chemicals Corporation (CCCC) in 1920. He became vice president in 1924, President in 1929, and chairman of the board in 1944. He was made president of the Bakelite Corporation in 1939 and Chairman of Bakelite in 1944. Under Rafferty's leadership, Carbide and Carbon Chemicals Corporation went on to become the second largest chemical company in the United States by 1948.

Rafferty became a Vice President of Union Carbide, the parent company of the CCCC, in 1938, a Director in 1941, and a member of the executive committee in 1944. Rafferty served as Chairman of the Union Carbide's new product development committee until his death on December 19, 1951.

As a result of lifetime achievements, Rafferty was awarded the Chemical Industry Medal in 1948.

== The Manhattan Project ==
Under the auspices of the Manhattan Project, Rafferty directed Union Carbide's efforts to enrich uranium (some of which was mined by another Union Carbide subsidiary: the United States Vanadium Corporation) for use in an atomic bomb. This effort culminated in Union Carbide designing (along with the Kellex Corporation), building, and operating the massive K-25 gaseous diffusion plant at Oak Ridge.

General Leslie Groves wrote of Rafferty:

"No one outside the project can ever appreciate how much we depended on you and how well you performed you well-nigh impossible task."

"Few men were more important in the production of the atomic bomb than he was."

- General Leslie R. Groves

Stéphane Groueff, in his book chronicling the Manhattan Project, had this to say about Rafferty:

In every company he dealt with, [Leslie] Groves had a general rule: always try to deal directly with the person who could issue an order that nobody else could countermand. And this did not necessarily mean the president or the chairman of the board. Every company was run in a different way, and often it took some inquiring to find out who was the driving spirit, the executive with the real power of authority in a large corporation.

However, at Union Carbide, even though it was a huge organization with several, nearly autonomous subsidiaries, Groves did not have to search very far. It was common knowledge at Union Carbide that one of the driving forces behind the company's spectacular growth was the executive vice-president, James A. Rafferty.

…

"In recognition of his being 'the workhorse of the Carbide backfield,' " read an article in Chemical and Engineering News, "Rafferty was made vice-president of Union Carbide and Carbon Corporation, the parent corporation of all Carbide units, in 1939. This did little to destroy the idea held by some, however, that over 100 men named James A. Rafferty worked for Union Carbide and its many units."

An executive with drive and vision, Rafferty contributed tremendously to the birth and fantastic growth of a new industry in America: synthetics made from petroleum rather than from coal, as they had been formerly. In his field, Rafferty was hailed as one of the great "makers of the chemical industry." To him the word synthetic denoted something worthy: a material of uniform quality, designed for a particular purpose; a man-made product far superior to a natural material.

When Leslie Groves was ushered into Rafferty's oak-paneled office, the two men liked each other at sight. Groves realized immediately that he was talking to someone who loved action and efficiency, a man who would push things ahead. As for Rafferty, he was a firm believer in the American system of free enterprise and the importance of industry's participation in the war effort. It was not difficult for the general to convince Rafferty that his corporation should help the Manhattan Project. "The American chemical industry thus far has benefited tremendously from the stimulating atmosphere of American free enterprise," Rafferty used to say. "During several visits to Europe, I studied industries abroad and compared them with our own. I feel that the well-being and national security of a nation is in proportion to the success and extent of its industries." Rafferty was impressed by Groves's earnest persuasion; he promised to discuss the matter with the top people of those Carbide units that would be involved.

- Groueff, Stéphane. Manhattan Project: The Untold Story of the Making of the Atomic Bomb. [1st ed.] Boston, Little, Brown, 1967.

On June 1, 1945, prominent industrialists, including Rafferty, were invited to the second meeting of the Interim Committee. The industrialists were introduced to the committee as follows:

Mr. George H. Bucher, President of Westinghouse - manufacture of equipment for the electromagnetic process.

Mr. Walter S. Carpenter, President of Du Pont Company - construction of the Hanford Project.

Mr. James Rafferty, Vice President of Union Carbide - construction and operation of gas diffusion plant in Clinton.

Mr. James White, President of Tennessee Eastman - production of basic chemicals and construction of the RDX plant at Holston, Tennessee.

Tennessee Eastman also managed and operated the Y-12 facility at Oak Ridge. In 1947 Union Carbide took over the operation of Y-12.

The graphite for the Hanford B Reactor as well as the Oak Ridge X-10 Reactor was produced by another Union Carbide subsidiary National Carbon Company.

== World War II: Synthetic Rubber Program ==
After Pearl Harbor, the United States was effectively cut off from its supply of natural rubber and a large scale synthetic rubber production process needed to be invented and commercialized. Rafferty led Union Carbide's efforts in producing butadiene which would then be polymerized in a synthetic rubber production process.

The Baruch Committee in 1941 had reported to President Roosevelt: "Of all critical and strategic materials, rubber is the one which presents the greatest threat to the safety of our nation and the success of the Allied cause. If we fail to secure a large new rubber supply quickly, our war effort and domestic economy will collapse."

William M. Jeffers, leader of Union Pacific Railroad and first Rubber Director for the War Production Board, had this to say of Rafferty:

As my final contribution to the rubber program, I want to say to you with all sincerity that had it not been for you and your great organization, the people who look upon rubber as tires would have been forced to the conclusion that the rubber program was more or less of a failure and so I feel it is fair to say and it is accurate to say that had it not been for the contribution of Carbide and Carbon Chemicals Corporation, this program could not have succeeded. -William M. Jeffers

Bradley Dewey, co-founder of the Dewey & Almy Chemical Company and the second Rubber Director for the War Production Board, said of Rafferty:

Before winding up my affairs with the synthetic rubber program, I wish to express my appreciation for the magnificent performance of your organization in the production of raw materials for the GR-S [general-purpose synthetic rubbers formed by copolymerization of emulsions of styrene and butadiene; used in tires and other rubber products; previously also known as Buna-S, currently known as SBR (styrene-butadiene rubber)]. The Carbide and Carbon Chemicals Corporation should be extremely proud of the part it has played in the success of the synthetic rubber program. Without you this country might well have met with disaster. - Bradley Dewey
