= Edward G. Jefferson =

British chemist

- Born: July 15, 1921; London, England
- Died: February 9, 2006 (aged 84); Wilmington, Delaware
- Education: King's College London
- Occupations: President & Chief Operating Officer of DuPont; 1980; Chairman & Chief Executive Officer of DuPont; 1981
- Spouse: Naomi Love
- Children: 4

Edward G. Jefferson (July 15, 1921, London – February 9, 2006) was a British-born American chemical engineer, chemist, businessman, CEO and Chairman of DuPont corporation. During Jefferson's leadership as chairman, DuPont suffered from numerous controversies; such as polluting public waterways.

== Early life ==
Jefferson served in the Royal Artillery during World War II and took part in the Normandy invasion in 1944. He later graduated with honors in chemistry from King's College at the University of London, where he also received a doctorate.

== Career ==
He joined DuPont in 1951, and was named the chief operating officer and president of the company in 1980 and was named the chairman and CEO in 1981 before retiring from the company in 1986. In 1981, while the chief operating officer and president of DuPont, Jefferson led the acquisition of Conoco and during his tenure pushed biochemical and bioengineering initiatives.

Jefferson also served on the University of Delaware board of trustees between 1980 and 1997 when he retired from the board and was awarded trustee emeritus status. He served on multiple other educational boards such as the advisory board for the School of International and Public Affairs at Columbia University and as a trustee for the University of Pennsylvania and Tuskegee University. Jefferson was also a Robert S. Hatfield fellow in economic education at Cornell and a Warren K. Lewis lecturer at MIT.

Jefferson was a member of the American Philosophical Society, a member of the American Academy of Arts and Sciences, a trustee of the Academy of Natural Sciences, and a member of the National Academy of Engineering (elected in 1986 "for outstanding research leadership and exceptional contributions to university-industry cooperation in science and engineering, and for creative direction of one of the world’s largest industrial organizations"). He was also a member of the American Section of the Society of Chemical Industry, the American Institute of Chemical Engineers, a former member of the President's Export Council and a member of US Council for International Business amongst others.

== Personal life ==
At his death he had been married to his wife Naomi Love for 52 years and was predeceased by two of his four sons.
