= Vincent A. Calarco =

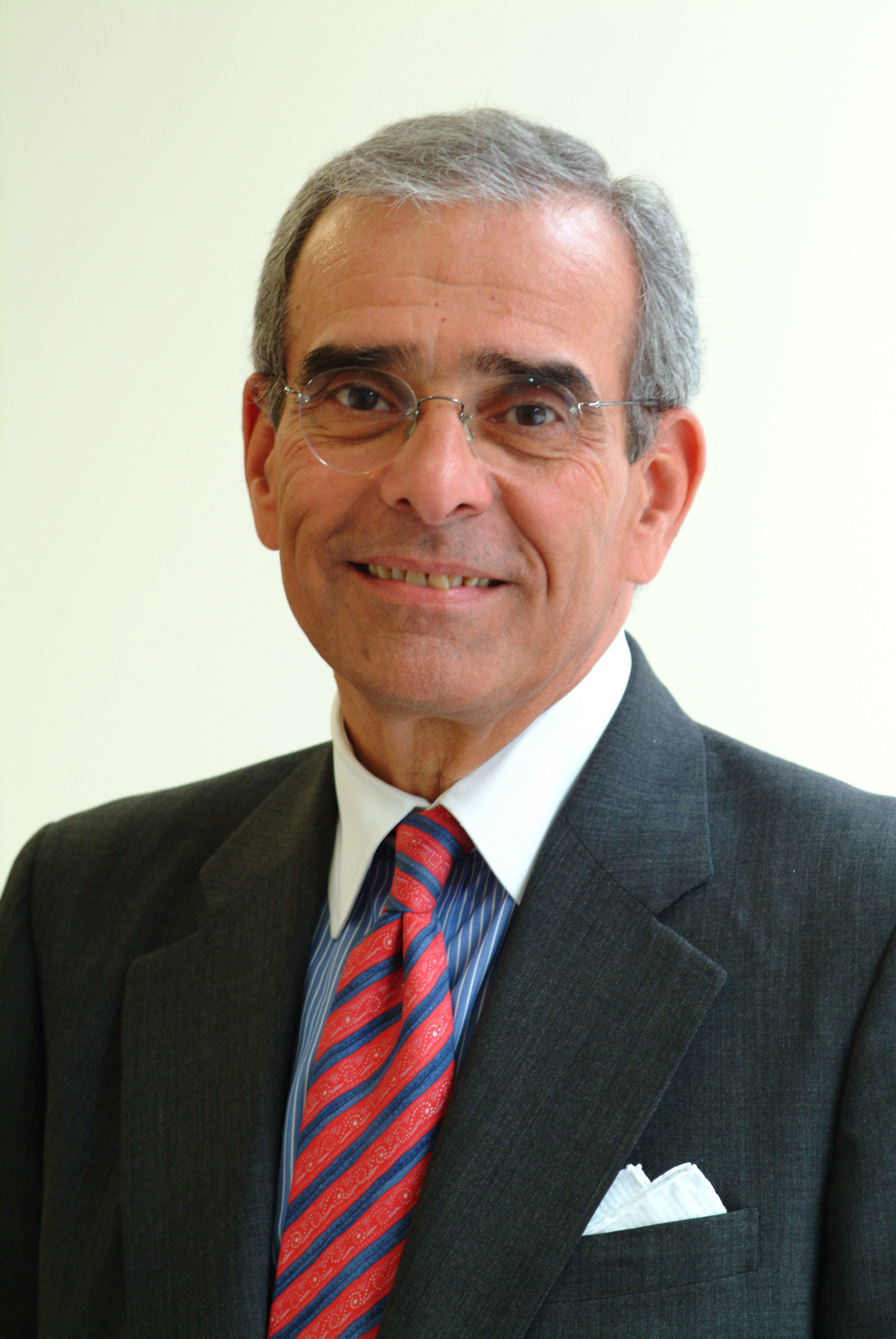
- Born: May 29, 1942; New York, New York, United States
- Education: Harvard Business School, Polytechnic Institute of New York University

Vincent A. Calarco (born May 29, 1942) is a former Chief Executive Officer and President at Chemtura. He has a BS from Polytechnic Institute of New York University and an MBA from Harvard University.

He has been awarded the highest honor by the American Chemical Society, and is regarded as one of the strongest CEOs in the specialty chemicals industry.
