= Industrial & Engineering Chemistry Research =

- Discipline: Chemical engineering Process engineering
- Language: English
- Edited by: Michael Baldea

Publication details
- Former name(s): Journal of Industrial & Engineering Chemistry, Industrial & Engineering Chemistry, Industrial & Engineering Chemistry Research
- History: 1909–present
- Publisher: American Chemical Society (United States)
- Frequency: Biweekly
- Impact factor: 4.2 (2022)

Standard abbreviations
- ISO 4: Ind. Eng. Chem. Res.

Indexing
- CODEN: IECRED
- ISSN: 0888-5885 (print); 1520-5045 (web)
- LCCN: 87649813
- OCLC no.: 13659424

Links
- Journal homepage; Online access; Online archive

Industrial & Engineering Chemistry Research is a peer-reviewed scientific journal published by the American Chemical Society covering all aspects of chemical engineering. The editor-in-chief is Michael Baldea (University of Texas at Austin).

== History ==
The journal was established in 1909 as the Journal of Industrial & Engineering Chemistry. It was renamed in 1930 as Industrial & Engineering Chemistry before obtaining its current title in 1970. From 1911 to 1916 it was edited by Milton C. Whitaker. From 1921 to 1942 it was edited by Dr. Harrison E. Howe. From 1962 to 1986, Industrial & Engineering Chemistry Fundamentals was edited by Robert L. Pigford. From 1986 to 2013 the journal was edited by Donald R. Paul, and from 2014 to 2023 by Phillip E. Savage.

The journal I&EC Product Research and Development was established in 1962. It was renamed Product R&D in 1969 and renamed again in 1978 as Industrial & Engineering Chemistry Product Research and Development. In 1986, it and the journals Industrial & Engineering Chemistry Fundamentals and Industrial & Engineering Chemistry Process Design and Development, both also established in 1962, were combined into Industrial & Engineering Chemistry Research.

== Abstracting and indexing ==
The journal is abstracted and indexed in:

- Chemical Abstracts Service
- Scopus
- EBSCOhost
- ProQuest
- Science Citation Index

According to the Journal Citation Reports, the journal has a 2022 impact factor of 4.2.
