= John V. N. Dorr =

American scientist (1872–1962)

- Born: John Van Nostrand Dorr; January 6, 1872; Newark, New Jersey, U.S.
- Died: June 29, 1962 (aged 90); Wallingford, Connecticut, U.S.
- Education: Rutgers University (BS)
- Spouses: Sally Harman Doughty (m. 1897) Ellen Mary Faulkner Swift (m. 1924; died 1928)
- Children: 2
- Awards: John Scott Medal (1916); Chemical Industry Medal (1938); Perkin Medal (1941)
- Scientific career
- Fields: Chemical engineering

John Van Nostrand Dorr (January 6, 1872 – June 29, 1962) was an American industrial chemist and inventor. He is known for developing industrial chemical techniques, like the Dorr classifier, Dorr thickener, and Dorr agitator. He founded Dorr Foundation, which conducted research in the 1950s on the effectiveness of painted lines on road shoulders and its impact on highway safety.

== Early life ==
John Van Nostrand Dorr was born on January 6, 1872, in Newark, New Jersey, to Nancy H. (née Higginson) and John Van Nostrand Dorr. He was taught by his mother, who was founder of the Riverside School in Wallingford, Connecticut. She encouraged Dorr to hike and explore iron and copper mines in New Jersey and to collect specimens.

From 1888 to 1890, Dorr worked in Thomas Edison's laboratory in West Orange, New Jersey, as a chemist and experimenter. He later became a vice president of the Edison Pioneers. He graduated in 1894 with a Bachelor of Science from Rutgers University. He was a member of Zeta Psi.

== Career ==
=== Chemical engineering career ===
Dorr worked as a chemist at a smelter in Deadwood, South Dakota, in the Black Hills. He then learned the cyanide process and spent some time in Colorado before returning to Deadwood. In 1902, he started a partnership with John Lundberg, a mine leaser, and together they operated the Rossiter Mill, a cyanide mill in Fantail Gulch. The mill treated gold ores from Buxton and Bonanza mines, two mines that Lundberg leased. In 1903, Dorr, Lundberg, and a third partner civil engineer A. D. Wilson purchased the mines and built a 100-ton per day wet-crushing cyanide mill on site. Dorr tried the new Moore filter process at the Lundberg, Dorr & Wilson mill. This led to the development, patenting, and manufacturing plans for the Dorr clarifier.

In 1906, Dorr became a consultant for the remodeling of a dry crushing mill of the Mogul Mining Company. While working with the mill, which had trouble with slime collection, he developed a continuous slime thickening method for the flat-bottomed tanks that became known as the Dorr continuous thickener. The Dorr thickener allowed the continuous settling and thickening of ore pulp. In 1910, he developed the Dorr agitator in Ontario, the principle of continuous countercurrent decantation in Arizona, and also the principle of closed circuit grinding. He also invented the Dorr classifier, a practical method for the separation and chemical treatment of fine solids suspended in liquid. His inventions were used in ore dressing, hydrometallurgy, and industrial processes. His extraction process using cyanide solution to precipitate dissolved medal from a solution was used to extract gold, silver, and other materials. His techniques were also used in sewage treatment and water purification. The process was used to desilt the Colorado River, to develop the Imperial Valley, to increase the extraction of sugar from sugar cane and beets, and to produce synthetic fertilizers.

Following his inventions, Dorr planned the manufacturing of them in Denver and Chicago. By then, he was managing two mining properties in the Black Hills. In 1910, Dorr organized the Dorr Cyanide Machinery Company. In 1916, the company became the Dorr Company, Engineersof New York City and began operating worldwide. He served as president and chairman of Dorr Company and Dorr-Oliver Company. His brother Goldthwaite H. Dorr served as the vice president of Dorr Company and was special assistant to the Secretary of War. In 1917, he converted a grist mill on the Saugatuck River into a research facility. By 1926, his office was on Park Avenue in New York City. In 1955, Dorr and Edwin L. Oliver merged the Dorr Company and the Oliver United Filters Company into Dorr-Oliver Inc. of Stamford, Connecticut. Oliver had been involved in the filtration steps in continuous processing. Their company designed and manufactured heavy processing equipment for chemical, pulp, paper, petroleum, metallurgical, food, and sanitary engineers. He was a member of the advisory committee on metals and minerals of the National Research Council. He was also an adviser to the United States House of Representatives's committee on patents. In 1930, he was president of the Zeta Psi fraternity. In 1931, he was president of the United Engineering Trustees. In 1932, he was president of the American Institute of Chemical Engineers. In 1936, he wrote The Cyanidation and Concentration of Gold and Silver Ores. He revised the book in 1950. In 1938, he led the Saugatuck Valley Association in its unsuccessful fight against the Bridgeport Hydraulic Company about property being deemed imminent domain for the Saugatuck Reservoir.

=== Dorr Foundation and highway safety ===
In 1950, Dorr established the Dorr Foundation for establishing grants in chemistry and metallurgy. Following his wife's suggestion, the foundation's vision expanded to promote highway safety. In the early 1950s, Dorr postulated that at night and when rain, snow or fog impaired vision, drivers hugged the white lines painted in the middle of highways. Dorr believed this led to numerous accidents and that painting a white line along the outside shoulders of the highways would save lives. At Dorr's suggestion, the state of Connecticut painted lines on the shoulder of a stretch of the Merritt Parkway near Greenwich. By 1956, the entire length of Merritt Parkway had its shoulders painted. A six month test determined that on a three-mile (4.8 km) strip of the Hutchinson River Parkway, the line had resulted in a reduction of 50% of accidents. However, motorcycle patrols had also increased during that period. He then used his foundation to publicize the demonstration's results. The foundation also sponsored experiments in pre-college scientific education.

== Personal life ==
Dorr married Sally Harman Doughty of Englewood, New Jersey, on April 24, 1897. They had two daughters, Antoinette Nott and Rosalind Higginson. He later married Ellen Mary Faulkner Swift, widow of Samuel Swift, of New York on June 20, 1924. She died in 1928. In 1926, he lived on Park Avenue in New York City. He lived at West Branch in Westport, Connecticut. Later in life, he had homes on 37th Street in New York City and in Washington, Connecticut.

Dorr was a member of the American Institute of Mining and Metallic Engineers, the American Electrochemical Society, the Institute of Mining and Metallurgy of London. He was a life trustee of Rutgers College. He was an Episcopalian and was affiliated with the Republican Party. He was also a member of the University Club of New York, the Engineers Club, the Chemists Club, the Century Club, the Wyandanch Club, the Auto of America Club of New York, the Cosmos Club of Washington, D. C., and the Royal Automobile Club of London.

Dorr died on June 29, 1962, at Gaylord Hospital in Wallingford, Connecticut.

== Awards and legacy ==
Dorr received seven honorary degrees throughout his lifetime. He received an honorary Masters of Engineering in 1914 and an honorary Doctor of Engineering in 1927 from Rutgers University. In 1940, he received honorary Doctor of Engineering degrees from both the South Dakota School of Mines and the Michigan College of Mining and Technology. In 1943, he received an honorary Doctor of Science degree from Columbia University. In 1956, he received an honorary Doctor of Engineering degree from the Colorado School of Mines. In 1960, he received an honorary Doctor of Engineering degree from the Polytechnic Institute of Brooklyn.

In 1916, Dorr received the John Scott Medal from the Franklin Institute. He received the Chemical Industry Medal in 1938 and the Perkin Medal by the Society of Chemical Industry in 1941. In 1949, the Chemical Engineering Magazine wrote that Dorr's inventions were "probably greater than those of any other chemical and metallurgical engineer of our times".
