= Evan J. Crane =

American chemist

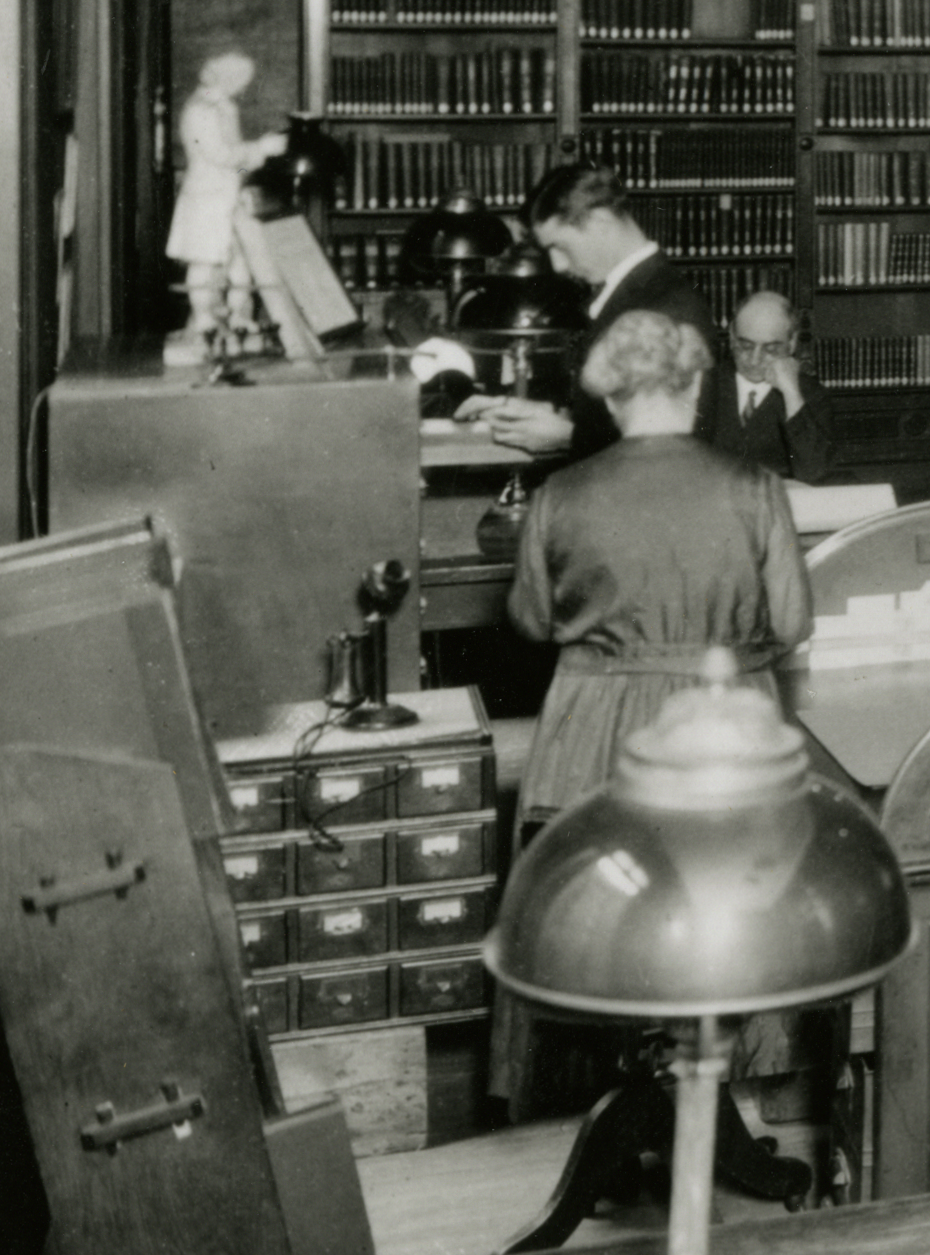
- Evan J. Crane (searching in a library catalog) with Austin M. Patterson (sitting) and librarian Emily J. Fell (from behind), c.1917-1923
- Born: February 14, 1889
- Died: December 30, 1966 (aged 77); Columbus, Ohio
- Occupation: chemist
- Known for: editor of Chemical Abstracts

Evan Jay Crane (February 14, 1889 – December 30, 1966) was an American chemist and the editor of Chemical Abstracts 1915–1958.

He graduated from Ohio State University in 1911, and received an Honorary D.Sc. there in 1938.

Crane received the Chemical Industry Medal in 1937. In 1951 he was awarded the Priestley Medal, the highest honour of the American Chemical Society, and in 1953 the Austin M. Patterson Award.

In 1958, at the 134th national meeting of the American Chemical Society, Crane was presented with a commemorative scroll from the ACS Division of Chemical Literature, worded as follows:

For Outstanding Contributions to Chemical Literature:

1: His superlative long-time editing of the world's outstanding abstracts journal, Chemical Abstracts;
2: His senior authorship of the classic book, A Guide to the Literature of Chemistry;
3: His many contributions to the development of chemical nomenclature;
4: His pioneering contributions during formation of the Division of Chemical Literature, culminating in his service as the Division's first elected Chairman.

== Publications ==
- A Guide to the Literature of Chemistry, by E. J. Crane and Austin M. Patterson (Wiley, 1927) (2nd edition: 1957, with Eleanor B. Marr)
