= Irving S. Shapiro =

American lawyer (1916–2001)

Irving Shapiro
- Born: Irving Saul Shapiro; July 15, 1916; Minneapolis, Minneapolis, U.S.
- Died: September 13, 2001 (aged 85); Wilmington, Delaware, U.S.
- Education: University of Minnesota, Twin Cities (BS, LLB)

Irving Saul Shapiro (July 15, 1916 – September 13, 2001) was an American lawyer and businessman, best known for being the first lawyer to become CEO of DuPont. Shapiro served as DuPont chairman from December 1973 to 1981. In 1987, he took over leadership of the Howard Hughes Medical Institute.

== Biography ==
Born in Minneapolis, Minnesota, Shapiro was the son of Lithuanian Jewish immigrants. His father was a dry cleaner and tailor. He was a graduate of the University of Minnesota Law School. He started his career as a government lawyer. In 1951, Shapiro joined E.I. du Pont de Nemours & Company working in their legal department. He worked his way up to the top of the company eventually serving as chairman and chief executive officer from 1973 to 1981. He was a member of both the American Academy of Arts and Sciences and the American Philosophical Society.

== Publications ==
- America's Third Revolution: Public Interest and the Private Role with Carl B. Kaufmann (1984)
