= Chemical Pioneer Award =

The Chemical Pioneer Award, established in 1966, is awarded by the American Institute of Chemists to recognize chemists or chemical engineers who have made outstanding contributions to advances in chemistry or the chemical profession.

== Recent recipients ==
Source: AIC

- 2022 Alison Butler, Chi-Huey Wong
- 2021 Benjamin Cravatt, Veronica Vaida, Jonathan L. Sessler
- 2020 No award
- 2019 William H. Starnes, Jr., Peng Chen, Richard B. Kaner
- 2018 Kenneth S. Suslick (University of Illinois at Urbana-Champaign); Vicki H. Grassian (UC San Diego); Mercouri Kanatzidis (Northwestern University)
- 2017 Paul A. Craig (Rochester Institute of Technology); Jeffrey W. Kelly (Scripps Research Institute); Marek W. Urban (Clemson University)
- 2016 Rebecca L. Cann (University of Hawaii at Manoa); Donna Blackmond (The Scripps Research Institute); Michael Wasielewski (Northwestern University)
- 2015 No award
- 2014 Anthony Cheetham (University of Cambridge, England); Ann M. Valentine (Temple University); Robert Langer (Massachusetts Institute of Technology)
- 2013 Henry F. Schaefer, III (University of Georgia); Thomas R. Tritton (Chemical Heritage Foundation)
- 2012 Robert Lochhead; Helen Free
- 2011 James Christner
- 2010 Sossina M. Haile (Caltech)
- 2009 Keith Carron (University of Wyoming); Debashis Mukherjee (IACS)
- 2008 E. Gerald Meyer (University of Wyoming); Barnaby Munson (University of Delaware)
- 2007 Magid Abou-Gharbia; Dennis Y-M Lo; Alan G. Marshall (Florida State University)
- 2006 Glenn Crosby; David Devraj Kumar (Florida Atlantic University)
- 2005 Bassam Shakhashiri; Steven L. Suib; C.N.R. Rao
- 2004 Keki H. Gharda; Eric Jacobsen; Michael Pirrung
- 2002 Gerard Jaouen; Julius Rebek
- 2000 Richard A. Adams; Robert G. Bergman; Larry Dahl; Wilfried Mortier; Kenner Rice

== Selected earlier recipients ==
- 1999 No award
- 1998 John E. Bercaw; Stephen J. Benkovic; Albert Meyers
- 1997 Jerrold Meinwald
- 1996 K.C. Nicolaou; Fred McLafferty
- 1995 Gabor Somorjai; Owen Webster
- 1994 Norman L. Allinger; M. Frederick Hawthorne; John D. Roberts
- 1993 Derek H. R. Barton; Bruce Merrifield; George Andrew Olah
- 1992 Gilbert Stork; Fred Basolo; Ralph F. Hirschmann
- 1991 Michel Boudart; Edith M. Flanigen; Herbert S. Gutowsky; Jack Halpern
- 1990 Michael J. S. Dewar
- 1989 Herman S. Bloch; Harry R. Allcock; David R. Bryant
- 1988 K. Barry Sharpless; John H. Sinfelt
- 1987 Herbert S. Eleuterio
- 1986 Howard Zimmerman
- 1985 Otto Vogl
- 1984 Alan MacDiarmid; Isabella Karle
- 1983 Harry G. Drickamer; William S. Knowles; Barry M. Trost
- 1981 Elias James Corey
- 1980 Paul H. Emmett; Stephanie Kwolek
- 1979 Paul Harteck; Barnett Rosenberg; Leo Sternbach; Alejandro Zaffaroni
- 1977 Donald F. Othmer
- 1976 Edwin T. Mertz
- 1975 Herbert C. Brown; Rachel Fuller Brown; Elizabeth Lee Hazen; Linus C. Pauling
- 1973 Melvin A. Cook; Paul J. Flory; Carl Djerassi
- 1972 Herman Francis Mark; Lewis Sarett
- 1970 Tracy Hall; William J. Sparks
- 1969 Roy J. Plunkett; Harold C. Urey
- 1968 Glenn T. Seaborg; Max Tishler
- 1966 Eugene G. Rochow, Charles C. Price

== See also ==
- List of chemistry awards
