= Henry Granger Knight =

American chemist

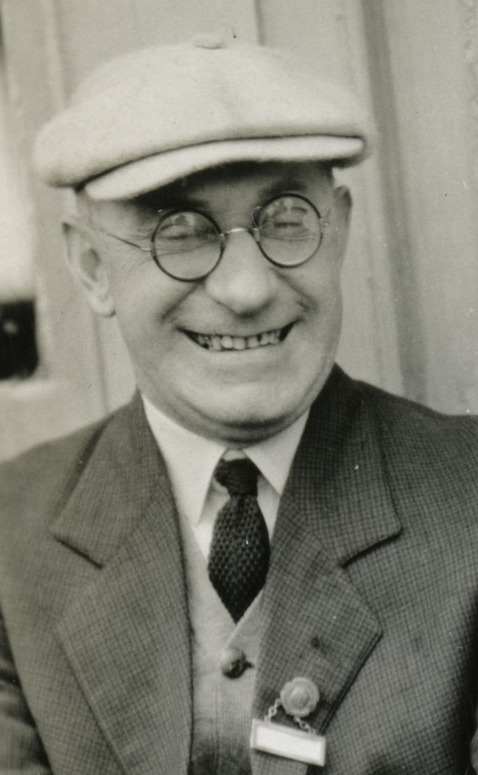
- Knight in 1927
- Born: July 21, 1878; Bennington, Kansas
- Died: July 13, 1942 (aged 63); Washington, D.C.
- Education: University of Illinois; University of Washington
- Scientific career
- Fields: Chemistry
- Thesis: Acidity and acidimetry of soils (1917)

Henry Granger Knight (1878–1942) was an American chemist and soil scientist who served as chief of the Bureau of Chemistry and Soils, U.S. Department of Agriculture, and as president of the American Institute of Chemists. He formerly served as dean of agriculture at the University of Wyoming, Oklahoma Agricultural College, and West Virginia University.

== Early life and education ==
Henry Granger Knight, was born July 21, 1878, in Bennington, Kansas, to parents Edwin Richard and Elva Maude (Edwards) Knight. Edwin Knight, a marine engineer, was a native of Ohio and a descendant of one of the old families of that state of Irish lineage. Elva Knight was a daughter of pioneer settlers of Iowa and of Kansas, of English and Irish descent. Henry was one of three children.

Knight attended school in Minneapolis, Kansas and later Washington state, attending high school in Port Townsend and enrolling in the University of Washington, where he earned a Bachelor of Art's degree in 1902. He studied chemistry at the University of Chicago from 1903 to 1904 before earning a Master of Arts from University of Washington in 1904. He earned a PhD from the University of Illinois in 1917.

== Career ==
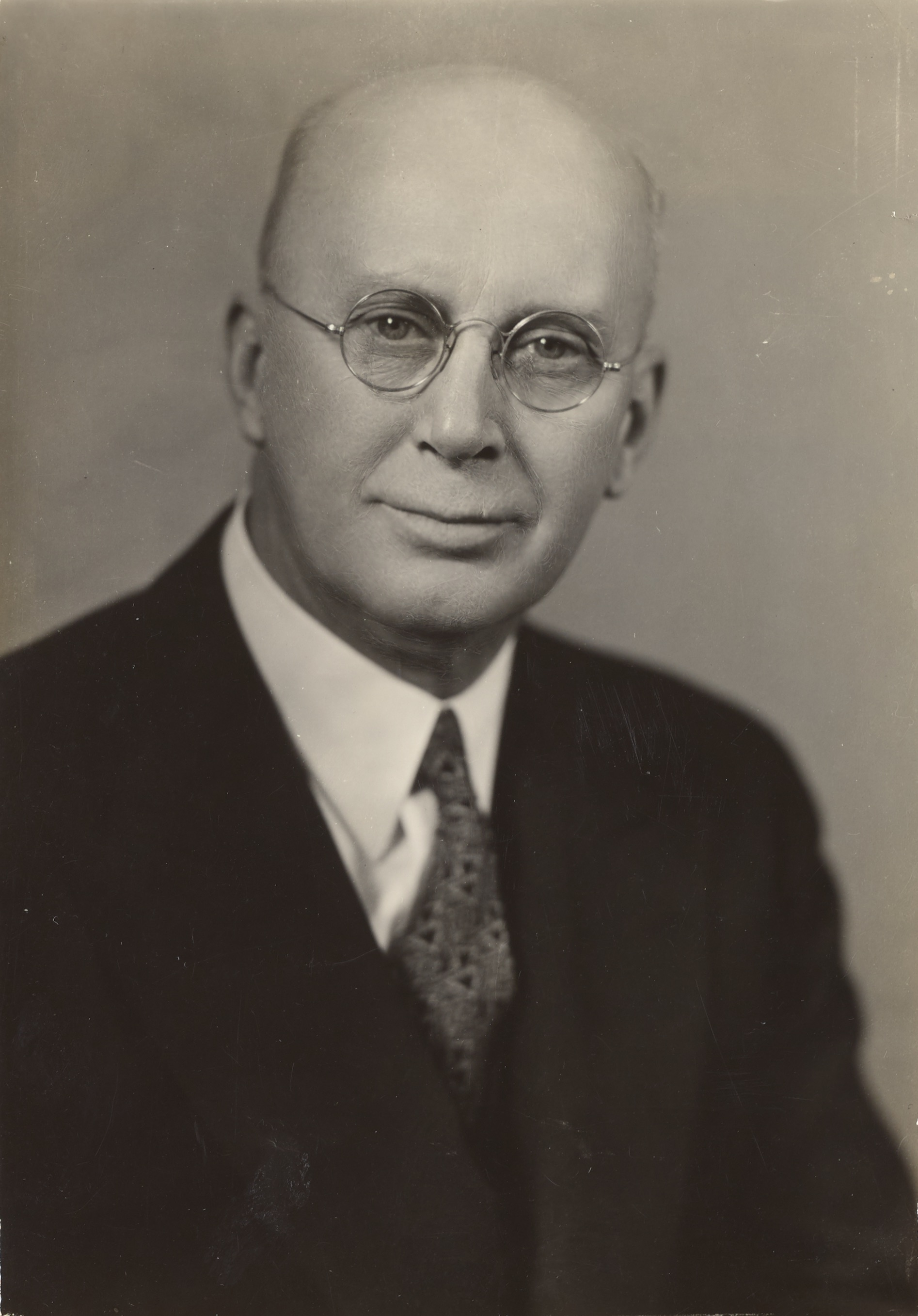
Henry G. Knight, Bureau of Chemistry and Soils, U.S. Government

Knight worked as an assistant in the chemistry department at University of Washington (190–01) and as instructor for the 1901–02 school year. From 1904 to 1910 he was professor of chemistry at the University of Wyoming, where he also served as state chemist. From 1910 to 1918 he held deanship of the College of Agriculture. From 1918 to 1921 he was dean and director of the Oklahoma Agricultural College at Stillwater (now Oklahoma State University College of Agricultural Sciences and Natural Resources), and from 1922 to 1927 served as director of the experiment station at West Virginia University, where he also served as dean of the agricultural college from 1926 to 1927.

In 1927, Knight became head of the Bureau of Chemistry and Soils of the United States Department of Agriculture. He was a fellow and president (1933–1935) of the American Institute of Chemists, which awarded him its Gold Medal in 1941.

== Personal life ==
On July 28, 1905, Knight was married to Nellie Elizabeth Dryden of Kansas. Their son, Richard Dryden, was born July 7, 1909. In Wyoming he belonged to the First Methodist Episcopal Church of Laramie and the Masonic fraternity. In politics he was a republican and in 1913 and 1914 was president of the Commercial Club of Laramie.
