= Lewis Hastings Sarett =

American organic chemist (1917–1999)

- Born: December 22, 1917; Champaign, Illinois
- Died: November 29, 1999 (aged 81); Viola, Idaho
- Occupation: Organic chemist
- Spouse(s): Mary Adams Barrie (m. March 1, 1944 - div. June 28, 1969); Pamela Thorp
- Children: Mary Nicole and Katharine Wendy (1st wife); Will H. and Renee M. (2nd wife)

Lewis Hastings Sarett (December 22, 1917 – November 29, 1999) was an American organic chemist. While serving as a research scientist at Merck & Co., Inc., he synthesized cortisone.

== Biography ==
He was born in Champaign, Illinois. His father was Lew Sarett, a renowned Jewish poet and professor and an uncle of former Secretary of Defense Donald Rumsfeld. He lived in Laona, Wisconsin, for a time and then attended high school in Highland Park, Illinois. He received a Bachelor of Science from Northwestern University in 1939, graduating in the honors society Phi Beta Kappa and got a doctorate from Princeton University.

He worked for Merck & Co. for 38 years retiring in 1982. He invented a Process of Treating Pregnene Compounds Cortisone, Patent Number 2,462,133.

Named after him is the Sarett Oxidation which is the oxidation of an alcohol to a ketone or an aldehyde using chromic oxide and pyridine. Primary alcohols will be oxidised to aldehydes and not carboxylic acids.

== Honors and awards ==
- 1964 Scheele Award
- 1972 Chemical Pioneer Award from the American Institute of Chemists
- 1975 National Medal of Science
- 1976 Perkin Medal
- 1980 Inducted into the National Inventors Hall of Fame
- 1980 Awarded the IRI Medal from the Industrial Research Institute for his contributions to technology leadership
- 1981 American Institute of Chemists Gold Medal
