= Bassam Shakhashiri =

American chemist

Bassam Z. Shakhashiri
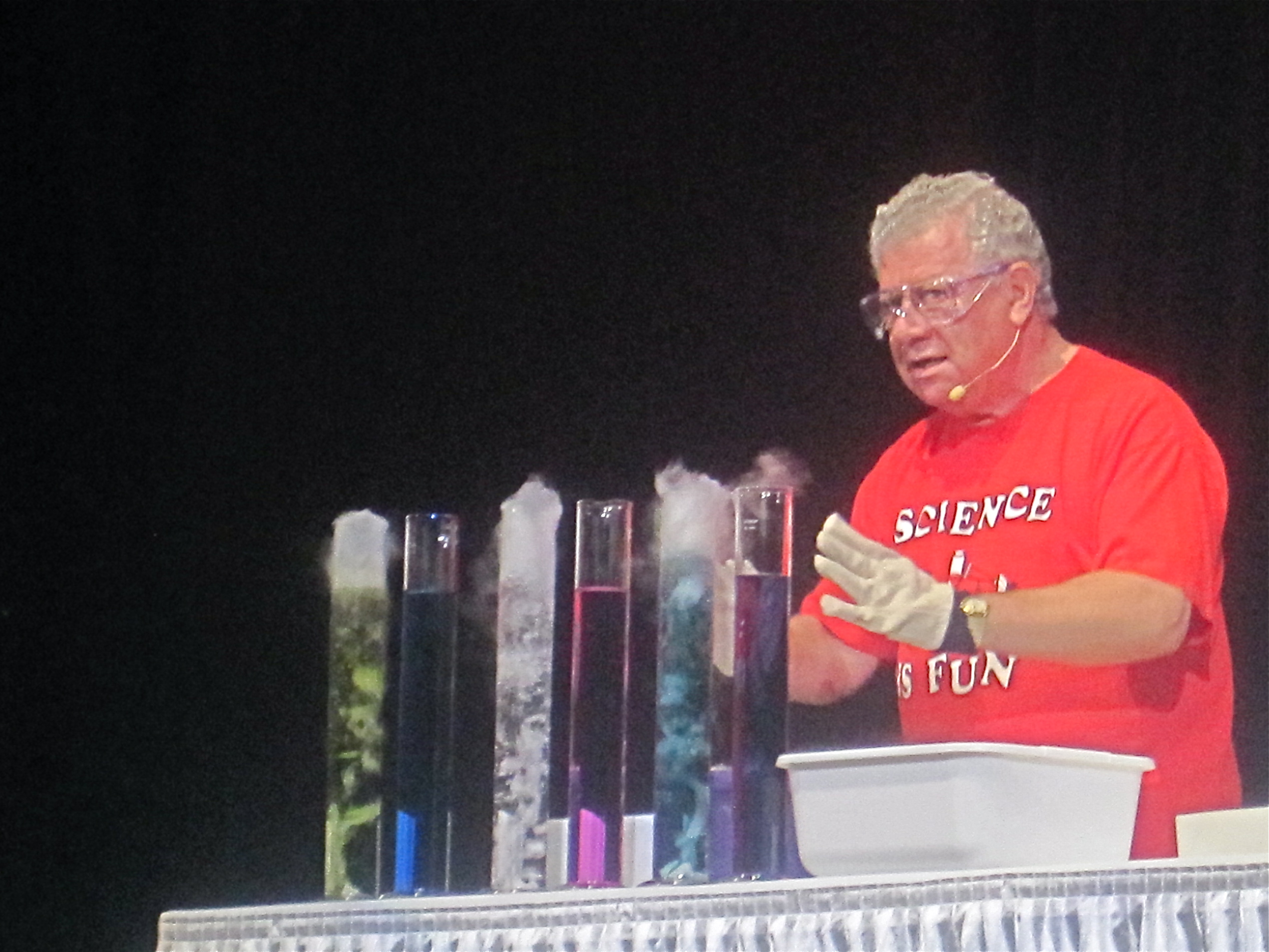
- Shakhashiri presenting "Science is Fun" at the 2011 National Science Olympiad.
- Born: 1939 (age 86–87); Lebanon
- Education: Boston University; University of Maryland
- Scientific career
- Fields: Chemistry
- Workplaces: University of Wisconsin-Madison
- Website: scifun.org

Bassam Z. Shakhashiri (born 1939, in Lebanon) is an emeritus professor of chemistry at the University of Wisconsin-Madison, where he was the first holder of the William T. Evjue Distinguished Chair for the Wisconsin Idea. An active advocate for science education, he is the author of multiple books of chemical demonstrations. He was the 2012 president of the American Chemical Society and has received numerous awards and honors.

== Education ==
Shakhashiri was born in 1939 in Lebanon to Zekin A. Shakhashiri of the American University of Beirut and Adma N. Shakhashiri. The family moved to the United States in 1957. Shakhashiri attended Boston University, receiving his A.B. degree in 1960, and then earned an M.Sc. (1964) and Ph.D. (1968) in chemistry at the University of Maryland. He accepted a postdoctoral position under Gilbert P. Haight, Jr., at the University of Illinois at Urbana–Champaign, and taught there for two years as a junior faculty member. In 1970 Professor Shakhashiri joined the faculty of the University of Wisconsin-Madison, where he held the William T. Evjue Distinguished Chair until his retirement in 2021. He has been a member of the American Chemical Society since 1962.

== Science education ==
External videos
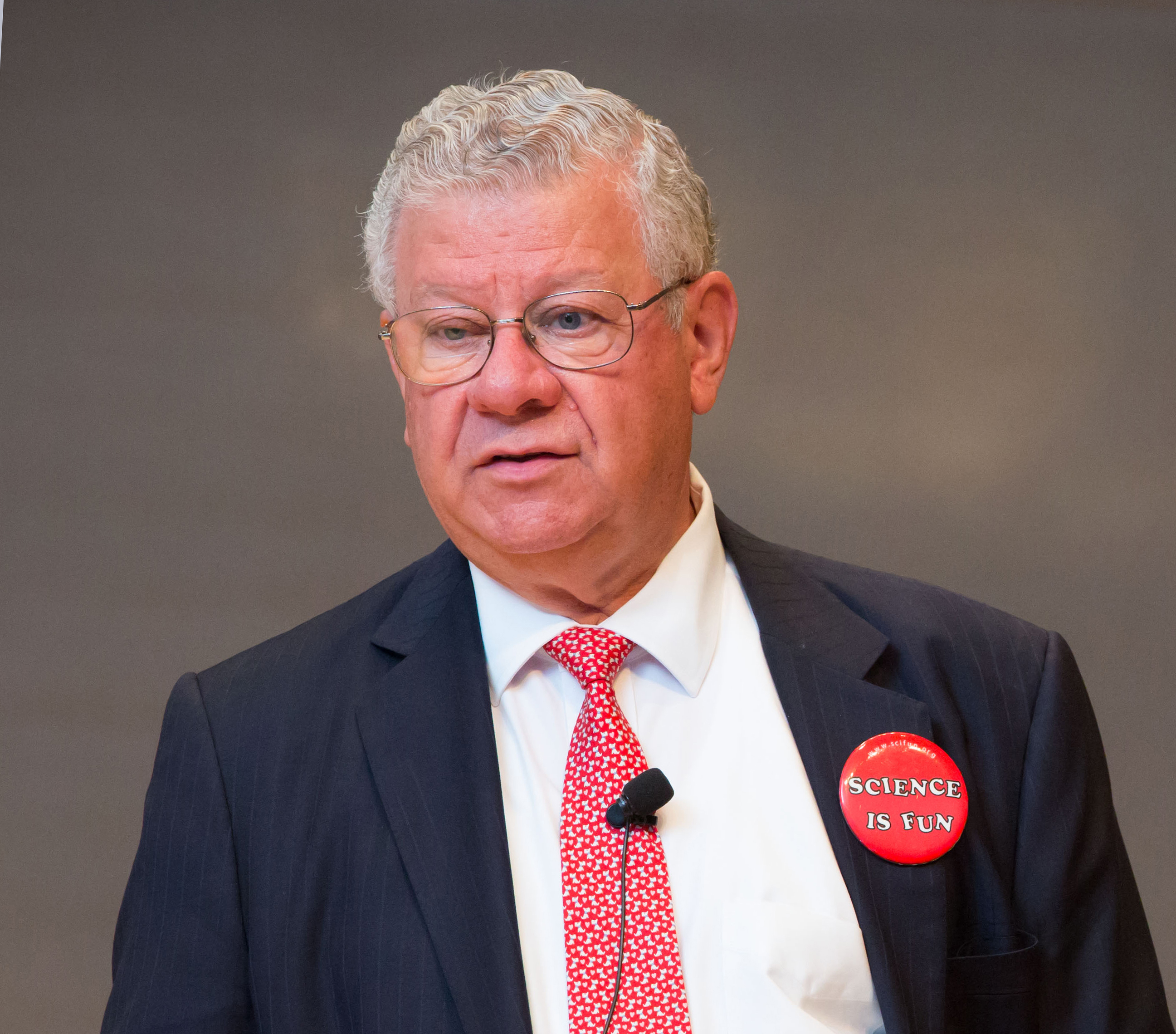
- Bassam Shakhashiri: The Rewards and Responsibilities of Freedom, Chemical Heritage Foundation
- Spellbound Episode 3—A Yellow Sweater: Bassam Shakhashiri, Ph.D., ACSVideoTheater
- Once Upon a Christmas Cheery, WISLscifun

Shakhashiri has given more than 1400 invited lectures and presentations around the world. Shakhashiri is a strong advocate for public education and programs that inform the public about scientific research, creating an "educated citizenry". He helped to found the Wisconsin Initiative for Science Literacy.

“Science literacy enlightens and enables people to make informed choices, to be skeptical and to reject shams, quackery, unproven conjecture and to avoid being bamboozled into making foolish decisions where matters of science and technology are concerned. Science literacy is for everyone – chemists, artists, humanists, all professionals, the general public, youth and adults alike.”

— Mission statement of the Wisconsin Initiative for Science Literacy

Shakhashiri has spent much of his career celebrating the fun of science by giving public demonstrations at schools, fairs and on television. At UW-Madison, he directs the Wisconsin Initiative for Science Literacy (WISL), a coalition of scientists and graduate students committed to innovating science education and engagement. The Science Is Fun! presentations at community settings such as farmers' markets, shopping malls, schools, and colleges have reached tens of thousands of students, teachers, and parents throughout Wisconsin. His annual Christmas show, "Once Upon a Christmas Cheery in the Lab of Shakhashiri," inspired by lectures of 19th century scientist Michael Faraday, ran for 50 years, and has been viewed by as many as 1,400 people in one year. The institute also sponsors a scholarship for graduate students in chemistry who include a chapter in their dissertation that describes their scholarly research for a general audience.

Shakhashiri has published several books of chemistry demonstrations, including Manual for Laboratory Investigations in General Chemistry; Workbook for General Chemistry; and Chemical Demonstrations: A Handbook for Teachers of Chemistry, Volumes 1, 2, 3, 4 and 5. His books, television broadcasts, and website have provided the source material for presentations given by hundreds of teachers during National Chemistry Week, as well as regular demonstrations by many teachers throughout the year. Chemical Demonstrations has been applauded as "a series without peer", for its "wealth of detail", "copiously illustrated, meticulously documented, and well-planned."

In 1996-1997 Shakhashiri chaired two working groups that reviewed the Wisconsin Science and Math Standards.

== National Science Foundation ==
Shakhashiri served as assistant director of the National Science Foundation for Science and Engineering Education from 1984 to 1990. In that position he obtained a four-fold budget increase for science education over a five-year period, and was credited widely with revitalizing science education programs at NSF. However, he was also anonymously criticized for having a "confrontational" style, overly personalizing policy campaigns, and introducing a political element into the grant award process. In 1990 NSF Director Erich Bloch removed Shakhashiri from his post, replacing him with Luther Williams, a move that was both applauded and protested.

== American Chemical Society President ==
He was elected President-Elect of the American Chemical Society in 2011 and became president in January 2012. One of his initiatives while president was to create a year-long Commission on Graduate Education in the Chemical Sciences, whose report, Advancing Graduate Education in the Chemical Sciences, recommended better preparation of Ph.D. candidates for employment, teaching communication skills for engagement in a global workplace, and inclusion of women and students from underrepresented populations.

Shakhashiri has also spoken about changes in scientific practice, in particular the ways in which boundaries between chemistry and biology are blurring as scientists learn more in those fields. More recently, he has called for active scientific discourse on climate change and other significant societal issues.

== Awards and honors ==
Shakhashiri's awards and honors include the following:

- 1969, 1970 - Outstanding Lecturer of the Year in General Chemistry, University of Illinois
- 1977 - Kiekhofer Distinguished Teaching Award, University of Wisconsin-Madison
- 1979 - Manufacturing Chemists Association Catalyst Award
- 1982 - Ron Gibbs Award, Wisconsin Society of Science Teachers for "outstanding contributions to science education at the local, regional, national, and international levels."
- 1983 - James Flack Norris Award for Outstanding Achievement in the Teaching of Chemistry, Northeastern Section, American Chemical Society
- 1986 - George C. Pimentel Award in Chemical Education, American Chemical Society
- 2002 - Award for Public Understanding of Science and Technology, American Association for the Advancement of Science (AAAS) for "tireless efforts to communicate science to the general public, and especially children."
- 2005 - Chemical Pioneer Award, American Institute of Chemists
- 2005 - Helen M. Free Award for Public Outreach, American Chemical Society, for "lifelong accomplishments and for explaining and demonstrating science with charisma and passion"
- 2007 - National Science Board Public Service Award, for "extraordinary contributions to promote science literacy and cultivate the intellectual and emotional links between science and the arts for the public"
- 2008 - David Emerson Science Advocacy Medal, University of Nevada, Las Vegas, for "distinguished, sustained, and lasting contributions in the development of the sciences."
- 2013 - Carl Sagan Award for Public Understanding of Science, Council of Scientific Society Presidents
- 2018 - James T. Grady-James H. Stack Award for Interpreting Chemistry

== Selected works ==
- "Exhortation for Good Teaching". J. Chem. Educ., 63, 777 (1986).
- Shakhashiri, B.Z., Ucko, D.A. and Schreiner, R. "An Exhibition of Everyday Chemistry: Communicating Chemistry to the Public". J. Chem. Educ., 63, 1081 (1986).
- Chemical Demonstrations: A Handbook for Teachers of Chemistry. Vol. 1 (1983); Vol. 2 (1985); Vol. 3 (1989); Vol. 4 (1992); Vol. 5 (2011), Madison: University of Wisconsin Press.
- "Exhortations for Enhancing the Quality of Science and Technology Education". Materials Research Society Bulletin, p. 7 (July 1992).
- "Science is Fun: Flames, Fog and Fountains" and "Science is Fun: Collapsing Cans and Glowing Liquids". Public Broadcasting System and Wisconsin Public Television (1992).
- "Science is Fun: Flashing Cash and Instant Ice Cream" and "Science is Fun: Silver Trees and Orange Tornadoes". Public Broadcasting System and Wisconsin Public Television (1995).
- "Science is Fun: Sound and Music" and "Science is Fun: Bubbles in the Kitchen". Public Broadcasting System and Wisconsin Public Television (1997).
- "Once Upon A Christmas Cheery In The Lab Of Shakhashiri". Public Broadcasting System and Wisconsin Public Television (1991, 1992, 1993, 1994, 1996, 1997, 1998, 1999).
- "Science is Fun: Chem Time and Physics Fun" and "Science is Fun: Colored Flames and Glowing Liquids". Public Broadcasting System and Wisconsin Public Television (2000).
