= Howard Zimmerman =

American academic

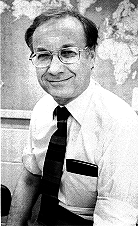
- Zimmerman in 2000
- Born: Howard E. Zimmerman; July 5, 1926; New York City, New York
- Died: February 12, 2012 (aged 85); Madison, Wisconsin
- Education: Yale University
- Occupations: Professor of chemistry, University of Wisconsin–Madison
- Website: chem.wisc.edu

Howard E. Zimmerman (July 5, 1926 – February 12, 2012) was a professor of chemistry at the University of Wisconsin–Madison. He was elected to the National Academy of Sciences in 1980 and the recipient of the 1986 American Institute of Chemists Chemical Pioneer Award.

== Biography ==
Howard E. Zimmerman was a native of Connecticut. During World War II, he served in the U.S. Armored Corps in Europe where he was a tank gunner. His final rank was technical sergeant. He obtained a B. S. in Chemistry in 1950 and a Ph.D. in 1953 both from Yale University. He was a Postdoctoral Research Fellow with a National Research Council fellowship from 1953 to 1954 working with R. B. Woodward (Harvard). From 1954 to 1960 he was assistant professor at Northwestern University. Beginning in 1960 he was Associate Professor and then Professor at the University of Wisconsin, and from 1990 he was Hilldale and A. C. Cope Professor of Chemistry. His publications number over 285 (including 11 chapters).

Zimmerman gave ACS Short Courses on organic quantum chemistry and molecular orbital theory. He authored a 1975 textbook entitled Quantum Mechanics for Organic Chemists. Zimmerman was the organizer of the 1972 IUPAC Photochemistry Symposium (Baden-Baden) and of five Pacifichem Symposia – the last being Pacifichem 2010.

== Honors ==
- Phi Beta Kappa
- Sigma Xi
- 1950 The Chittenden Award given to the top B.S. graduate in the Yale class of 1950
- 1971 The first Northeast ACS Award for Photochemistry
- 1976 The ACS James Flack Norris Award in Physical Organic Chemistry
- 1980 The Halpern Award of the New York Academy of Sciences
- 1980 Election to the National Academy of Sciences
- 1986 Recipient of the American Institute of Chemists Chemical Pioneer Award
- 1988 A Senior Alexander von Humboldt Award
- 1990 Hilldale Award in the Physical Sciences from the University of Wisconsin
- 1991 Arthur C. Cope Scholar Award of the ACS
- 2006 IUPAC Porter Medal for Photochemical Research

== Selected bibliography ==
- "The Stereochemistry of the Ketonization Reaction of Enols," Zimmerman, H. E. J. Org. Chem., 1955, 20, 549-557. ISSN 0022-3263
- "The Stereochemistry of the Ivanov and Reformatsky Reactions. I," Zimmerman, H. E.; Traxler, M. D. J. Am. Chem. Soc., 1957, 79, 1920-1923. ISSN 0002-7863
- "The Photochemical Rearrangement of 4,4-Diphenylcyclohexadienone. Paper I on a General Theory of Photochemical Reactions," Zimmerman, H. E.; Schuster, D. I. J. Am. Chem. Soc., 1961, 83, 4486-4487. ISSN 0002-7863
- "On Molecular Orbital Correlation Diagrams, the Occurrence of Möbius Systems in Cyclization Reactions, and Factors Controlling Ground and Excited State Reactions. I," Zimmerman, H. E. J. Am. Chem. Soc., 1966, 88, 1564-1565. ISSN 0002-7863
- "Photochemical Migratory Aptitudes in Cyclohexenones. Mechanistic and Exploratory Organic Photochemistry. XXIII," Zimmerman, H. E.; Rieke, R. D.; Scheffer, J. R. J. Am. Chem. Soc., 1967, 89, 2033-2047. ISSN 0002-7863
- "The Di-π-Methane Rearrangement. Interaction of Electronically Excited Vinyl Chromophores. Zimmerman, H. E.; Mariano, P. S. J. Am. Chem. Soc., 1969, 91, 1718-1727. ISSN 0002-7863
- "The Barrelene to Semibullvalene Transformation. Correlation of Excited State Potential Energy Surfaces With Reactivity. Mechanistic and Exploratory Organic Photochemistry. XLIV," Zimmerman, H. E.; Binkley, R. W.; Givens, R. S.; Sherwin, M. A.; Grunewald, G. L.; J. Am. Chem. Soc., 1969, 91, 3316-3323. ISSN 0002-7863 .
- "The Möbius-Hückel Concept in Organic Chemistry. Application to Organic Molecules and Reactions," Zimmerman, H. E. Acc. Chem. Res., 1971, 4, 272-280. ISSN 0001-4842
- "Quantum Mechanics for Organic Chemists," Zimmerman, H. E. Academic Press, New York, 1975. ISBN 0-12-781650-X
- "Some Theoretical Aspects of Organic Photochemistry," Zimmerman, H. E. Accts. of Chem. Research, 1982, 10, 312-317. ISSN 0001-4842
- "Kinetic Protonation of Enols, Enolates and Analogs; The Stereochemistry of Ketonization," Zimmerman, H. E.. Accounts of Chem. Res.', 1987, 20, 263-268. ISSN 0001-4842
- "Regioselectivity of the Birch Reduction", Zimmerman, H. E.; Wang, P. A., J. Am. Chem. Soc., 1993, 115, 2205-2216. ISSN 0002-7863
- "The Meta Effect in Organic Photochemistry; Mechanistic and Exploratory Organic Photochemistry", Zimmerman, H. E., J. Am. Chem. Soc. 1995, 117, 8988-8991. ISSN 0002-7863
- "Synthetic Aspects of the Di-π-methane Rearrangement", Zimmerman, H. E.; Armesto, D. Chem. Revs, 1996, 96, 3065-3112. ISSN 0009-2665
- "Energy Distribution and Redistribution and Chemical Reactivity. The Generalized Delta Overlap-Density Method for Ground State and Electron Transfer Reactions; A new Quantitative Counterpart of Electron Pushing”, Zimmerman, H. E.; Alabugin, I. V. J. Am. Chem. Soc. 2001, 121, 2265-2270 ISSN 0002-7863
- “Inter and Intramolecular Stereoselective Protonation of Enols”, Zimmerman, H. E.; Wang, P., J. Org. Chem. 2002, 69, 9216-9226. ISSN 0022-3263
- "Triplet Photochemistry of Vinyl Cyclopropenes; Mechanistic and Exploratory Organic Photochemistry", Zimmerman, H. E., J Org. Chem. 2009, 73, 1247-1251. ISSN 0022-3263.
