= American Institute of Chemists Gold Medal =

Award

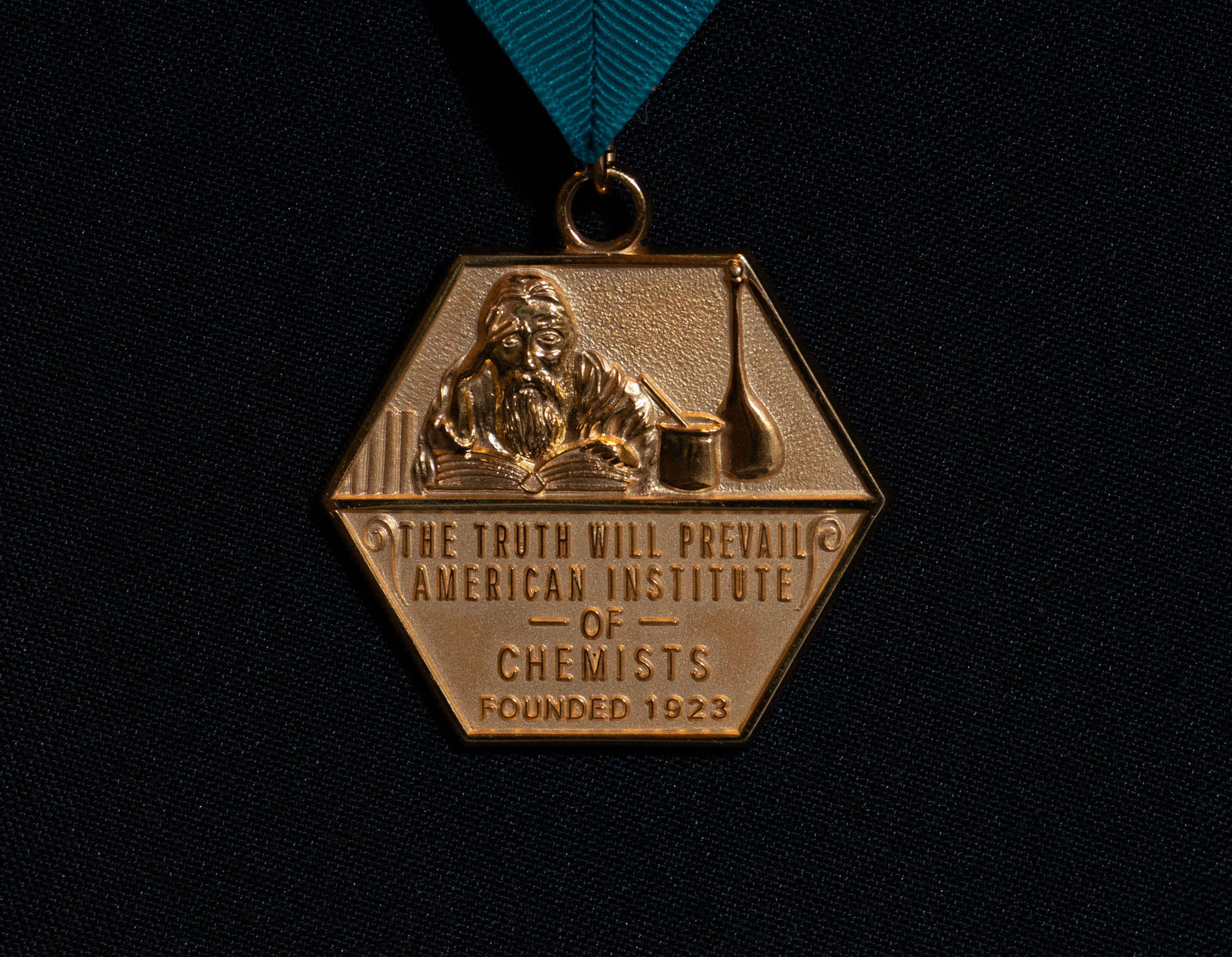
- Awarded for: Given annually "to a person who has stimulated activities of service to the science of chemistry or the profession of chemist or chemical engineer in the United States of America."
- Date: 1926
- Country: U.S.A.
- Presented by: American Institute of Chemists
- Website: www.theaic.org/awards_goldmedal.html

The American Institute of Chemists Gold Medal is the highest award of the American Institute of Chemists and has been awarded since 1926.

It is presented annually to a person who has most encouraged the science of chemistry or the profession of chemist or chemical engineer in the United States of America, giving "exemplary service".

== Medal recipients ==
The following people have received the AIC Gold Medal:

- 1926 Dr. William Blum
- 1927 Dr. Lafayette B. Mendel
- 1929 Mr. and Mrs. Francis P. Garvan
- 1930 Mr. George Eastman
- 1931 Mr. Andrew W. Mellon & Mr. Richard B. Mellon
- 1932 Dr. Charles H. Herty
- 1933 Dr. Henry C. Sherman
- 1934 Dr. James Bryant Conant
- 1935 Rev. Dr. Julius Nieuwland
- 1936 Dr. Marston Taylor Bogert
- 1937 Dr. James F. Norris
- 1938 Dr. Frederick G. Cottrell
- 1940 Dr. Gustav Egloff
- 1941 Dr. Henry G. Knight
- 1942 Dr. William Lloyd Evans
- 1943 Dr. Walter S. Landis
- 1944 Dr. Willard H. Dow
- 1945 John W. Thomas
- 1946 Mr. Robert Price Russell
- 1947 Dr. Moses Leverock Crossley
- 1948 Dr. Charles A. Thomas
- 1949 Dr. Warren K. Lewis
- 1950 Dr. Walter J. Murphy
- 1951 Dr. Harry N. Holmes
- 1952 Dr. Fred J. Emmerich
- 1953 Dr. John Christian Warner
- 1954 Dr. William J. Sparks
- 1955 Dr. Carl S. Marvel
- 1956 Mr. Raymond Stevens
- 1957 Dr. Roy Newton
- 1958 Dr. Lawrence Flett
- 1959 Dr. Crawford H. Greenewalt
- 1960 Dr. Ernest H. Volwiler
- 1961 Dr. Alden H. Emery
- 1962 Dr. George W. Parks
- 1963 Dr. Ralph Connor
- 1964 Dr. Roger Adams
- 1965 Brig. Gen Edwin Cox
- 1966 Dr. John H. Nair
- 1967 Dr. Wayne E. Kuhn
- 1968 Dr. Orville E. May
- 1969 Dr. Henry B. Hass
- 1970 Dr. Willard F. Libby
- 1971 Dr. Emmett B. Carmichael
- 1972 Dr. Harold C. Urey
- 1973 Dr. Glenn T. Seaborg
- 1974 Dr. W. E. "Butch" Hanford
- 1975 Dr. William O. Baker
- 1976 Dr. Kenneth S. Pitzer
- 1977 Dr. Max Tishler
- 1978 Dr. Norman Hackerman
- 1979 Dr. Melvin Calvin
- 1980 Dr. Arthur M. Bueche
- 1981 Dr. Lewis Sarett
- 1982 Dr. Milton Harris
- 1983 Dr. Mary L. Good
- 1984 Dr. John H. Sinfelt
- 1985 Dr. Herbert C. Brown
- 1986 Dr. N. Bruce Hannay
- 1987 Dr. Arnold O. Beckman
- 1988 Dr. George C. Pimentel
- 1989 Dr. Elias J. Corey
- 1990 Dr. Harry B. Gray
- 1991 Dr. Bruce N. Ames
- 1992 Dr. Roy L. Whistler
- 1993 Dr. Fred Basolo
- 1994 Dr. Arthur Adamson
- 1995 Dr. George Parshall
- 1996 Dr. Harry Drickman
- 1997 Dr. Alfred Bader
- 1998 Dr. F. Albert Cotton
- 2000 Dr. Yie W. Chien
- 2002 Dr. Tobin Marks
- 2003 Dr. Ralph Hirschmann
- 2004 Dr. Carl Djerassi
- 2005 Mr. Robert L. McNeil, Jr.
- 2006 Dr. Roald Hoffmann
- 2007 Dr. George Whitesides
- 2008 Dr. Paul Berg
- 2009 Oliver Smithies
- 2010 Robert Grubbs
- 2011 Dudley Herschbach
- 2012 Elizabeth Blackburn
- 2013 John D. Roberts
- 2014 Ronald Breslow
- 2015 Jacqueline Barton
- 2016 Chad Mirkin
- 2017 Stephen J. Lippard
- 2018 E. Gerald Meyer
- 2019 Henry F. Schaefer III
- 2020 (no award was given)
- 2021 Peter J. Stang
- 2022 Brian M. Hoffman
- 2023 K. Barry Sharpless
- 2024 Peter G. Schultz
- 2025 Timothy M. Swager

== See also ==
- List of chemistry awards
