= E. Gerald Meyer =

Edmond Gerald Meyer
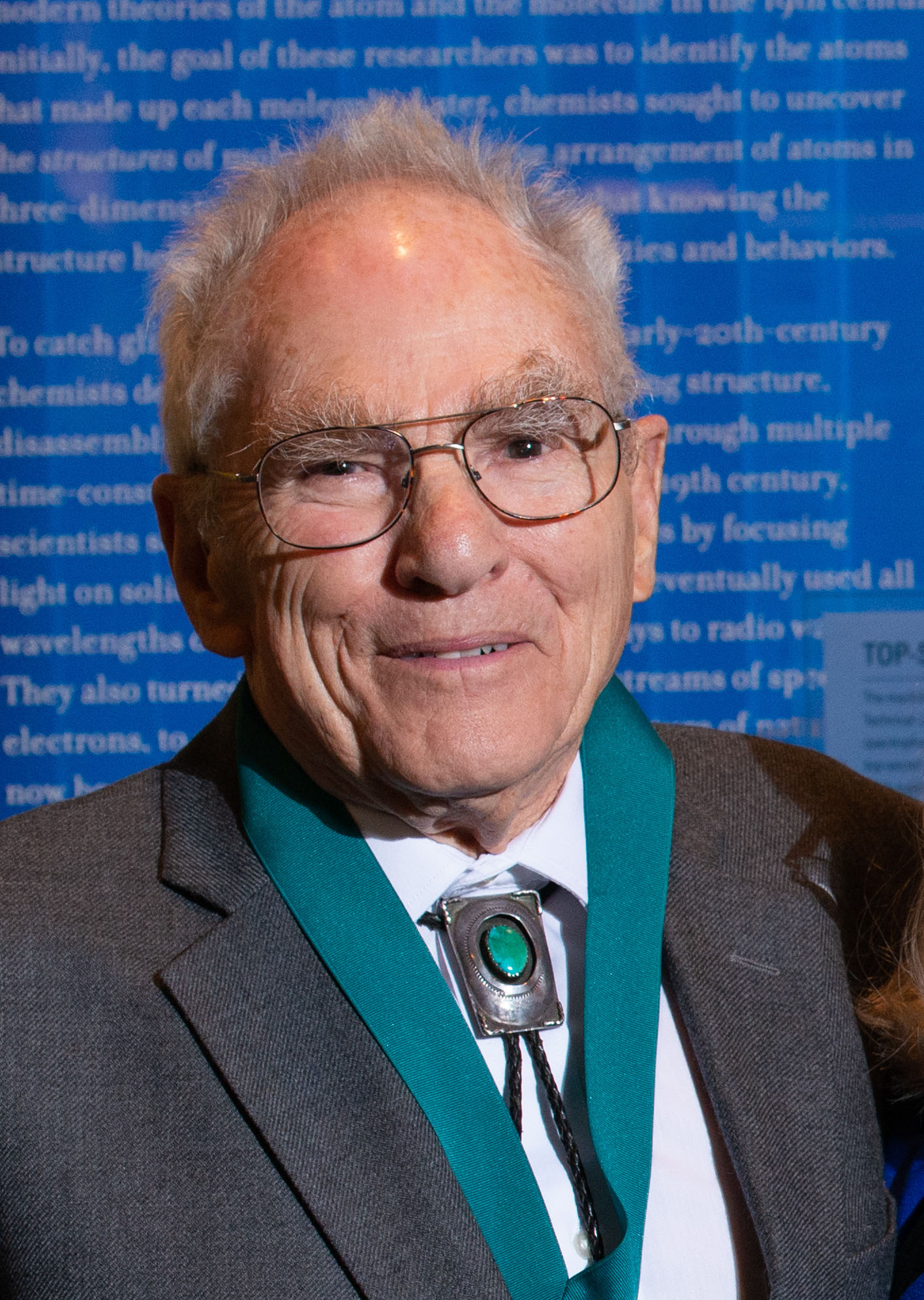
- E. Gerald Meyer, 2018
- Born: Edmond Gerald Meyer; November 2, 1919 (age 106); Albuquerque, New Mexico
- Awards: ACS Award for Volunteer Service, Chemical Pioneer Award, American Institute of Chemists Gold Medal

Edmond Gerald Meyer (born November 2, 1919) is emeritus professor of chemistry and former dean of the college of arts and sciences at the University of Wyoming. He is a past president of the American Institute of Chemists and an active member of the American Chemical Society, serving on the ACS National Council for 27 years.

Meyer is a recipient of the 2006 Award for Volunteer Service to the American Chemical Society, 2008 Chemical Pioneer Award and the American Institute of Chemists Gold Medal, awarded May 9, 2018. He was named a Fellow of the American Chemical Society in 2010. He turned 100 in November 2019.

== Early life ==
Meyer was born on November 2, 1919 in Albuquerque, New Mexico.

== Education ==
Meyer earned his B.S. (1940) and M.S. (1942) degrees at the Carnegie Institute of Technology (now Carnegie Mellon University). Meyer has worked for the U.S. Bureau of Mines and for the U.S. Naval Research Laboratory, where he was a naval officer during World War II. Following the war, he returned to university, receiving a Ph.D. at the University of New Mexico in 1950.

== Career ==
Meyer was a faculty member at the University of Albuquerque from 1950 to 1992. He was on the faculty of New Mexico Highlands University from 1952 to 1963, serving as head of the chemistry department from 1953-1963, and dean of graduate studies and research. November 13, 2009, was proclaimed Gerald Meyer Day by the New Mexico Highlands Board of Regents.

He co-authored Chemistry : A Survey of Principles (1963) with Galen W. Ewing. It was translated in Japanese.

In 1963 he accepted a position on the faculty of the University of Wyoming, where he was a professor, the dean of arts and sciences, and vice president for research (1976-2000). He formally retired as dean of arts and sciences and vice president of research as of 1990, but continued to do research as professor emeritus.

Meyer has been president and chief executive officer of a company for the development of green technologies for coal processing: Advanced Coal to Chemicals Technologies.

He has been active in the American Chemical Society at local, regional and national levels, and is a past president of the American Institute of Chemists.

== Personal life ==
Meyer has competed in at least three National Senior Olympics. He is an avid motorcyclist and rides a Harley Davidson motorcycle. He bought his first motorcycle, a 150cc kick-start Kawasaki, in 1963. He continued to ride into his 90s. He also is a prominent figure in the documentary Spirit of the Marathon, where he shares his journey within the sport of long distance running.

== See also ==
- List of centenarian masters track and field athletes
