= Magid Abou-Gharbia =

American pharmaceutical scientist

- Born: December 1, 1949 (age 76); Cairo, Egypt
- Education: University of Pennsylvania (Ph.d)
- Occupation: Laura H. Carnell Professor
- Spouse: Dr. Lamaat Shalaby
- Children: 3
- Scientific career
- Workplaces: Temple University School of Pharmacy

Magid Abou-Gharbia (born December 1, 1949) is an medicinal chemist and pharmaceutical researcher who has worked in both the pharmaceutical industry and academia. He is a Laura H. Carnell Professor of Pharmaceutical Sciences at the Temple University School of Pharmacy and was the founding director of the Moulder Center for Drug Discovery Research. Before joining Temple, he spent 26 years at Wyeth, where he held senior research and management positions in drug discovery. His research and leadership have been associated with the development of pharmaceutical compounds, including candidates that resulted in marketed drugs.

== Early life and education ==
Abou-Gharbia studied pharmacy at Cairo University, where he received a Bachelor of Science in Pharmacy in 1971 and a Master of Science in Pharmaceutical Sciences in 1974. He subsequently attended the University of Pennsylvania, receiving a Ph.D. in organic chemistry in 1979. He then completed an NIH postdoctoral fellowship at Temple University, School of Pharmacy and College of Science and Technology.

== Industrial and academic career ==
Abou-Gharbia joined Wyeth Research in 1982 and remained with the company for 26 years. He progressed through a series of research and management positions before becoming senior vice president and head of Chemical and Screening Sciences. In that role, he directed discovery chemistry and screening research involving scientists at several research sites in the United States and internationally. His work at Wyeth included medicinal chemistry and drug-discovery programs across multiple therapeutic areas.

During his tenure at Wyeth, Abou-Gharbia was involved in research programs that contributed to the discovery and development of drug candidates, including compounds that subsequently became marketed medicines. The American Chemical Society has specifically recognized his work connected with the discovery of Effexor and Torisel through its Heroes of Chemistry program.

In 2008, Abou-Gharbia joined the Temple University School of Pharmacy as a professor of pharmaceutical sciences and helped establish the Moulder Center for Drug Discovery Research. The center was formally dedicated in 2009 following a gift from Lonnie and Sharon Moulder. Abou-Gharbia served as its founding director from 2008 to 2020 and was also associate dean for research at the School of Pharmacy from 2009 to 2019. He was appointed Laura H. Carnell Professor in 2013.

Under his leadership, the Moulder Center developed multidisciplinary drug-discovery capabilities encompassing medicinal chemistry, target identification and engagement, screening, pharmacokinetics, formulation and related pharmaceutical sciences. In 2010, the center received an $8.3 million Drug Discovery Initiative allocation from Temple University, which supported the development of research infrastructure and recruitment of faculty and research staff.

Abou-Gharbia has also held academic and advisory appointments at institutions including the University of Pennsylvania, Northeastern University, the University of Ferrara and King's College London. At Temple, his teaching has included medicinal chemistry and courses in drug discovery, and his academic service has included research, tenure and promotion, faculty recruitment, accreditation and university governance committees.

== Research and scholarly work ==
Abou-Gharbia's research has focused primarily on medicinal chemistry and small-molecule drug discovery. His work has included the design and synthesis of compounds directed toward central nervous system disorders, cancer, substance-use disorders and other therapeutic areas.

Abou-Gharbia has also been involved in efforts to promote biomedical research capacity outside the United States, including the establishment of the Qatar Biomedical Research Institute (QBRI) in 2012, an initiative developed to advance biomedical research and scientific collaboration in Qatar.

== Personal life ==
Abou-Gharbia is married to Dr. Lamaat Shalaby and they have three children Neveen, Shereen and Kareem.

== Awards and recognition ==
- Grand Hamadan Award in Biomedical Sciences (2014)
- PA Bio Innovation and Educator Researcher of the Year Award (2014)
- American Chemical Society (ACS) Heroes of Chemistry for Discovery of Effexor (2014), (Pfizer team)
- American Institute of Chemists Chemical Pioneer Award (2007)
- New Jersey Inventors Hall of Fame Award (2004)
- Procter Medal (2003)
- ACS Earle B. Barnes Award (2001)
- Prolific Inventor of the Decade (1998)
- ACS-Philadelphia Section Award (1997)
- Wyeth Exceptional Achievement Award (1992)
