= Langmuir (journal) =

- Discipline: Surface and colloid chemistry.
- Language: English
- Edited by: Gilbert Walker

Publication details
- History: 1985-present
- Publisher: American Chemical Society (United States)
- Frequency: Weekly
- Impact factor: 3.9 (2022)

Standard abbreviations
- ISO 4: Langmuir

Indexing
- CODEN: LANGD5
- ISSN: 0743-7463 (print); 1520-5827 (web)
- LCCN: 86649842
- OCLC no.: 10666233

Links
- Journal homepage

Langmuir is a peer-reviewed scientific journal that was established in 1985 and is published by the American Chemical Society. It is the leading journal focusing on the science and application of systems and materials in which the interface dominates structure and function. Research areas covered include surface and colloid chemistry. Langmuir publishes original research articles, invited feature articles, perspectives, and editorials.

The title honors Irving Langmuir, winner of the 1932 Nobel Prize for Chemistry. The founding editor-in-chief was Arthur W. Adamson.

== Abstracting and indexing ==
Langmuir is indexed in Chemical Abstracts Service, Scopus, EBSCOhost, British Library, PubMed, Web of Science, and SwetsWise.
