= Oxygen (play) =

2001 play by Roald Hoffman

Oxygen is a 2001 play by Roald Hoffman who received the chemistry Nobel prize in 1981, and Carl Djerassi, the Stanford biochemist.

The play was performed in several theaters around the world, the last of which was in Porto, Portugal. The play is a dramatisation of events leading to the discovery of oxygen in the eighteenth century.
