= George C. Pimentel Award in Chemical Education =

The George C. Pimentel Award in Chemical Education recognizes "outstanding contributions to chemical education." It is a national award, given annually by the American Chemical Society and sponsored by the ACS Division of Chemical Education and the Board of Publications. The award is named for George C. Pimentel, an American chemist and chemical educator who taught at the University of California, Berkeley. Prior to 1989, the award was named the ACS Award in Chemical Education.

== Past recipients ==
Source: American Chemical Society

- 2024 Donald J. Wink
- 2022, 2023 No award given
- 2021 Dudley E. Shallcross
- 2020 Thomas J. Wenzel
- 2019 Catherine H. Middlecamp
- 2018 Pratibha Varma-Nelson
- 2017 Thomas A. Holme
- 2016 Richard S. Moog
- 2015 I. Dwaine Eubanks
- 2014 Thomas J. Greenbowe
- 2013 Conrad L. Stanitski
- 2012 Diane M. Bunce
- 2011 William R. Robinson
- 2010 Zafra J. Margolin Lerman
- 2009 Henry W. Heikkinen
- 2008 Richard N. Zare
- 2007 A. Truman Schwartz
- 2006 F. Albert Cotton
- 2005 James N. Spencer
- 2004 Nicholas J. Turro
- 2003 George M. Bodner
- 2002 Michael P. Doyle
- 2001 Harry B. Gray
- 2000 Jerry A. Bell
- 1999 Mary Virginia Orna
- 1998 Stanley G. Smith
- 1997 Arthur B. Ellis
- 1996 Roald Hoffmann
- 1995 Ernest L. Eliel
- 1994 Glenn T. Seaborg
- 1993 George B. Kauffman
- 1992 Fred Basolo
- 1991 John W. Moore
- 1990 George C. Pimentel
- 1989 Joseph J. Lagowski
- 1988 Marjorie H. Gardner
- 1987 Linus Pauling
- 1986 Bassam Z. Shakhashiri
- 1985 Glenn A. Crosby
- 1984 Arthur W. Adamson
- 1983 Michell J. Sienko
- 1982 Anna J. Harrison
- 1981 Derek A. Davenport
- 1980 Henry A. Bent
- 1979 Gilbert P. Haight, Jr.
- 1978 Lloyd N. Ferguson
- 1977 Robert W. Parry
- 1976 Leallyn B. Clapp
- 1975 William T. Lippincott
- 1974 George S. Hammond
- 1973 Robert C. Brasted
- 1972 J. Arthur Campbell
- 1971 Laurence E. Strong
- 1970 Hubert N. Alyea
- 1969 L. Carroll King
- 1968 William F. Kieffer
- 1967 Louis F. Fieser
- 1966 W. Conway Pierce
- 1965 Theodore A. Ashford
- 1964 Alfred B. Garrett
- 1963 Edward L. Haenisch
- 1962 William G. Young
- 1961 John C. Bailar, Jr.
- 1960 Arthur F. Scott
- 1959 Harry F. Lewis
- 1958 Frank E. Brown
- 1957 Norris W. Rakestraw
- 1956 Otto M. Smith
- 1955 Gerrit Van Zyl
- 1954 Raymond E. Kirk
- 1953 Howard J. Lucas
- 1952 Joel H. Hildebrand

== See also ==
- List of chemistry awards
