= Dudley Shallcross =

British chemist and science educator

Dudley Shallcross OBE
- Education: University of Oxford
- Awards: Nyholm Prize for Education, 2017; George C. Pimentel Award in Chemical Education, 2021; OBE, 2024.
- Scientific career
- Workplaces: University of Bristol
- Thesis: Laboratory studies of radical reactions in the stratosphere (1994)
- Doctoral advisor: Richard P. Wayne

Dudley Edmund Shallcross OBE is a professor of chemistry at the University of Bristol, best known for his research in atmospheric chemistry and innovations in the remote teaching of science in schools. He was awarded an OBE in the King's Birthday Honours of 2024.

== Education ==
Shallcross went to Whitgift School from 1977 to 1984. Shallcross subsequently studied chemistry at the University of Southampton and, later, completed his doctoral research in atmospheric chemistry at the University of Oxford.

== Career ==
Shallcross was appointed to a lectureship in the department of chemistry at the University of Bristol in 1999. He was later promoted to Professor of Atmospheric Chemistry. In 2004, he was recognised as a National Teaching Fellow by Advance HE, a British educational charity. He was appointed director of the Primary Science Teaching Trust in 2010.

== Awards ==
Shallcross was awarded the Nyholm Prize for Education in 2017 by the Royal Society of Chemistry, and the George C. Pimentel Award in Chemical Education by the American Chemical Society in 2021. In 2024, Shallcross was awarded the OBE in the King's Birthday honours, for his outstanding contribution to science education in the UK and overseas.
