= Michael P. Doyle (chemist) =

American academic

Michael P. Doyle was a professor of chemistry at University of Texas at San Antonio. Doyle was awarded the George C. Pimentel Award in Chemical Education by the American Chemical Society in 2002. and elected as a Fellow of the American Association for the Advancement of Science in 1995. Doyle died on April 10, 2026.
