= Arthur W. Adamson =

American chemist

Arthur Wilson Adamson (August 15, 1919 – July 22, 2003) was an American chemist who is considered a pioneer in inorganic photochemistry. His research made significant contributions to the understanding of physical adsorption and contact angle phenomena, and the thermodynamics of surfaces and irreversible adsorption.

== Early life ==
Born to American missionaries in Shanghai, China, he received his B.S. in chemistry at the University of California at Berkeley in 1940 and his Ph.D. in physical chemistry at the University of Chicago in 1944.

== Career ==
After two years as a research associate for the Manhattan Project in Oak Ridge, Tennessee, he began a career at the University of Southern California that extended through his appointment as professor emeritus in 1989. He chaired the USC Department of Chemistry from 1972 to 1975.

== Awards ==
- 1967 Richard C. Tolman Medal
- 1979 American Chemical Society (ACS) Kendall Award in Surface or Colloid Chemistry
- 1982 ACS Award for Distinguished Service in the Advancement of Inorganic Chemistry,
- 1984 ACS Award in Chemical Education (now renamed the George C. Pimentel Award in Chemical Education)
- 1991 USC Faculty Lifetime Achievement Award
- 1994 American Institute of Chemists Gold Medal
- 1999 Monie A. Ferst Award

In 1992, the ACS established the Arthur W. Adamson Award for Distinguished Service in the Advancement of Surface Chemistry.

He was founding editor of Langmuir, the ACS Journal of Surfaces and Colloids, and he was chairman of the ACS Division of Colloid and Surface Chemistry.

== Bibliography ==
Books authored include:

- Concepts of Inorganic Photochemistry, Wiley & Sons Canada, Limited, John, ISBN 0-471-00795-1
- Physical Chemistry of Surfaces, Wiley & Sons, Incorporated, John, ISBN 0-471-00745-5
- A Textbook of Physical Chemistry, Cengage Learning, ISBN 0-12-044255-8
- Understanding Physical Chemistry, Stationery Office, The, ISBN 0-8053-0128-3
