= American College of Sofia =

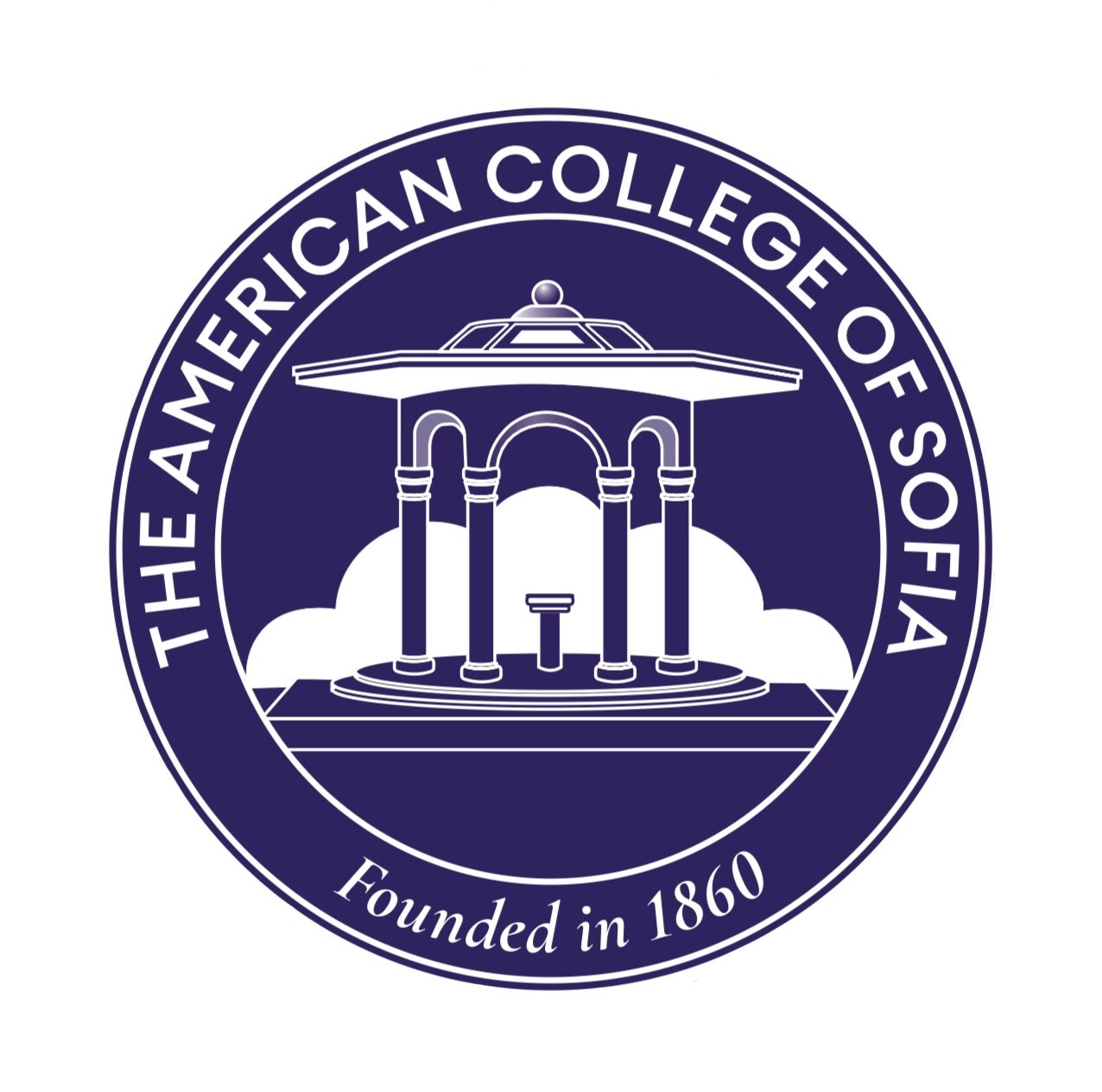

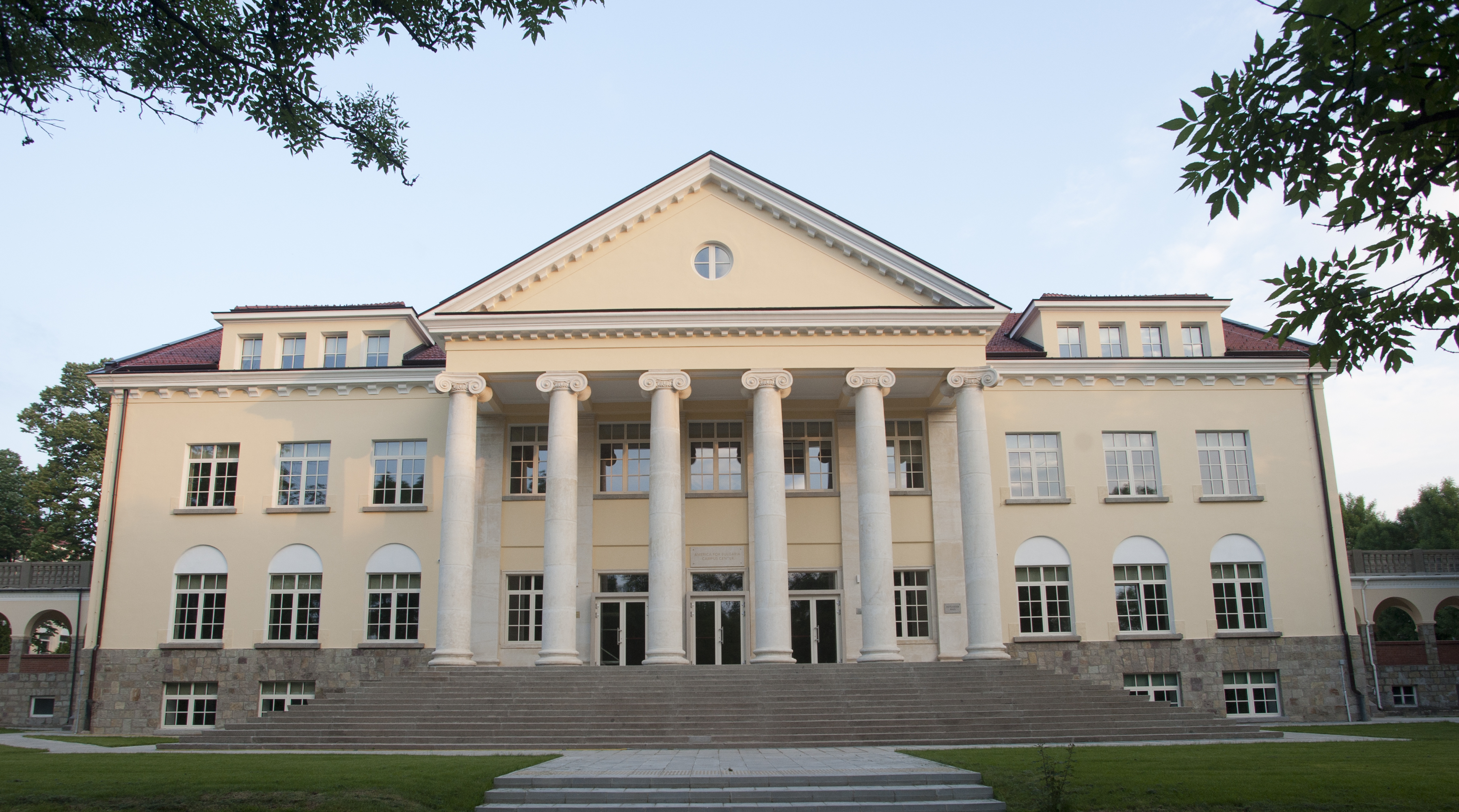

Location
- Floyd Black Lane, 1799 Mladost 2, Sofia; Bulgaria; 42°37′55″N 23°21′59″E

Information
- Type: Private International School
- Established: 1860
- President: Emily Sargent Beasley
- Grades: 8-12
- Campus size: 21 ha (52 acres)
- Colors: Indigo, White
- Mascot: Phoenix
- Newspaper: ACS Newsletter; College Life; ACS Alumni Magazine
- Website: www.acs.bg

The American College of Sofia (ACS) (Bulgarian: Американски колеж в София) is a school in Bulgaria, located in the capital city of Sofia. The college was founded in 1860 and is regarded as the oldest American educational institution outside the United States. American pedagogical methods are used and the primary language of instruction is English.

== History ==
Founded in 1860 in the then-Ottoman Empire, it was initially a boys' school in Plovdiv, established by American missionaries of the Congregational Church. By co-operating with a girls' school in Stara Zagora founded by the same people, the American College was established and moved to Samokov in 1871. They were the first boarding schools in the country. The teachers were mostly American and many of the school's Bulgarian students went on to become ministers and important social figures.

As the Mission Boards decided to close the schools at Samokov and leave Bulgaria, a decision met with protests and discontent among Bulgarian alumni and American donors alike, the schools were transferred to another organization, Sofia American Schools, Inc., merged and moved to Sofia in 1926. The construction of a campus in Simeonovo began the same year to start accommodating 119 girls in 1928, 63 boys in 1929, as well as the remaining 130 a year later.

With Bulgaria initially being on the side of the Axis powers during World War II, many of the teachers left and only a handful had remained when Bulgaria declared war on the United States in December 1941. They continued to operate the college until ousted by the pro-Axis authorities in the autumn of 1942. As the war ended and Bulgaria became a communist state, the American College's entire property was confiscated in 1947 and the campus was used as the office of the Bulgarian State Police during the times of socialism.

The college was reopened in September 1992, enrolling 50 boys and 50 girls from over 3,000 that signed up to take the specified test. Much of the old campus and many of the pre-World War II American College buildings have since then been given back to the college, yet parts of the campus are still occupied by the Police Academy. As of 2005, the American College of Sofia has 606 Bulgarian and 33 foreign students and has enrolled over a thousand, with 848 graduating. Since June 2005, the college also offers the IB Diploma Programme, only for the international students. The former president of the American College of Sofia is Thomas Cangiano, former Cleve Housemaster and History Master at the Lawrenceville School. The current president is Emily Sargent-Beasley. The first class of the reopened school celebrated their 10-year reunion in June 2007.

== Campus ==
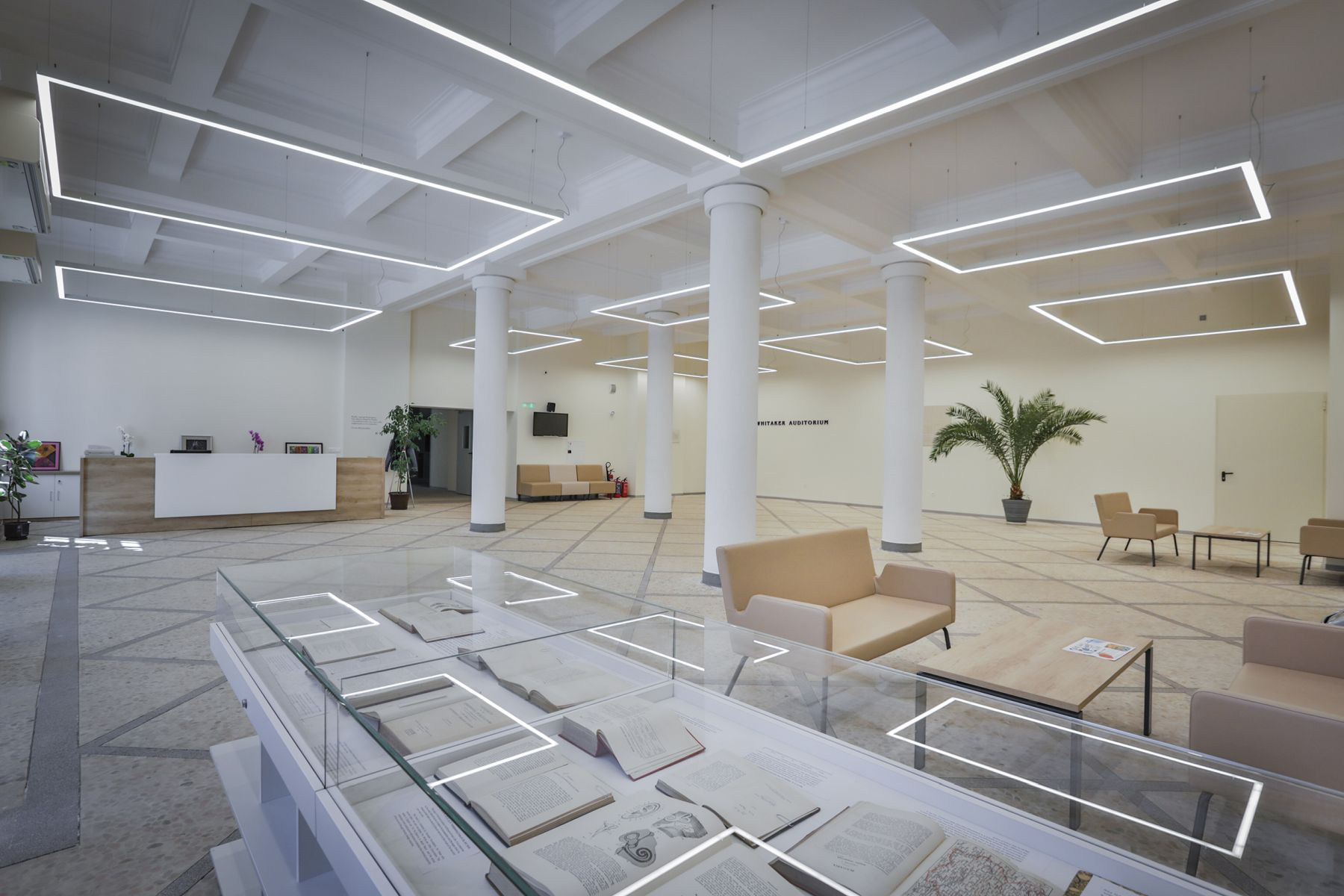
Ostrander Hall's main lobby

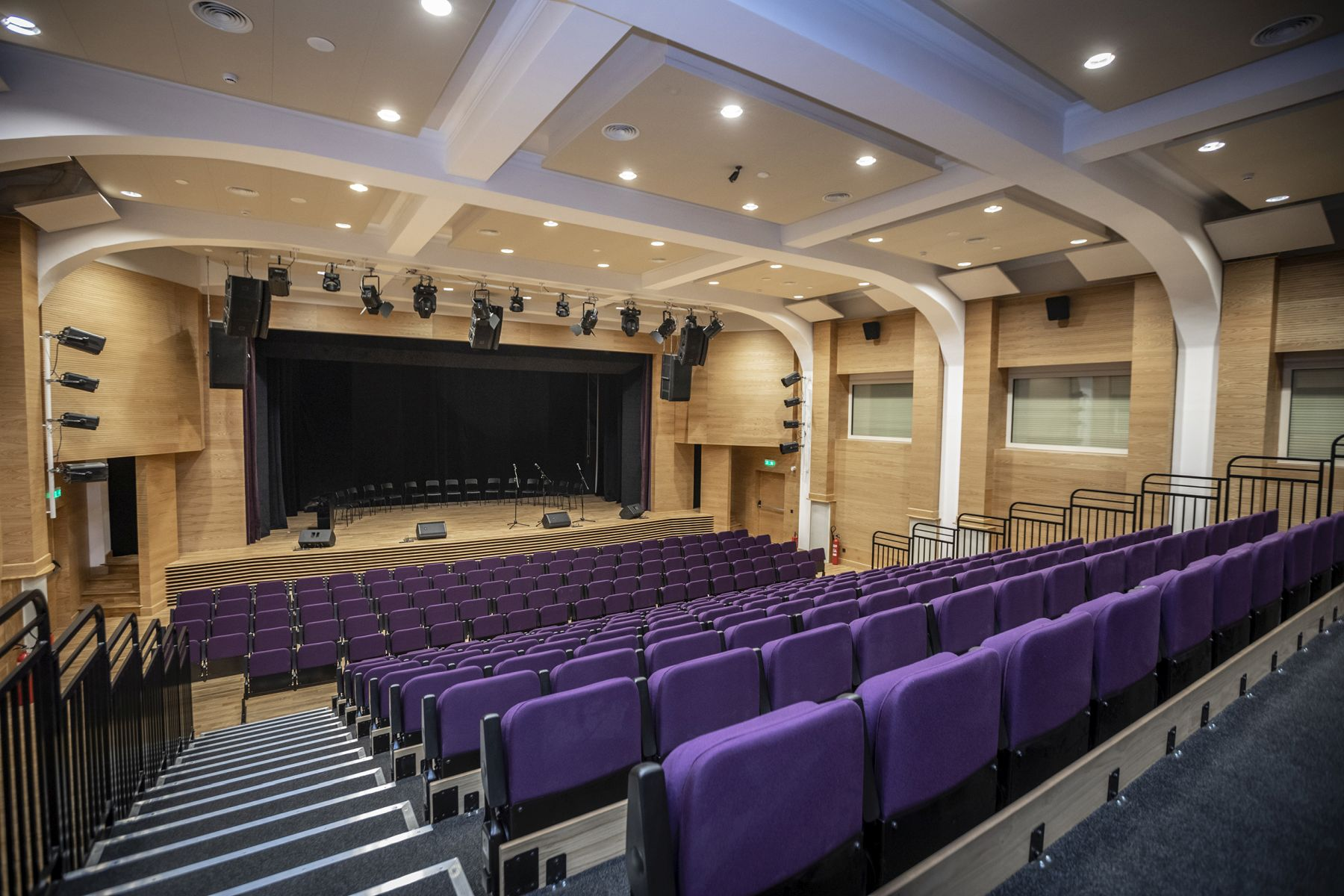
Whitaker Auditorium

The campus consists of seven academic buildings, a student dormitory, faculty housing and various sports facilities.

Academic Buildings	Function and Features
Ostrander Hall	Ostrander Hall houses the Reception desk, administrative offices, SCIFI, the Audio-Video Studio, the medical facilities, the fitness center, and the Whitaker Auditorium. It is conjoined with the America for Bulgaria Campus Center.
America for Bulgaria Campus Center	America for Bulgaria Campus Center houses the Gipson Library, the Cafeteria and kitchen facilities, the cafe, the Ferren Meeting Room, and the Jim Clayton Writing Center. It is conjoined with Ostrander Hall.
Djerassi Hall	Djerassi Hall houses the Science Department classrooms and offices; chemistry, physics, and biology labs, and a sports hall. Named after Prof. Carl Djerassi.
Sanders Hall	Sanders Hall houses the ESL Department, the English Language and Literature Department, the IT Office, the school psychologist's offices, and the External Programs Office. Named after Irwin T. Sanders.
Building #5	Building #5 houses the Mathematics and Computer Science Department, the Foreign Languages Department, the Fine Arts classrooms and Music room, and a Concert Hall.
Abbott Hall	Abbott Hall houses the Liberal and Fine Arts Department, the Computer Science Department, the Sports Department, and the security guards’ office. Named after Ms. Inez Abbott.
Building #7	Building #7 houses the Bulgarian Language and Literature Department classrooms and offices. Often referred to as "Bulgarian Language Building"

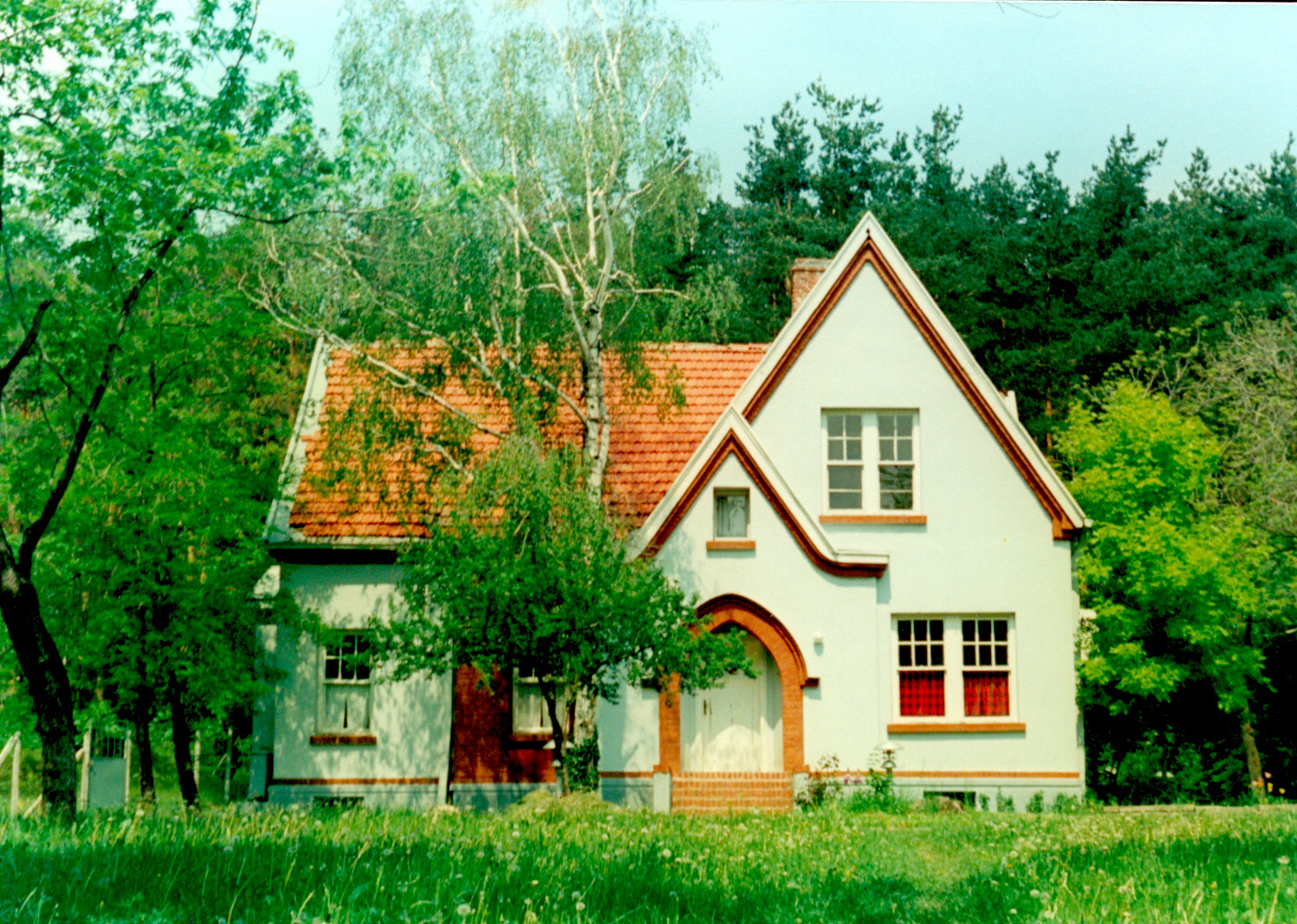
Faculty housing

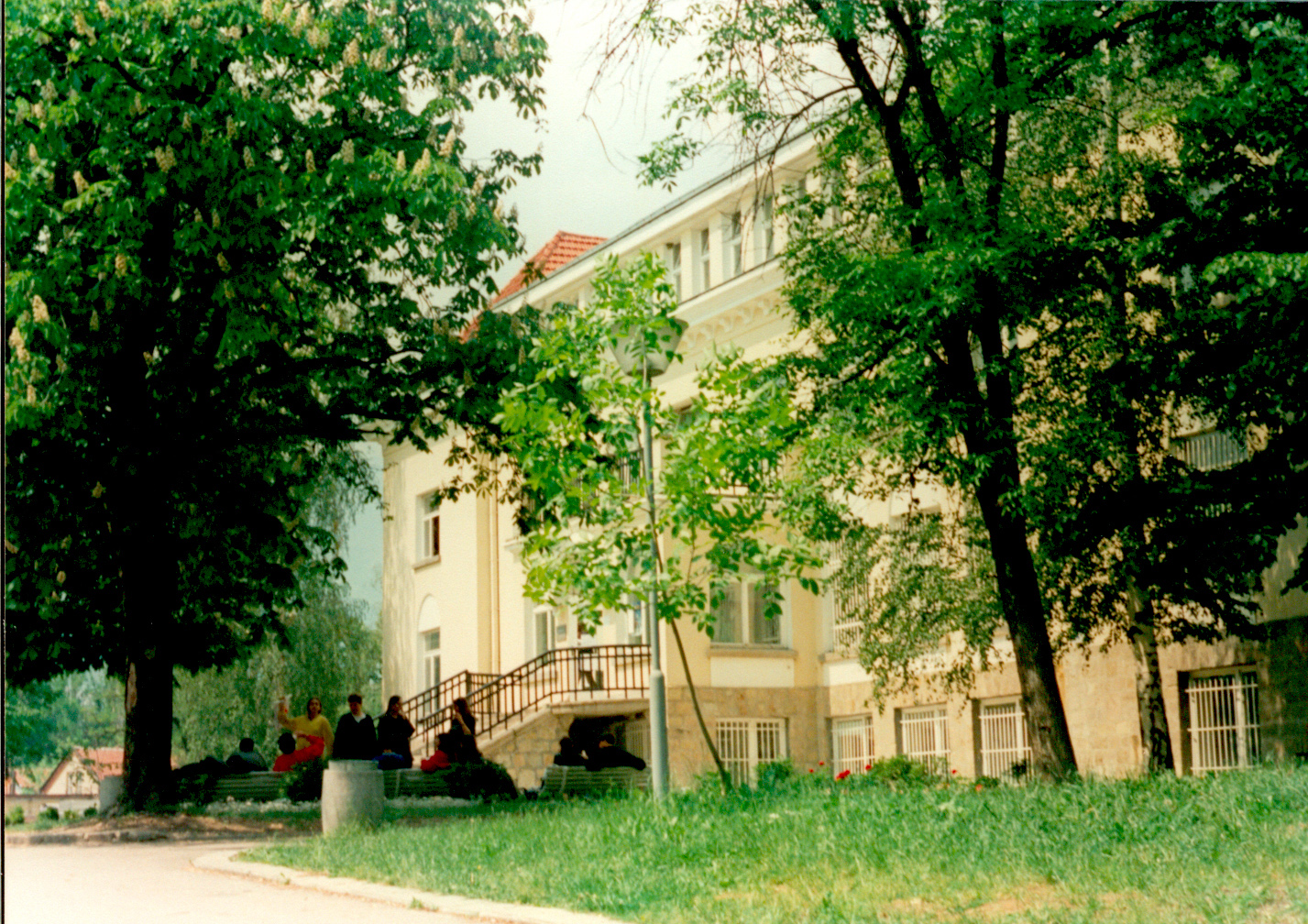
Sanders Hall

Sports Facilities	Function and Features
The Gym (The Bubble)	A multifunctional sports hall that encompasses 1,276 square meters. It may be configured to be three basketball courts, two volleyball courts, two tennis courts, two badminton courts, or a handball field. It is nicknamed "The Bubble".
Asphalt Sports Field	Formerly a basketball field, it is currently used as a parking lot and an assembly point in case of emergency. It has a size of 2,500 square meters.
Green Sports Field	Green Field is a 2,000-square-meter natural grass field. While it is most frequently used for football, it may accommodate other outside activities such as concerts.
Tennis Court	A 450-square-meter tennis court.

Miscelanious	Function and Features
Perske House	The school's student dormitory. It has 10 rooms and can accommodate 28 students in total.
The Fountain	The fountain is the symbol of the American College of Sofia, as seen on the logo, among other places. It is located in the center of the college campus. The fountain is a replica of an old Turkish fountain in Samokov, the previous location of the American College.
Dafina Garden	The garden encompasses a 1,700-square-meter area in the central part of the college campus. It accommodates various artworks. Named in memory of Dafina Georgieva.

== Curriculum ==
The American College of Sofia has 5 academic grades: 8th or “prep” grade and the 4 high school grades, 9th-12th.

=== IB Program ===
At ACS, the IB program is available only to international students. International members receive an IB diploma, as well as the American High School Diploma.

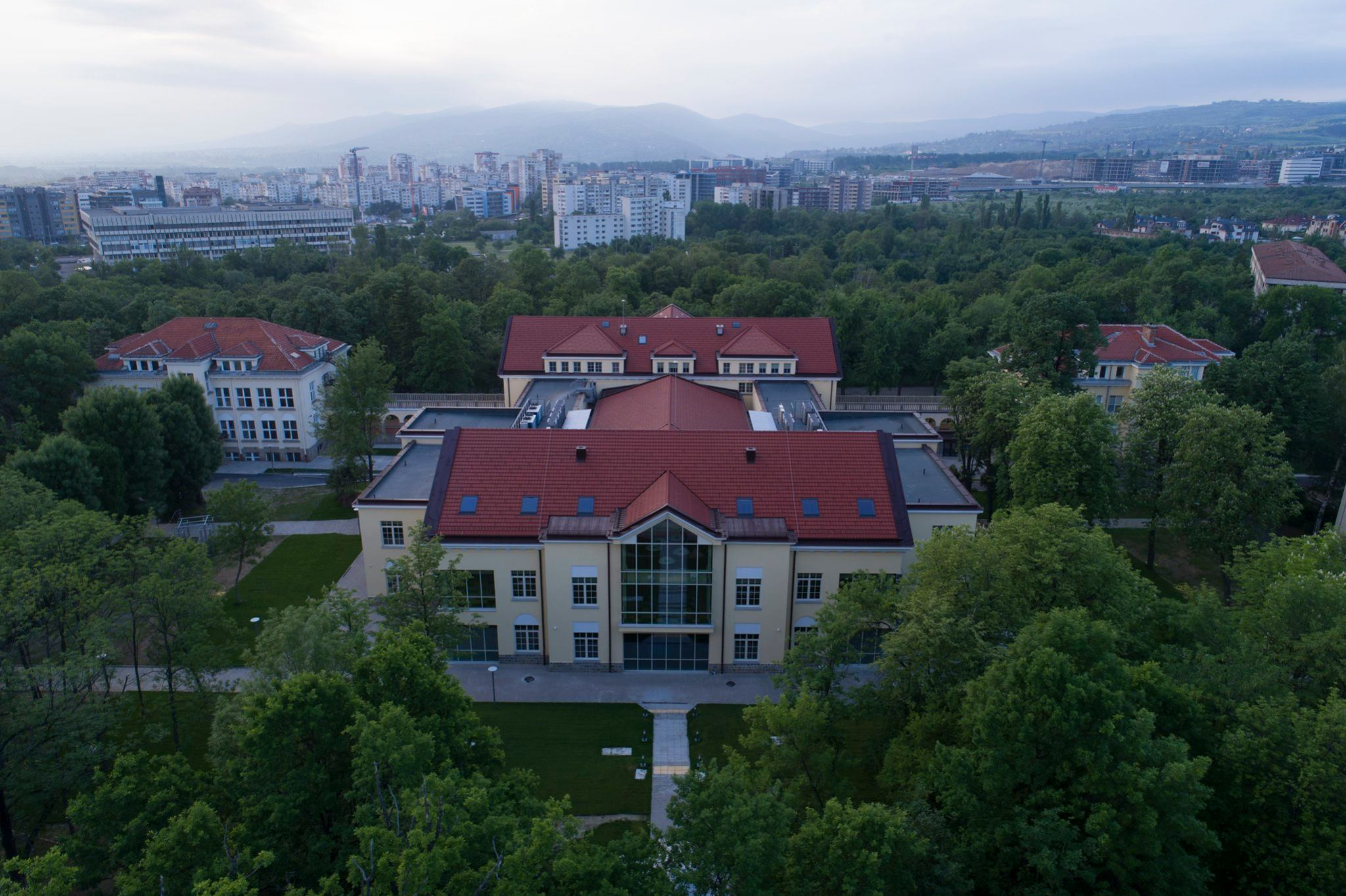
The campus with the America for Bulgaria Campus Center in the foreground

=== American High School Diploma ===
All students at ACS receive an American High School Diploma. Bulgarian students at ACS also earn a Bulgarian Diploma.

=== Bulgarian Diploma ===
Bulgarian students at ACS receive a Bulgarian Diploma and an American High School Diploma.

== Innovative schools status ==
In 2017 the Bulgarian Ministry of Education granted ACS with an "innovative school" status.
