= Marek W. Urban =

American scientist

Marek W. Urban is an American professor and polymer and materials scientist who works in polymers, polymer spectroscopy, stimuli-responsive materials, and self-healing polymers.

He studied at Marquette University where he received MS degree (1979) and continued at Michigan Technological University where he received his doctorate in chemistry and chemical engineering (1984), followed by postdoctoral fellowship at Case Western Reserve University (1984–86).

He is currently the J.E. Sirrine Foundation Endowed Chair and professor at Clemson University in the Department of Materials Science and Engineering and the Department of Chemistry. His prior appointments included department chair positions at North Dakota State University and the University of Southern Mississippi. He also has led and directed the National Science Foundation Research Centers, Industry/University Cooperative Research Center in Coatings (1995–2005) and Materials Research Science and Engineering Center (MRSEC) on Stimuli-Responsive Polymeric Films and Coatings. Numerous media, including New York Times, Forbes, BBC, National Geographic, Discovery, The Economist, Discovery Channel, USA Today, local TV stations, and many others have featured his research group (Urban Research Group) discoveries in stimuli-responsive polymers, including self-healing films, colloidal synthesis, and antimicrobial surfaces.

== Selected publications ==
BOOKS Stimuli-Responsive Materials: From Molecules to Nature Mimicking Materials Design. Royal Society of Chemistry, Cambridge, UK, 2016.

Handbook of Stimuli-Responsive Materials, Wiley-VCH, Verlag & Co. KGaA, Weinheim, Germany, 2011.

Attenuated Total Reflectance Spectroscopy of Polymeric Materials; Theory and Practice, American Chemical Society and Oxford University Press, 1996.

Vibrational Spectroscopy of Molecules and Macromolecules on Surfaces, John Wiley & Sons, 1993.

RESEARCH PUBLICATIONS

"Ion-Lock Storage With Multi-Logic Circuitry Gated by Polar–Dipolar Interactions in Poly(Ionic Liquids),” Angew. Chem. Int. Ed., 2026, e7512063, doi.org/10.1002/anie.7512063.

“Competing Dipolar and van der Waals Forces in Dynamic Self-Healing of Poly(Ionic Liquid) Copolymers,” Angew. Chemie Inter. Ed., 2026, 65, e19835.

“Electrical Energy Storage by Poly(ionic Liquids),” Angew. Chem. Int. Ed., 2025, e202424185.

“Fluorophilic--Lock Self-Healable Copolymers,” Angew. Chemie Inter. Ed. 2024, doi.org/10.1002/anie.202405504.

"Ring-and-Lock Self-Healable Styrenic Copolymers,” J. Amer. Chem. Soc., 2023, 145, 17, 9693–9699.

"Redefining Polymer Science via Multi-Stimulus-Responsiveness,” CHEM, 2023, 9, 1362-1377.

"Self-Healing Polymers," Nature Rev. Mat., 2020, 5, 562–583.

"Water accelerated self-healing of hydrophobic copolymers,” Nature, Commun., 2020, 11: 5743.

"Entropy and Interfacial Energy Driven Self-healable Polymers,” Nature Commun., 2020, 11:1028

"Key-and-Lock Commodity Self-Healing Copolymers," Science, 2018, 362(6411), 220–225.

"Dynamic materials: The Chemistry of Self-Healing," Nature Chem., 2012, 4, 80–82.

"Water accelerated self-healing of hydrophobic copolymers,” Nature Commun., 2020, 11, 5743.

"Phage-Bacterium War on Polymeric Surfaces: Can Surface-Anchored Bacteriophages Eliminate Microbial Infections?" Biomacromolecules, 2013, 14(5), 1257–1261.

"Self-Repairable Polyurethane Networks by Atmospheric Carbon Dioxide and Water," Angewandte Chemie Inter. Ed., 2014, 53(45), 12142–12147.

"One-Step Synthesis of Amphiphilic Ultrahigh Molecular Weight Block Copolymers by Surfactant-Free Heterogeneous Radical Polymerization," ACS Macro Lett., 2015, 4, 1317–1320.

"Instantaneous Directional Growth of Block Copolymer Nanowires During Heterogeneous Radical Polymerization (HRP)," Nano Lett., 2016, 16(4), 2873–2877.
