= Ralph F. Hirschmann =

American biochemist

- Born: May 6, 1922; Fürth, Bavaria, Germany
- Died: June 20, 2009 (aged 87); Lansdale, Pennsylvania
- Education: University of Wisconsin–Madison; Oberlin College
- Known for: first Organic synthesis of an enzyme, a ribonuclease
- Awards: William H. Nichols Medal (1988); National Medal of Science (2000); Willard Gibbs Award (2002)
- Scientific career
- Fields: Medicinal Chemistry
- Workplaces: Medical University of South Carolina; University of Pennsylvania; Merck & Co.

Ralph Franz Hirschmann (May 6, 1922 – June 20, 2009) was a German American chemist who led a team that was responsible for the first organic synthesis of an enzyme, a ribonuclease.

== Early life and education ==
Born on May 6, 1922, in Fürth, he emigrated from Nazi Germany in 1936 and settled with his family in Kansas City, Missouri. He became a naturalized citizen of the United States in 1944. After graduating from Oberlin College in 1943, he served in the United States Army for three years in the Pacific Theater of Operations. Following the completion of his military service, Hirschmann attended the University of Wisconsin–Madison, receiving his Doctor of Philosophy in organic chemistry in 1950.

== Medicinal Chemistry career ==
While at Merck & Co., where he was hired as a researcher in 1950, he led a team that developed a method to synthesize the enzyme ribonuclease. His team was successful, with their results announced in January 1969 parallel with those from a separate team led by Bernd Gutte and Robert Bruce Merrifield at Rockefeller University who also achieved synthesis of the same enzyme using a different method. The comparatively simple 124-amino acid structure of ribonuclease made it a logical target for the first enzyme to synthesize. Hirschmann's team built the enzyme in amino acid groups from six to 17 in length which were assembled into two large sections that were linked together, while Merrifield's approach was to assemble the entire enzyme by linking one amino acid at a time at the end of a chain. The achievement was front-page news in The New York Times, heralding the fact that "An Enzyme Is Synthesized for First Time" and providing coverage of a joint announcement by the two teams. While no immediate applications were foreseen, the Merck team noted that the ability to synthesize enzymes opened a new class of drugs for potential therapeutic use.

In Hirschmann's obituary in The New York Times, chemist Daniel Rich described the feat of synthesizing an enzyme as "a huge discovery" that "bridged the interface between chemistry and biology", and that by the time of Hirschmann's death the accomplishment was "just routine". Chemist Gary Molander of the University of Pennsylvania described how "[d]ozens of biotechnology and drug companies were started" based on Hirschmann's developments and that "[t]he whole biotechnology field" and new classes of medicines, such as protease inhibitors for the treatment of AIDS, were established through his approach.

As head of Merck's department of new lead discovery starting in 1971 and as senior vice president for basic research in chemistry starting in 1978, serving until the retirement age of 65, when he left the firm in 1987, Hirschmann played a pivotal role in the development of many of the firm's products. Among the medications he was involved with was the development of the antiparasitic Ivermectin used for the treatment of river blindness, the statin Mevacor for reducing cholesterol in patients at risk of cardiovascular disease, the beta-lactam-family broad-spectrum antibiotic Primaxin, the synthetic androgen Proscar used for the treatment of enlarged prostate and prostate cancer and of the ACE inhibitor Vasotec for treating hypertension.

Following his departure from Merck, Hirschmann taught at the University of Pennsylvania and the Medical University of South Carolina until his retirement in 2006.

== Awards and recognition ==
When Merrifield was awarded the Nobel Prize in Chemistry in 1984 for the invention of solid phase peptide synthesis some, such as Daniel Rich of the American Chemical Society expressed the view that he was "surprised that Hirschmann didn't share the Nobel Prize".

He was awarded the National Medal of Science in 2000 by President of the United States Bill Clinton. He was presented the award at a December 1, 2000, dinner by Dr. Neal Francis Lane, Assistant to the President for Science & Technology:

For his seminal contributions to organic and to medicinal chemistry including the synthesis in solution of an enzyme (ribonuclease), his stimulation of peptide research in the Pharmaceutical Industry and for his leadership role in fostering interdisciplinary research in academia and in industry, which led to the discovery of several widely prescribed medications for human and animal health.

Hirschmann received the Arthur C. Cope Award for achievement in the field of organic chemistry research from the American Chemical Society in 1999 and the American Institute of Chemists Gold Medal in 2003.

The Ralph F. Hirschmann Award in Peptide Chemistry is given out "to recognize and encourage outstanding achievements in the chemistry, biochemistry, and biophysics of peptides." The award was established in 1988 by Merck Research Laboratories.

== Personal ==
Hirschmann died at age 87 on June 29, 2009, due to renal failure at his home in Lansdale, Pennsylvania.
