= James Flack Norris Award for Outstanding Achievement in the Teaching of Chemistry =

The James Flack Norris Award is an award handed out yearly for "outstanding contributions to the field of chemical education". The award, which was established in 1950 and was handed out the first time in 1951 was created by the Northeastern Section of the American Chemical Society in memory of the contributions of James Flack Norris, professor of Chemistry at the Massachusetts Institute of Technology.

== See also ==
- List of chemistry awards
