= Temple University School of Pharmacy =

American graduate school

Coordinates: 40.003901°N 75.151884°W

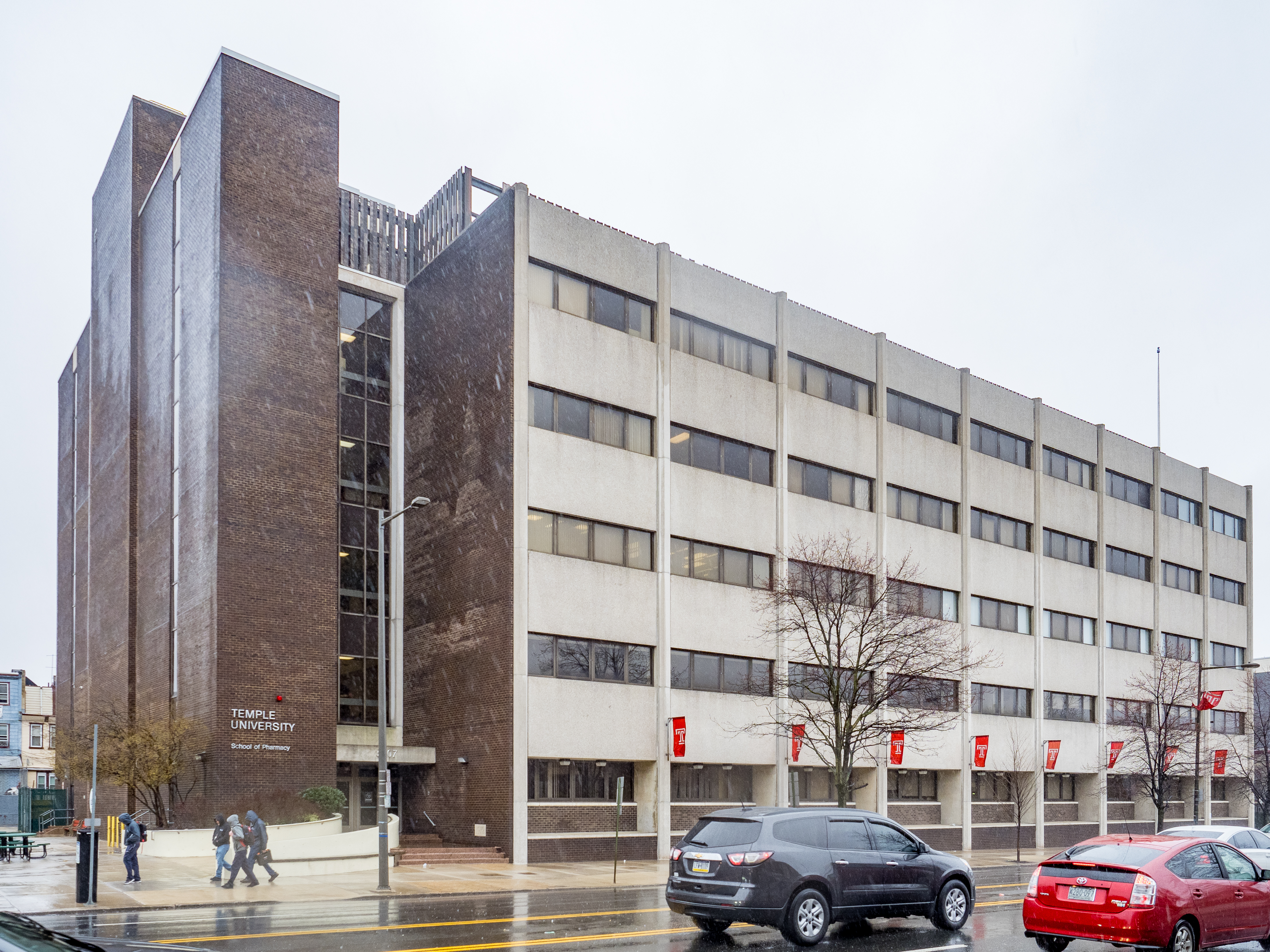
- Type: State-related
- Established: 1901
- Dean: S. Suresh Madhavan
- Faculty: 66 (Fall 2024)
- Students: 591 (Fall 2024)
- Location: Philadelphia, Pennsylvania, United States
- Campus: Health Science Campus
- Website: pharmacy.temple.edu

The Temple University School of Pharmacy (TUSP) is a graduate pharmacy school of the Temple University in Philadelphia, Pennsylvania, United States. Founded in 1901, it offers Doctor of Pharmacy (PharmD), Doctor of Philosophy (PhD) and Master of Science degrees.

== History ==
Temple University School of Pharmacy was founded in 1901, initially as a two-year program sharing classes with the Medical School. First classes were held in 1901 at College Hall, but moved to Eighteenth and Buttonwood Campus (adjacent to the present Community College of Philadelphia) in 1907. The pharmacy school stayed in this building until 1947. In 1907, School of Pharmacy separated from the Medical School and Dr. John R. Minehart was appointed as the first Dean of Pharmacy, serving until 1932. Dean Minehart oversaw the expansion of School of Pharmacy to a three year course and its accreditation by American Association of Colleges of Pharmacy in 1928.

Harvey Evert Kendig succeeded Dean Minehart and oversaw the moving of the School of Pharmacy to a new campus located at 3223 N Broad Street in 1947 which is the current location of Temple University School of Dentistry. Under Dean Kendig, the School of Pharmacy curriculum saw the expansion to a coursework of four years. Joseph B. Sprowles became the Dean of Pharmacy in 1950, serving until 1967. A Master of Science program was established in 1968 in Quality Assurance and Regulatory Affairs (QA/RA) to serve the needs of professionals in pharmaceutical industry under his guidance.

In 1974, School of Pharmacy moved to its current location at 3307 N Broad Street with the help of funding from the Commonwealth of Pennsylvania, Temple University and federal grants. Peter H. Doukas has been serving the School of Pharmacy since 1990. Under his leadership, the Master's program in QA/RA was moved to the Fort Washington Campus in order to accommodate the increased number of pharmaceutical companies located in the Greater Philadelphia Area.

On November 1, 2019, School of Pharmacy saw a change in leadership as Dean Doukas stepped down and was succeeded by Jayanth Panyam.

== Academics ==
Temple University School of Pharmacy awards Doctor of Pharmacy degree which is its main offering. In addition, a graduate program in Pharmaceutical Sciences is established with concentrations in Medicinal Chemistry, Pharmaceutics and Pharmacodynamics available offering Master of Science and Doctor of Pharmacy degrees. A Master of Science in Quality Assurance and Regulatory Affairs has been established since 1968 as the first program of its kind in United States at that time.

== Kendig Memorial Museum ==
The museum is dedicated to the memory of Dean Harvey Evert Kendig who served the School of Pharmacy from 1907 to 1950. It was opened in 1957 and moved to its current location in 1974. The museum houses fixtures which were originally part of Old Morgan Pharmacy, where Wyeth Brothers worked who went on to found Wyeth. The collection also houses pharmaceutical equipment, specie jars, show globes and other equipment of an apothecary.
