= Gustav Egloff =

American chemist

Gustav Egloff (1886–1955) was an American chemist nicknamed Gasoline Gus. He was Universal Oil Products' first chemist and by 1917 became their director, serving in that capacity until death. Science magazine described him as a "human catalyst".

He was president of the American Institute of Chemists from 1942 to 1946, and chairman of the American Chemical Society from 1947 to 1948.

He had 280 patents to his name and wrote over 600 articles, mostly on the subject of petroleum and hydrocarbons.

He holds the record for one of the longest answers to a question in a courtroom in relation to a lawsuit in St. Louis regarding one of his patents. On being asked "What do you know about emulsions?" his response continued for 21 days.

== Life ==
Egloff was born in New York City on 10 November 1886 to Swiss parents.

He graduated from Cornell University in 1912 and received his doctorate from Columbia in 1915.

In 1915 he got his first job with Universal Oil Products, based in Independence, Kansas. There he worked with Carbon P. Dubbs (son of Jesse A. Dubbs) building a demulsification unit to create gasoline. This is a means of creating gasoline artificially rather than pumping it out of the ground in a "natural" form, and is a forerunner to fracking. This “artificial” gasoline was named "polymer gasoline".

In 1940 he received the American Institute of Chemists Gold Medal and the National Research Council gave him a distinguished service award in 1941. In 1950 the Royal Society of Arts in Britain made him an Honorary Fellow.

In 1953 he was elected an Honorary Foreign Fellow of the Royal Society of Edinburgh.

In 1954, he won the Carl Engler Medal for petroleum research and refinery technology.

In later life he largely operated from an office on Michigan Avenue in Chicago. He lived at 2100 Lincoln Park West.

He died in Alexian Brothers Hospital in Chicago on 29 April 1955. He is buried in St. Johns Cemetery in Yonkers, New York.

== Family and personal life ==
Egloff married Clara Mellor in Pittsburgh in 1915. Unable to have children of their own, they raised their great-niece Adele M. Costello from the age of 5, after the death of her father reduced the family circumstances, making it impossible for her mother to care for all six children.

Egloff was a keen cyclist and in early life an amateur wrestler.

He anonymously helped many struggling students achieve their goals, always via third parties.

== Publications ==
- The Properties of Mixed Liquids: Phenol and Water (1916)
- The Cracking of Bitumen from Canadian Alberta Tar Sands (1926)
- The Refining of Seminole Crude Oil (1927)
- The Cracking Process: A Universal Source of Motor Fuel (1928)
- Earth Oil (1933)
- Thermal Reactions of Aromatic Hydrocarbons (1934)
- Catalytic Production of Polymer Gasoline (1936)
- The Reactions of Pure Hydrocabons (1937)
- Cracking Oils the World Over (1937)
- The Cracking Art in 1937: UOP (1937)
- The Cracking Art in 1938: UOP (1938)
- The Cracking Art in 1939: UOP (1939)
- Catalysis Inorganic and Organic (1940)
- Sulfur Limits in Gasoline (1941)
- Emulsions and Foams (1941) with Sophia Berkman
- Isomerization of Pure Hydrocarbons (1942)
- Physical Constants of Hydrocarbons (1947)
- Alkylation of Alkanes (1948)
- The Engineer in the Oil Industry (1954)
