= Carl Djerassi =

American pharmaceutical chemist and writer (1923–2015)

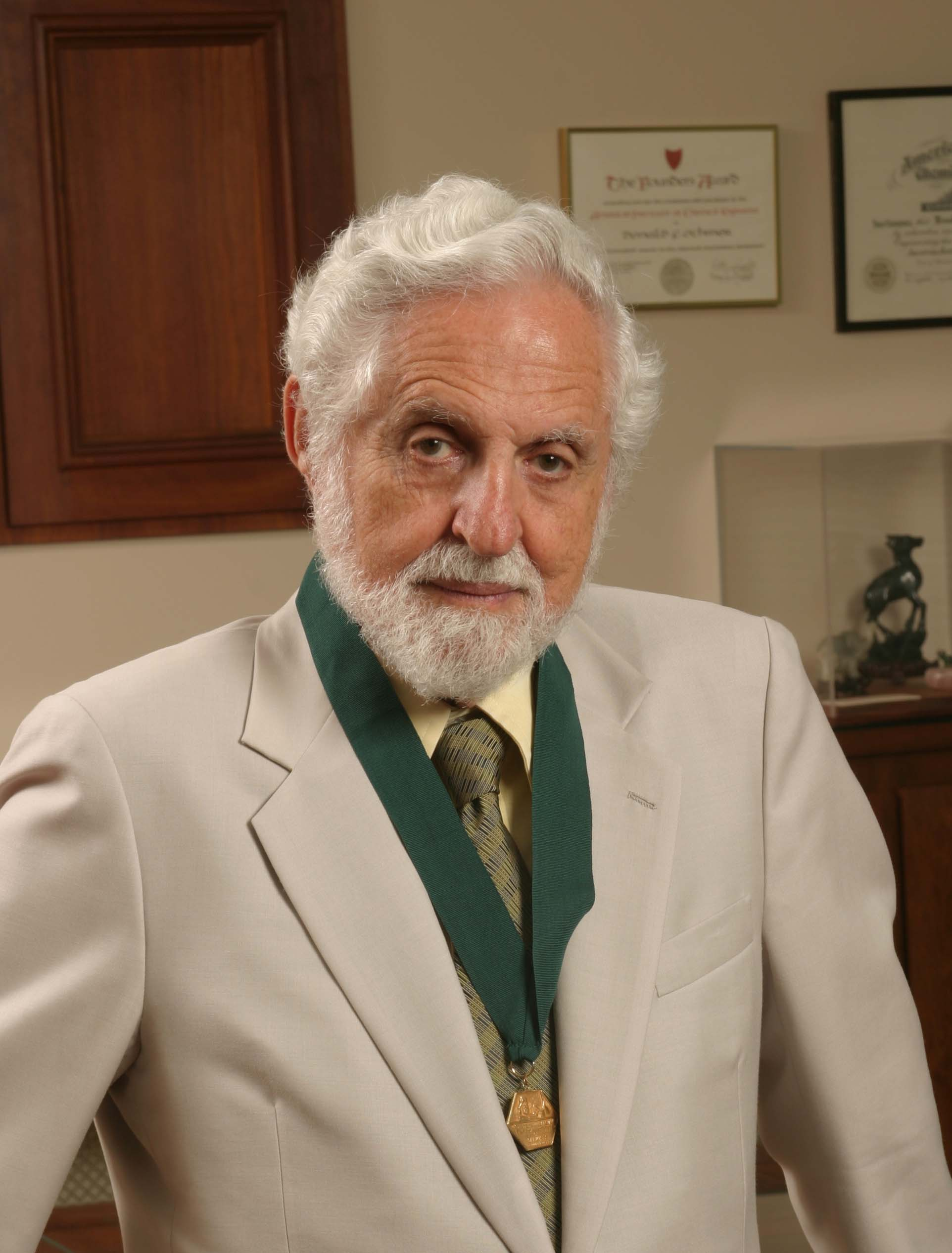
- Djerassi in 2004
- Born: October 29, 1923; Vienna, Austria
- Died: January 30, 2015 (aged 91); San Francisco, California, U.S.
- Education: Kenyon College (BS); University of Wisconsin–Madison (PhD)
- Known for: Development of contraceptive pill; Djerassi Artists Residency
- Children: 2
- Parents: Samuel Djerassi (father); Alice Friedmann (mother)
- Scientific career
- Fields: Chemistry
- Workplaces: Syntex; Wayne State University; Stanford University
- Website: www.djerassi.com

Carl Djerassi (October 29, 1923 – January 30, 2015) was a Viennese-born Bulgarian-American pharmaceutical chemist, novelist, playwright and co-founder of Djerassi Resident Artists Program with Diane Wood Middlebrook. He is best known for his contribution to the development of oral contraceptive pills, nicknamed the "father of the pill".

== Early life ==
Carl Djerassi was born in Vienna, Austria, and spent the first years of his infancy in Sofia, Bulgaria, the home of his father, Samuel Djerassi, a dermatologist and specialist in sexually transmitted diseases. His mother was Alice Friedmann, a Viennese dentist and physician. Both parents were Jewish.

Following his parents' divorce, Djerassi and his mother moved to Vienna. Until the age of 14, he attended the same grammar school that Sigmund Freud had attended many years earlier; spending summers in Bulgaria with his father.

Austria refused him citizenship and after the Anschluss, his father briefly remarried his mother in 1938 to allow Carl and his mother to escape the Nazi regime and flee to Sofia, Bulgaria, where he lived with his father for a year. Bulgaria, although not immune to antisemitism, proved a safe haven, as the country managed to save its entire 48,000-strong Jewish population from deportation to Nazi concentration camps. During his time in Sofia, Djerassi attended the American College of Sofia, where he became fluent in English.

In December 1939, Djerassi arrived with his mother in the United States, nearly penniless. Djerassi's mother worked in a group practice in upstate New York. In 1949, his father emigrated to the United States, practiced in Pennsylvania and West Virginia, and eventually retired near his son in San Francisco, California.

== Education ==
Djerassi started his college career at Newark Junior College, after moving to the United States with his mother when he was 16. He had previously attended the American College of Sofia, a high school in Sofia, Bulgaria, where he became fluent in English. Because of the name of his high school, he was misunderstood and enrolled into Newark Junior College before graduating high school. After a year at Newark Junior College, Djerassi wrote a letter to First Lady Eleanor Roosevelt asking for help with a room and board and tuition scholarship to a four-year college. He received a response from the Institute of International Education with a full scholarship to Tarkio College where he briefly attended, and then studied chemistry at Kenyon College, where he graduated summa cum laude. After one year at CIBA, he moved to the University of Wisconsin–Madison where he earned his PhD in organic chemistry in 1945. His thesis work examined the transformation of the male sex hormone testosterone into the female sex hormone estradiol, through a sequence of chemical reactions.

== Career ==
In 1942/43, Djerassi worked for CIBA in New Jersey, developing Pyribenzamine (tripelennamine), his first patent and one of the first commercial antihistamines.

In 1949, Djerassi became associate director of research at Syntex in Mexico City and remained there through 1951. He said that one factor influencing him to choose Syntex was that they had a DU spectrophotometer. He worked on a new synthesis of cortisone based on diosgenin, a steroid sapogenin derived from a Mexican wild yam. His team later synthesized norethisterone (norethindrone), the first highly active progestin analogue that was effective when taken by mouth. This became part of one of the first successful combined oral contraceptive pills, known colloquially as the birth-control pill, or simply, the Pill. From 1952 to 1959, Djerassi was professor of chemistry at Wayne State University in Detroit.

He participated in the invention in 1951, together with Mexican Luis E. Miramontes and Hungarian-Mexican George Rosenkranz, of the progestin norethisterone—which, unlike progesterone, remained effective when taken orally and was far stronger than the naturally occurring hormone. Djerassi's preparation was first administered as an oral contraceptive to animals by Gregory Goodwin Pincus and Min Chueh Chang and to women by John Rock.

In 1957, Djerassi became vice president of research at Syntex in Mexico City while on leave of absence from Wayne State. In 1960, he became a professor of chemistry at Stanford University, a position he held until 2002 but only part-time, as he never left industry. From 1968 until 1972, he also served as president of Syntex Research at Palo Alto.

The Syntex connection brought wealth to Djerassi. He bought a large tract of land in San Mateo County, California, and started a cattle ranch called SMIP. (Initially an acronym for "Syntex Made It Possible", other variants have been suggested since.) He also assembled a large art collection. His collection of works by Paul Klee was considered to be one of the most significant to be privately held. He arranged for his Klee collections to be donated to the Albertina in Vienna and the San Francisco Museum of Modern Art, effective on his death.

Throughout the 1960s and 1970s, Djerassi continued to do significant scientific work, as a professor in the department of chemistry at Stanford University, and as an entrepreneur. He pioneered novel physical research techniques for mass spectrometry and optical rotatory dispersion and applied them to the areas of organic chemistry and the life sciences. Focusing on the steroid hormones and alkaloids, he elucidated the structure of steroids, an area in which he published more than 1,200 papers. His scientific interests were wide-ranging, and his technological achievements include work in instrumentation, pharmaceuticals, insect control, the application of artificial intelligence in biomedical research, and the biology and chemistry of marine organisms.

In 1968, he started a new company, Zoecon, which focused on environmentally soft methods of pest control, using modified insect growth hormones to stop insects from metamorphosing from the larval stage to the pupal and adult stages. Zoecon was eventually acquired by Occidental Petroleum, which later sold it to Sandoz, now Novartis. Part of Zoecon survives in Dallas, Texas, making products to control fleas and other pests.

In 1965 at Stanford University, Nobel laureate Joshua Lederberg, computer scientist Edward Feigenbaum, and Djerassi devised the computer program DENDRAL (dendritic algorithm) for the elucidation of the molecular structure of unknown organic compounds taken from known groups of such compounds, such as the alkaloids and the steroids. This was a prototype for expert systems and one of the first uses of artificial intelligence in biomedical research.

Djerassi was a member of the Board of Sponsors of the Bulletin of the Atomic Scientists and was chairman of the Pharmanex Scientific Advisory Board.

== Publications ==
Djerassi published widely as a novelist, playwright and scientist. In 1985, he said: "I feel like I'd like to lead one more life. I'd like to leave a cultural imprint on society rather than just a technological benefit." He went on to write several novels in the "science-in-fiction" genre, including Cantor's Dilemma, in which he explored the ethics of modern scientific research through his protagonist, Dr. Cantor. He also wrote four autobiographies, the most recent of which, In Retrospect appeared in 2014. He wrote a number of plays, which have been performed and extensively translated. His book Chemistry in Theatre: Insufficiency, Phallacy or Both discusses the potential pedagogic value of using dialogic style and the plot structure of plays with special focus on chemistry.

=== Science-in-fiction ===
Djerassi wrote five novels, four of which he described as "science-in-fiction", fiction that portrays the lives of real scientists, with all their accomplishments, conflicts, and aspirations. The genre is also referred to as Lab lit.

In his first two novels, Cantor's Dilemma and Bourbaki Gambit, he shows how scientists work and think. In Cantor's Dilemma, there is the suspicion of scientific fraud; in Bourbaki Gambit the question of personal achievement stands in the center. In the third, Menachem's Seed, ICSI and the Pugwash organization are the main themes. In the last, NO, Djerassi shows how young scientists develop an idea as far as founding a company to market a product – something he himself did in the field of insecticides.

The topic of Djerassi's fifth novel, Marx Deceased, is the role of a writer's earlier bestsellers for the assessment of a new work – in contrast to the assessment of an anonymous work or one of a formerly unknown author. He also plays with this topic in Bourbaki Gambit.

=== Science-in-theatre ===
After his success with prose literature in the Science-in-Fiction genre, Djerassi started to write plays. Theatre, even more so than prose, seemed to fulfill his desire to work in a more "dialogical" environment than the monological natural sciences had allowed him to do. According to British director Andy Jordan, who has produced all of his plays in England, Djerassi's dramatic works are "not wholly or straightforwardly naturalistic or realistic […but] avowedly text-driven, where ideas, themes, words and language were majorly important, a fact I had always to be conscious of as the director."

Djerassi's first play, An Immaculate Misconception (1998), dealing with the in vitro fertilization procedure ICSI, was followed by two plays about priority struggles in the history of science, Oxygen (co-authored with Roald Hoffmann, 1999) and Calculus (2002), and a drama at the intersection of chemistry and art history, Phallacy (2004). Ego (2003, also produced under the title Three on a Couch), together with the docudrama Four Jews on Parnassus (2006, publ. 2008) and Foreplay (2010), are the only three dramatic pieces that do not deal with science-in-literature but rather carry the notion of intellectual competitiveness into literature, philosophy and the humanities. Taboos (2006), a complex play between reproductive, gender and political issues, returns to Djerassi's central concerns as a scientist; his 2012 play Insufficiency is a bitter satire of both the scientific community and academic environments. ICSI, sex in the age of mechanical reproduction (2002), was taken to theaters and also to classrooms as a pedagogic wordplay, in many countries, including Spain and Argentina (by collaboration with Dr Àgata Baizán and Alberto Diaz) where it opened the VIII Latinoamerican and Caribbean Biotechnology meeting REDBIO-Argentina 2013 and featured in universities and theaters.

As in his novels, Djerassi's plays incorporate the life and achievements of (sometimes famous) scientists as well as new scientific technologies. The science in his plays is always scientifically plausible, although the dramatic personae and locations are fictitious. By placing scientists and research into dramatic worlds, he raises critical questions about the sciences as cultural systems and looks into internal conflicts and contradictions in science and between scientists. The constant competition between them, the need for priority in new scientific discoveries even if the required speed necessitates risky and immoral means, as well as the problematic consequences of new discoveries are important topics of the plays.

Connected with many of these questions is the role of women in the sciences (including researchers' wives and female friends). Djerassi's plays recognize the special contributions women make as scientists and to science, both directly and indirectly. His female characters are usually depicted as strong and independent, proving a strong impact of feminist thinking on his work.

Djerassi's plays have found their way into theaters around the globe and have been translated into many European and Asian languages. Djerassi repeatedly revised his plays and some of them have different versions and multiple endings (especially An Immaculate Misconception: the nationalities of the main characters vary, also the endings). Where possible, Djerassi also cooperated with directors in the production of dramatic performances. All of his plays have been published in book form, many of them in a number of languages. Some of them can be downloaded from his website.

=== Poetry ===
Djerassi wrote numerous poems that were published in journals or anthologies. Some of the poems reflected his life as a chemist (e.g. Why are chemists not poets or The clock runs backwards), others his personal life (e.g. A Diary of Pique).

=== Non-fiction ===
- Optical Rotatory Dispersion, McGraw-Hill & Company, 1960.
- The Politics of Contraception
- Steroids Made it Possible
- The Pill, Pygmy Chimps, and Degas' Horse
- From the Lab into The World: A Pill for People, Pets, and Bugs
- Paul Klee: Masterpieces of the Djerassi Collection
- Dalla pillola alla penna
- This Man's Pill: Reflections on the 50th Birthday of the Pill
- In Retrospect : From the Pill to the Pen

=== Fiction ===
- Cantor's Dilemma, 1989
- The Bourbaki Gambit, 1994
- The Futurist and Other Stories
- How I Beat Coca-Cola and Other Tales of One-Upmanship
- Marx, Deceased. A Novel, 1996
- Menachem's Seed. A Novel, 1997
- NO. A Novel, 1998

=== Drama ===
- Chemistry in Theatre: Insufficiency, Phallacy or Both
- Foreplay: Hannah Arendt, the Two Adornos, and Walter Benjamin
- Four Jews on Parnassus
- An Immaculate Misconception: Sex in an Age of Mechanical Reproduction
  - L.A. Theatre Works
- Oxygen (with Roald Hoffmann, co-author)
- Newton's Darkness: Two Dramatic Views
- Sex in an Age of Technological Reproduction: ICSI and TABOOS translated to Spanish and brought to scene by Dr. Àgata Baizán

== Awards and honors ==
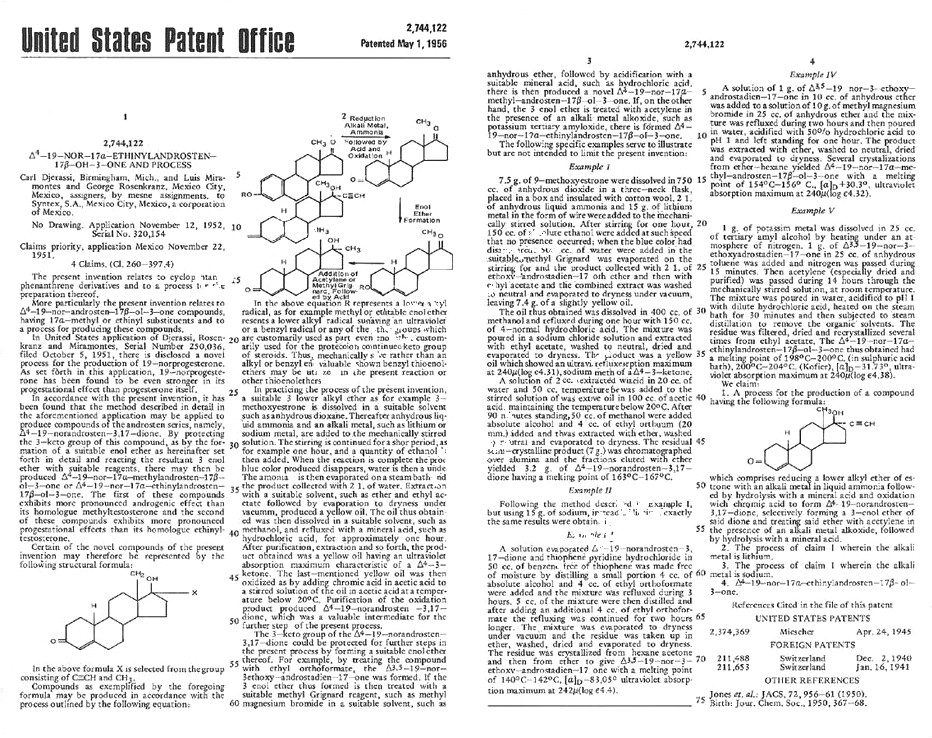
Patent of the first orally highly active progestin, which led to the development of the oral contraceptive, elected to the National Inventors Hall of Fame

Djerassi won numerous awards during his career including:

- Ernest Guenther Award in Chemistry and Natural Products by the American Chemical Society (1960)
- Scheele Award (1972)
- National Medal of Science (President of the United States of America, 1973) for his work on the contraceptive pill (The award was somewhat ironic in that his name at the time was on the infamous "Nixon's enemies list", compiled by Charles Colson and Richard Nixon. Djerassi learned this from an article in the San Francisco Examiner several months later.)
- Perkin Medal (1975)
- Inducted into the National Inventors Hall of Fame (1978)
- First recipient of the Wolf Prize, 1978
- National Medal of Technology (President of the United States of America, 1991) for "his broad technological contributions to solving environmental problems; and for his initiatives in developing novel, practical approaches to insect control products that are biodegradable and harmless"
- Golden Plate Award of the American Academy of Achievement (1980)
- Priestley Medal (American Chemical Society, 1992)
- Willard Gibbs Award (Chicago Section of the American Chemical Society, 1997)
- Austrian Cross of Honour for Science and Art, 1st class (1999)
- Othmer Gold Medal (2000)
- Prize of the German Chemical Society for Writers (2001)
- Grand Gold Medal for services to the province of Lower Austria (2002)
- Gold Medal of the capital Vienna (2002)
- Grand Cross of the Order of Merit of the Federal Republic of Germany (2003)
- Erasmus Medal of the Academia Europaea (2003)
- American Institute of Chemists Gold Medal (2004)
- Lichtenberg Medal of the Göttingen Academy of Sciences (2005)
- Premio letterario Serono in Rome (2005)
- An Austrian postage stamp with Djerassi's portrait was issued to mark his 80th birthday (2005) The Austrian government also sent him a new Austrian passport.
- Grand Decoration of Honour in Silver for Services to the Republic of Austria (2008)
- Honorary doctorate from the faculty of humanities of the Technical University of Dortmund for his literary work (as 21 honorary doctorate) (2009)
- Alecrin Prize (2009, Vigo, Spain)
- Djerassi Glacier on Brabant Island in Antarctica is named after Carl Djerassi (2009).
- Foreign Member of the Royal Society (2010)
- Edinburgh Medal (2011)
- Honorary doctorate from the Faculty of Chemistry and Geosciences, Heidelberg University (2011)
- Honorary doctorate from the Porto University (2011)
- Honorary doctorate from the University of Vienna (2012)
- Honorary doctorate from the Medical University of Vienna (2012)
- Honorary doctorate from the University of Applied Arts, Vienna (2013)
- Honorary doctorate from the Sigmund Freud University, Vienna (2013)
- Honorary doctorate from the American University in Bulgaria (2013)
- Honorary doctorate from the University of Innsbruck (2014)
- Djerassiplatz, the site of the University of Vienna Biology Building is named after him.

An award that eluded Djerassi was the Nobel Prize, where he is considered one of the more notable "snubs" by the Nobel Committee.

== Personal life ==
Djerassi described himself as a "Jewish atheist".

Djerassi was married three times and had two children. He and Virginia Jeremiah were married in 1943 and divorced in 1950. Djerassi married writer Norma Lundholm (1917–2006) later that year. They had two children together, and were divorced in 1976. One year after his second divorce, Djerassi began a relationship with Diane Middlebrook, a Stanford University professor of English and biographer. In 1985, they were married and they lived between San Francisco and London, until her death on December 15, 2007, due to cancer.

On July 5, 1978, Djerassi's daughter Pamela, an artist (born 1950; from his second marriage, to Norma Lundholm), committed suicide, which is described in his autobiography. With Middlebrook's help, Djerassi then considered how he could help living artists, rather than collecting works of dead ones. He visited existing artist colonies, such as Yaddo and MacDowell, and decided to create his own, the Djerassi Resident Artists Program. He closed his cattle ranch and converted the barn and houses to residential and work space for artists. He and his wife moved to a high rise in San Francisco that they had renovated.

Carl Djerassi died on January 30, 2015, at the age of 91, from complications of liver and bone cancer.
