= Lew Sarett =

Lew R. Sarett (May 16, 1888 – August 17, 1954) was an American educator, poet and outdoorsman. He taught at the University of Illinois (1912–1920) and later Northwestern University (1920–1953), and published six poetry collections, including:

- Many Many Moons (1920)
- The Box of God (1922)
- Slow Smoke (1925)
