= Oklahoma State University College of Agricultural Sciences and Natural Resources =

Agricultural science school of Oklahoma State University

Coordinates: 36°07′26″N 97°04′21″W

The Oklahoma State University Ferguson College of Agriculture (previously Oklahoma State University College of Agricultural Sciences and Natural Resources (CASNR ) )serves as the agricultural component of OSU-Stillwater in Stillwater, Oklahoma and operates within the university's Division of Agricultural Sciences and Natural Resources (DASNR). Agriculture has been a part of Oklahoma State University since the school's inception in 1890, when it was known as Oklahoma Agricultural & Mechanical College. Today the College of Agricultural Sciences and Natural Resources has emerged as one of the top agricultural institutions amongst Big 12 Conference schools and throughout the United States.

Oklahoma State operates a network of agricultural experiment stations and the Oklahoma Cooperative Extension Service, which has a presence in all 77 counties throughout the state of Oklahoma. OSU experiment stations cover Oklahoma's diverse terrain, from the dense forests of McCurtain County to the prairie and plains of western Oklahoma. Experiment stations currently operate in the Oklahoma cities of Stillwater, Goodwell, Woodward, Bessie, Lahoma, Haskell, Perkins, Chickasha, Fort Cobb, Altus, Mangum, Tipton, Lane, Bixby, and Idabel.

== Academic programs ==
- Agricultural Economics
- Agricultural Education, Communications, and Leadership
- Animal Science
- Biochemistry and Molecular Biology
- Biosystems and Agricultural Engineering
- Entomology and Plant Pathology
- Environmental Sciences
- Natural Resource Ecology and Management
- Food Science
- Horticulture and Landscape Architecture
- Plant and Soil Sciences
