= James Flack Norris =

American chemist

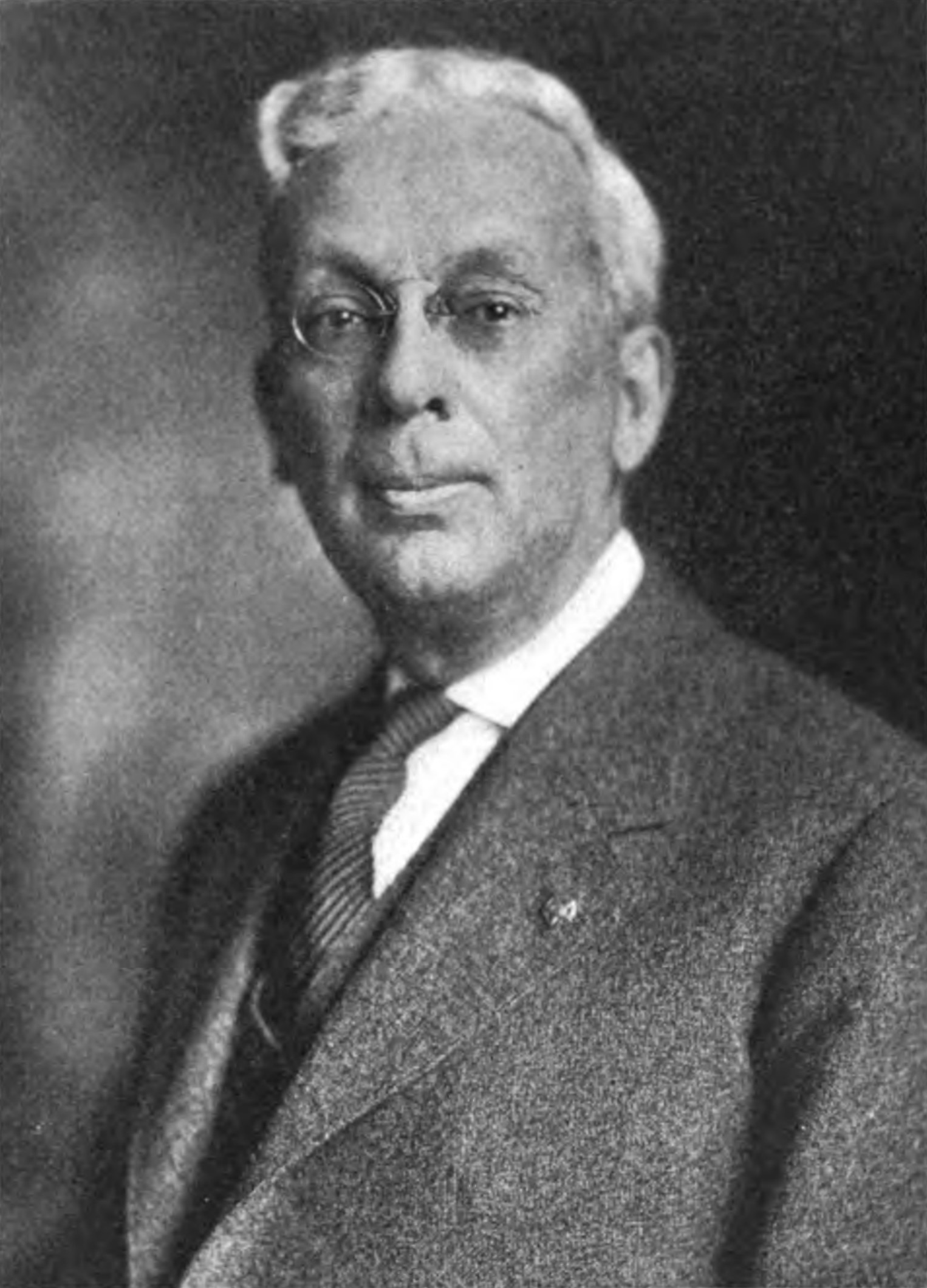
Norris in a 1924 publication

James Flack Norris (January 20, 1871 – August 3, 1940) was an American chemist.

== Biography ==
Born in Baltimore, Maryland, to a Methodist minister, Norris was educated in Baltimore and Washington, D.C., where he graduated from Central High School in 1887. He then attended Johns Hopkins University, where he graduated with an A.B. in chemistry. After graduating in 1892, Norris remained at the university to work as a fellow until 1895, when he was awarded his Ph.D. and became an academic at the Massachusetts Institute of Technology (MIT). He left MIT in 1904 to become the first professor of chemistry at the newly formed Simmons College. In 1915, Norris became a professor of chemistry at Vanderbilt University before returning to MIT in 1916 to take up the position of professor of organic chemistry and, after its creation in 1926, the first director of MIT's Research Laboratory of Organic Chemistry.

During World War I, Norris served as a lieutenant colonel in the U.S. Army Chemical Warfare Service and commanded their operations in England. He headed war gas attack investigations and offensive chemical research. After the armistice, he led investigation of war gas manufacturing in German chemical plants until his release from active duty in 1919.

In 1906, Norris was named a fellow of the American Association for the Advancement of Science. In 1907, he was elected to the American Academy of Arts and Sciences. In 1929, Norris was conferred an honorary Sc.D. degree by Bowdoin College. In 1937, he received the American Institute of Chemists Gold Medal.

Outside of his work as an academic, Norris served as president of the American Chemical Society from 1925 to 1926 and as vice-president of the International Union of Pure and Applied Chemistry (IUPAC) from 1925 to 1928.

== Legacy ==
The James Flack Norris Award is named in his honour.

== Personal ==
Norris was the son of Rev. Richard Norris and Sarah Amanda (Baker) Norris. He had four older and four younger siblings.

On February 4, 1902, Norris married Anne Bent Chamberlin. They did not have any children.

Norris died in the Phillips House at Massachusetts General Hospital in Boston late in the evening of August 3, 1940. He was interred at Mount Auburn Cemetery in Cambridge.

== Bibliography ==
- Roberts, John D. (1974). James Flack Norris: A Biographical Memoir (PDF). National Academy of Sciences.
