= American Institute of Chemists =

Scientific society for chemists in the United States

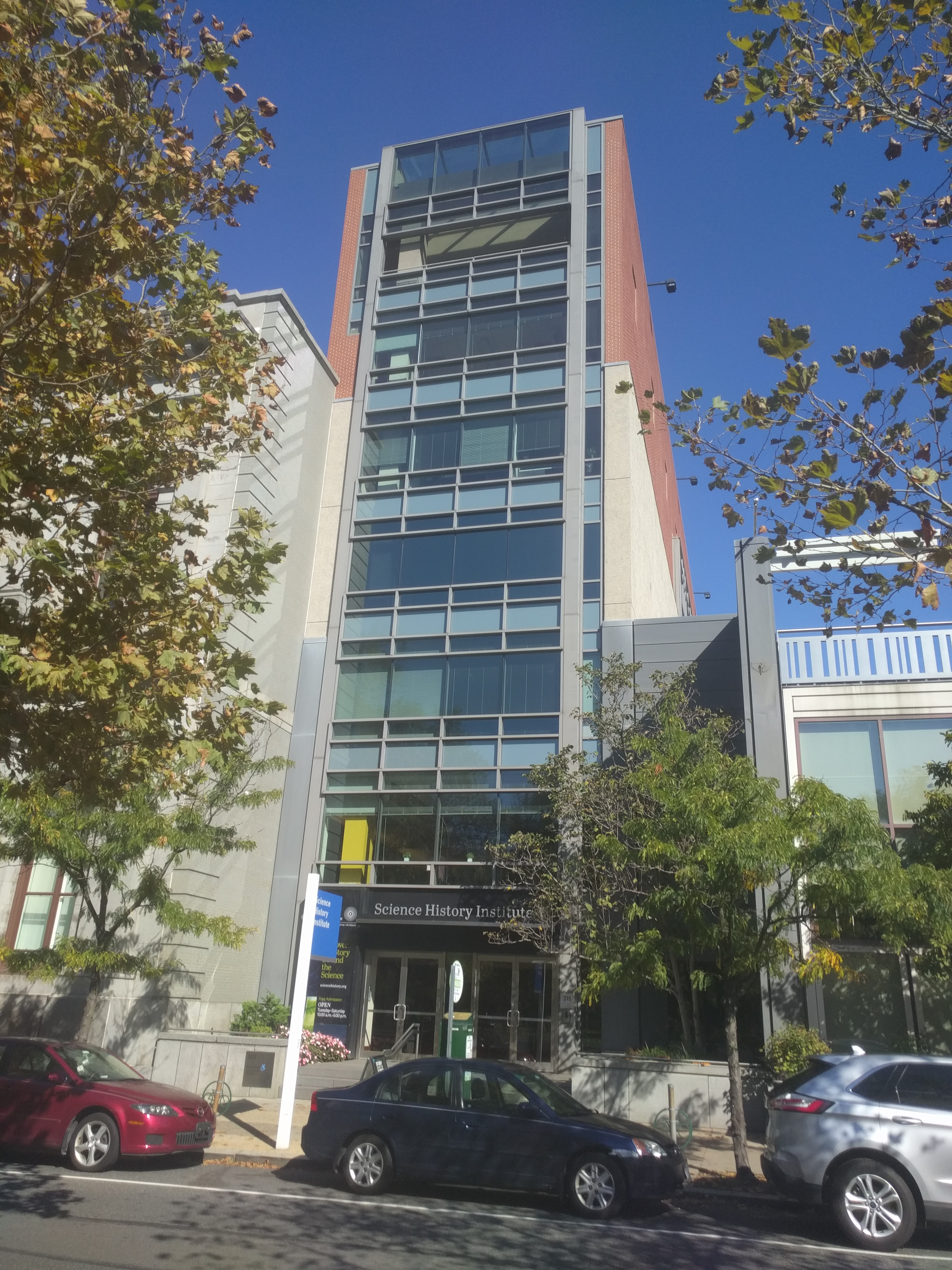
- Formation: 1923; 103 years ago
- Location: Philadelphia, United States
- Publication: The Chemist
- Website: www.theaic.org

The American Institute of Chemists (AIC) is an organization founded in 1923 with the goal of advancing the chemistry profession in the United States. The institute is known for its yearly awards recognizing contributions of individuals in this field of work.

The American Institute of Chemists Gold Medal, given since 1926, is the institute's highest award and is awarded annually to a person who has promoted activity of service to the science or profession of chemist or chemical engineer in the United States of America.

The Chemical Pioneer Award, first given in 1966, recognizes chemists or chemical engineers who have made outstanding contributions to advances in chemistry or the chemical profession.

Former Presidents of the Institute include Gustav Egloff who served from 1942 to 1946.

== See also ==
- American Chemical Society
- Royal Society of Chemistry
