= Carl Shipp Marvel =

American polymer chemist (1894–1988)

- Born: September 11, 1894; Waynesville, Illinois
- Died: January 4, 1988 (aged 93); Tucson, Arizona
- Education: Illinois Wesleyan University, University of Illinois
- Known for: Polymer Chemistry
- Awards: Willard Gibbs Award (1950); Priestley Medal (1956); Perkin Medal (1965); National Medal of Science (1986)
- Scientific career
- Fields: Organic chemistry
- Workplaces: University of Illinois, University of Arizona
- Thesis: A study of the possible asymmetry of the aliphatic diazo compounds (1920)
- Doctoral advisor: William A. Noyes
- Doctoral students: H. E. Carter; John Stille

Carl Shipp "Speed" Marvel (September 11, 1894 – January 4, 1988) was an American chemist who specialized in polymer chemistry. He made important contributions to U.S. synthetic rubber program during World War II, and later worked at developing polybenzimidazoles, temperature-resistant polymers that are used in the aerospace industry, in fire-fighting equipment, and as a replacement for asbestos. He has been described as "one of the world's outstanding organic chemists" and received numerous awards, including the 1956 Priestley Medal and the 1986 National Medal of Science, presented by President Ronald Reagan.

== Early life and education ==
Carl Shipp Marvel was born on September 11, 1894, in Waynesville, Illinois, U.S., to farmers John Thomas Marvel and Mary Lucy Wasson Marvel. An uncle urged him to study chemistry. Marvel attended Illinois Wesleyan University from 1911 to 1915. He graduated with an A.B. and M.S. in chemistry. On the recommendation of his advisor, Alfred W. Homberger, Marvel obtained a $250 scholarship to the University of Illinois.

Marvel had to take extra classes to "catch up" during his first year at University of Illinois. He obtained the nickname "Speed" early on in his career as a chemist from his habit of rushing to breakfast after studying all night. While at Illinois, Marvel became a friend of fellow student Wallace Carothers. Marvel received his M.A. in Chemistry from the University of Illinois in 1916.

Marvel's studies were interrupted by World War I. As the war cut off previous sources of supply, it became difficult to obtain many of the chemicals used in synthetic organic chemistry and related industrial processes. Clarence Derick set up the Organic Chemical Manufactures unit at Illinois to make and sell chemicals that had previously been imported from Germany. From 1916 to 1919 Marvel worked at the production unit under Roger Adams. His work in the Organic Chemical Manufactures unit gave him extensive experience in chemical preparation. Students were required to take careful notebook records of each preparation, including the cost of chemicals, apparatus, and the time needed. Marvel was known for his ability to modify poor procedures to make them more effective, and to describe procedures so that others could follow them. Many of these laboratory procedures were later published, first as pamphlets on Organic Chemical Reagents, by Roger Adams, O. Kamm, and C. S. Marvel, and later in the journal Organic Syntheses.

Marvel was a member of Tau Kappa Epsilon. He was initiated into Alpha Chi Sigma at the Zeta chapter, University of Illinois, in 1918.

In 1919, Marvel returned to graduate study full-time, supported by a fellowship from DuPont. Marvel received his Ph.D. in Chemistry from the University of Illinois in 1920, working with department head William Albert Noyes. His thesis was A Study of the Possible Asymmetry of Aliphatic Diazo Compounds.

== University of Illinois ==
Marvel joined the Department of Chemistry at the University of Illinois as an instructor, in 1920. He was promoted to associate in 1921, an assistant professor in 1923, an associate professor in 1927, and to Professor of Organic Chemistry in 1930. Until 1940, he also supervised the Organic Chemical Manufactures unit, which became a summer program in which students synthesized difficult-to-obtain specialty chemicals. From 1953 to 1961, Marvel was a research professor in the Department of Chemistry.

Marvel's early research was in classical organic chemistry. He was an enthusiastic contributor to Organic Syntheses. Approximately 20% of the 264 preparations in Collective Volume I of Organic Syntheses were either written or checked by Marvel.

Marvel worked with a wide variety of compounds, including dialkyl mercury, hexa-substituted ethanes, dienynes, alkyl lithium and Grignard reagents, quaternary phosphonium, and ammonium compounds, preparing them and investigating their reactions. He developed organic chemical reagents to be used in the characterization, identification, and analysis of chemical compounds. Much of this research was carried out before techniques such as Infrared spectroscopy or Mass spectrometry were developed: for example, Marvel's exploration of intermolecular hydrogen bonding relied on studying solubilities and heats of mixing.

He soon moved into polymer chemistry, again working on synthesis methods and structure determination. Using techniques such as determinations of elemental analysis, average molecular weight, end-group analysis, and examination of products, Marvel demonstrated a chemical methodology for establishing the principal structural features of polymers. With his ability to improvise and refine new techniques, he made "major fundamental contributions" to the field of polymer science for which he has been recognized as the "father" of synthetic polymer chemistry.

Beginning in 1933, Marvel began studying olefin/sulfur dioxide polymers, determining their structure and examining the effects of initiators such as peroxide or ultraviolet light on polymerization reactions. Examining vinyl polymers in 1937, Marvel was able to demonstrate that polymers prepared from polyvinyl chloride tended to form a head-to-tail structure with chlorine atoms on alternate carbon atoms, confirming the structural ideas of Hermann Staudinger, rather than a head-to-head structure which chlorine atoms on adjacent carbon atoms. This work led in turn to the preparation and polymerization of new monomers. For his work on SO_{2}, α-olefins and vinyl polymers, Marvel received the William H. Nichols Medal from the American Chemical Society in 1944. In the early forties he was one of the first scientists to use optically active monomers and optically active initiators to examine properties of stereoregular polymers.

=== DuPont Central Research ===
In 1928, Marvel was recommended by Roger Adams as a consultant for DuPont Central Research. In the course of nearly 60 years, Marvel gave 19,000 individual consultations. When asked to test the finding of English chemist F. E. Matthews that polysulfones could be formed by the reaction of sulfur dioxide and ethylene, Marvel confirmed the finding, using cyclohexene rather than ethylene. He was a close friend as well as a consultant to Wallace Carothers, who was carrying out groundbreaking work on nylon and neoprene at Dupont. Marvel also consulted with Ray C. Houtz, when Houtz was developing a synthetic fiber made from polyacrylonitrile, Orlon.

=== United States Rubber Reserve ===
Marvel participated heavily in the U.S. synthetic rubber program when supplies of natural rubber were disrupted during World War II. The availability of rubber was essential to the war effort. Beginning in September 1940, Marvel worked with Section C-2, Synthetic Problems, of Division B of the National Defense Research Committee. In 1941 and 1942 he was chairman of Section B–3, Synthetic, Analytical, and Inorganic Problems, of the National Defense Research Committee. Between 1942 and 1945 he headed a group of up to 100 chemists at different institutions across the United States for the U.S. Rubber Reserve Corporation. His work at Illinois on the low-temperature copolymerization of butadiene and styrene was important to the successful commercial production of synthetic rubber. His group identified thiol as a key to the polymerization process, and targeted polyunsaturated fatty acids, present in soaps used as emulsifiers, as an ingredient that was interfering with polymerization reactions.

In 1946 Marvel went to Germany as one of a technical intelligence team, to report on the state of German rubber technology. They found that German scientists were using a redox polymerization process at 5 °C (41 °F), considerably lower than previous processes. Marvel and his group developed this idea further, creating a cold rubber process for American industry. With their new process, polymerization could be completed in only seven hours.

As a result of his wartime work, Marvel received the President's Certificate of Merit for Civilians in World War II.

=== Teaching ===
Marvel is credited, with Roger Adams and Reynold C. Fuson, with making the organic chemistry program at Illinois "preeminent in the United States". As an instructor, Marvel saw the importance of working on essential problems. He also emphasized "that the essential product of academic research was the students." Marvel supervised 176 successful doctoral students, and at least 150 postdoctoral students during his career. His students included H. E. Carter, Wallace Carothers, George Graves, William J. Sparks, Samuel M. McElvain, Arnold Beckman, and future Nobel Laureates Vincent du Vigneaud and Edwin G. Krebs.

In 1961 Marvel formally "retired" from Illinois, but continued to be a research professor Emeritus from 1961 to 1988. In 1963, he was awarded an Honorary D. Sc. degree from the University of Illinois.

== University of Arizona ==
From 1961 to 1988 Marvel also held the position of Professor in the Department of Chemistry at the University of Arizona. At Arizona, Marvel continued work which he had begun at Illinois, the study of high temperature polymers.

=== High temperature polymers ===
Marvel made important advances in the development of high temperature polymers, including polybenzimidazoles and ladder polymers, using techniques of polyaddition and cyclopolymerization.

Marvel was contacted by Wright Patterson Air Force Base in the 1950s, because the U.S. Air Force needed a material suitable for drogue parachutes. They needed a material that would retain its strength when subjected to extremely high temperatures. Researching high-temperature stable polymers, Marvel was the first to synthesize Polybenzimidazole (PBI), a condensation polymer with aromatic and heteroaromatic repeating units. He then worked with Herward Vogel, first at the University of Illinois and later at the University of Arizona, to improve the quality of the polymer and develop Polybenzimidazole fiber. Their best PBI was both nonflammable and stable at temperatures of up to 600 °C. They registered patents for high molecular weight condensation polymers in the 1960s. Because of its thermal and oxidative stability PBI was adopted by NASA in the 1960s for use in aerospace and defense applications. In 1978, PBI began to be used in United States fire service equipment.

Marvel also proposed the development of "ladder molecules" (ladder polymers), next generation polymers that would be even more stable than polybenzimidazoles. Marvel had taken the first steps towards a process for creating ladder-type polymers as early as 1938, when he attempted the cyclization of poly(methyl vinyl ketone). In the 1950s, he outlined a precursor approach to the creation of poly(para-phenylene) (PPP), a particularly difficult process. Marvel's approach contained the key elements of solutions which would not be developed for another thirty years: chain-growth polymerization of a cyclohexadiene monomer, and its subsequent aromatization. His work is therefore considered "an important milestone in the history of PPP synthesis."

Throughout the 1960s and 1970s he continued to work as a principal contributor to the U.S. Air Force program on high temperature polymer synthesis, including the synthesis of thermally stable ladder or partial ladder polypyrrolones. For his work Marvel was awarded a Distinguished Service Award (1966) by the U.S. Air Force Materials Laboratory and an Award for Outstanding Achievement (1966) by the Air Force Systems Command.

He officially "retired" as a research professor at the University of Arizona in 1978, but still carried on some research, with the help of postdoctoral students, until his death in 1988. The University of Arizona named the "Carl S. Marvel Laboratories of Chemistry" at 1213 E South Campus, Tucson, AZ, in his honor. Marvel Hall, a conference room in the American Chemical Society Building in Washington, D.C., is also named for him.

== Publications ==
Dr. Marvel published nearly 500 articles in scientific journals worldwide, and four books including Introduction to the Organic Chemistry of High Polymers. He served on the editorial board of journals including Macromolecules, the Journal of Organic Chemistry, the Journal of the American Chemical Society, and the Journal of Polymer Science. He also held 52 patents.

An avid birdwatcher throughout his life, Marvel's publications include papers on bird-watching, such as "The Unusual Feeding Habits of the Cape May Warbler" (1948) and "The Blue Grosbeck in Western Ontario" (1950).

== Honors and awards ==
- 1938 Elected to the National Academy of Sciences
- 1944 William H. Nichols Medal, American Chemical Society
- 1945 President of the American Chemical Society
- 1945 Elected to the American Philosophical Society
- 1950 Willard Gibbs Medal, American Chemical Society
- 1955 American Institute of Chemists Gold Medal
- 1956 Priestley Medal, American Chemical Society
- 1960 Elected to the American Academy of Arts and Sciences
- 1964 First recipient, ACS Award in Polymer Chemistry
- 1964 International Award, Society of Plastics Engineers
- 1965 Perkin Medal, American Section of the Society of Chemical Industry
- 1966 Distinguished Service Award, U.S. Air Force Materials Laboratory
- 1966 Award for Outstanding Achievement, Air Force Systems Command
- 1967 Chemical Pioneer Award, American Institute of Chemistry
- 1986 National Medal of Science, presented by President Ronald Reagan
- 1988 Inducted into the Alpha Chi Sigma Hall of Fame.

== Family ==
Carl Marvel married Alberta Hughes on December 26, 1933. They had two children, Mary Catharine (1935 - 2017) and John Thomas Marvel (1938 -2010). Carl Marvel died on January 4, 1988. John Thomas Marvel married Joyce Strand. They had three sons, Scott Thomas, Chris Andrew and Carl Randall Marvel. Scott Thomas Marvel has one daughter, Estelle Marvel. Carl Randall Marvel married Jennifer Price. They had two children, Christian Reed and Brooke Marie Marvel.
