= George G. Shor =

American geophysicist

- George Shor in 1970.
- Born: George G. Shor Jr. June 8, 1923; New York City, New York
- Died: July 3, 2009 (aged 86); La Jolla, California, U.S.
- Education: California Institute of Technology (BS, MS, PhD)
- Spouse: Betty Shor
- Scientific career
- Fields: Geophysics
- Workplaces: Scripps Institution of Oceanography
- Thesis: Crustal Structure and Reflections from the Mohorovičić Discontinuity in Southern California (1954)
- Doctoral advisor: Charles Richter

George G. Shor Jr. (June 8, 1923 – July 3, 2009) was an American marine geophysicist. His entire career was at the Scripps Institution of Oceanography in La Jolla, California. He began his career working with the Mohole Project, an ambitious project that attempted to drill to the Mohorovičić discontinuity from deep-ocean regions.

== Early life and education ==
Shor was born in New York City on June 8, 1923. After receiving his degree in mechanical engineering from the California Institute of Technology (Caltech) in 1944, Shor joined the United States Naval Reserve and served in World War II as an electronics officer and communications officer. He remained with the Naval Reserve for most of his career. Shor returned to Caltech in 1946 to obtain a master's degree in geophysics in 1948. After a few years working at oil exploration in Texas, Shor returned again to Caltech in 1951 for his doctoral work. He studied seismology and geology under Charles Richter, obtaining his degree in 1954. Shor's doctoral work employed explosive shots to make measurements of the Mohorovičić discontinuity, the boundary layer between the Earth's crust and mantle.

Shor began work as an assistant research geophysicist at the Marine Physical Laboratory at the Scripps Institution of Oceanography in 1953.

Shor married Elizabeth (Betty) Noble in 1950. Betty Shor became a noted historian for Scripps.

== Career at Scripps ==
=== Work with Russell Raitt ===
At Scripps Shor's initial mentor and collaborator was Russell Raitt at the Marine Physical Laboratory. The field work involved using explosives and air guns to conduct refraction and reflection studies of the Earth's structure below the seafloor. Their research established facts about sea floor geophysics that were the precursors to the theory of plate tectonics.

=== Project Mohole ===
Project Mohole aimed to obtain a sample of the Mohorovičić discontinuity (Moho) by drilling from a deep-ocean region. Below continents the discontinuity is too deep to be reached by drilling, but below deep-ocean regions it is shallower. Nevertheless, deep-ocean drilling had never before been successful, and the project would have to drill an additional 3–6 miles below the sea floor to reach the Moho. The project was initially led by a group of scientists called the American Miscellaneous Society with funding from the National Science Foundation. The group included Walter Munk and Roger Revelle at Scripps.

After the project won an initial grant for exploratory study in 1958, Shor became involved because of his recent work on seismic measurements of the Moho discontinuity. Indeed, he was able to suggest the first suitable drilling site near Guadalupe Island, Mexico. Shor served as a principal investigator for the project. He and Raitt contributed to several Mohole committees and led expeditions to the Hawaiian Islands to determine the best drilling location for the project. The project suffered from political and scientific opposition, mismanagement, and cost overruns. The U.S. House of Representatives defunded it in 1966.

=== Scripps expeditions ===
Throughout his career at Scripps, Shor served as chief scientist on many research expeditions worldwide, beginning with geophysical expeditions to the Gulf of Alaska. He conducted the first expedition to the Indian Ocean by Scripps in 1960. From 1971 to 1992 he was frequently accompanied by his wife Betty on expeditions; she was an active participant of the cruises.

=== California Sea Grant Program ===
Shor helped to establish the California Sea Grant program in the 1960s, headquartered at Scripps. The program, which supported a great many studies on marine subjects within California, involved a number of California universities. Shor served as its manager from 1969 to 1973.

=== UNOLS – The University-National Oceanographic Laboratory System ===
From 1968 to 1991, Shor was associate director of Scripps for coordinating the activities of Scripps' research fleet, scheduling voyages and allocating resources. He also helped create and served on the University-National Oceanographic Laboratory System (UNOLS), which coordinates operations of research ships throughout the world.

== Personal life ==
Shor was married to Scripps historian Betty Shor for 59 years. They had a daughter and two sons.

According to Shor's son Don, Shor's father's middle name was Gershon, but Shor's mother didn't like the name so gave her son only the letter G as a middle name.

He retired from the U.S. Naval Reserve with the rank of commander in 1983.

Shor retired from Scripps in 1991, and he and his wife developed an interest in bamboo as a structural material for flooring, furniture and other applications. He was an active member of the American Bamboo Society for many years.

Shor died on July 3, 2009, age 86, at his home in La Jolla, California from complications following several strokes. Betty Shor died on October 13, 2013.
