= Louis Allamandola =

American space scientist

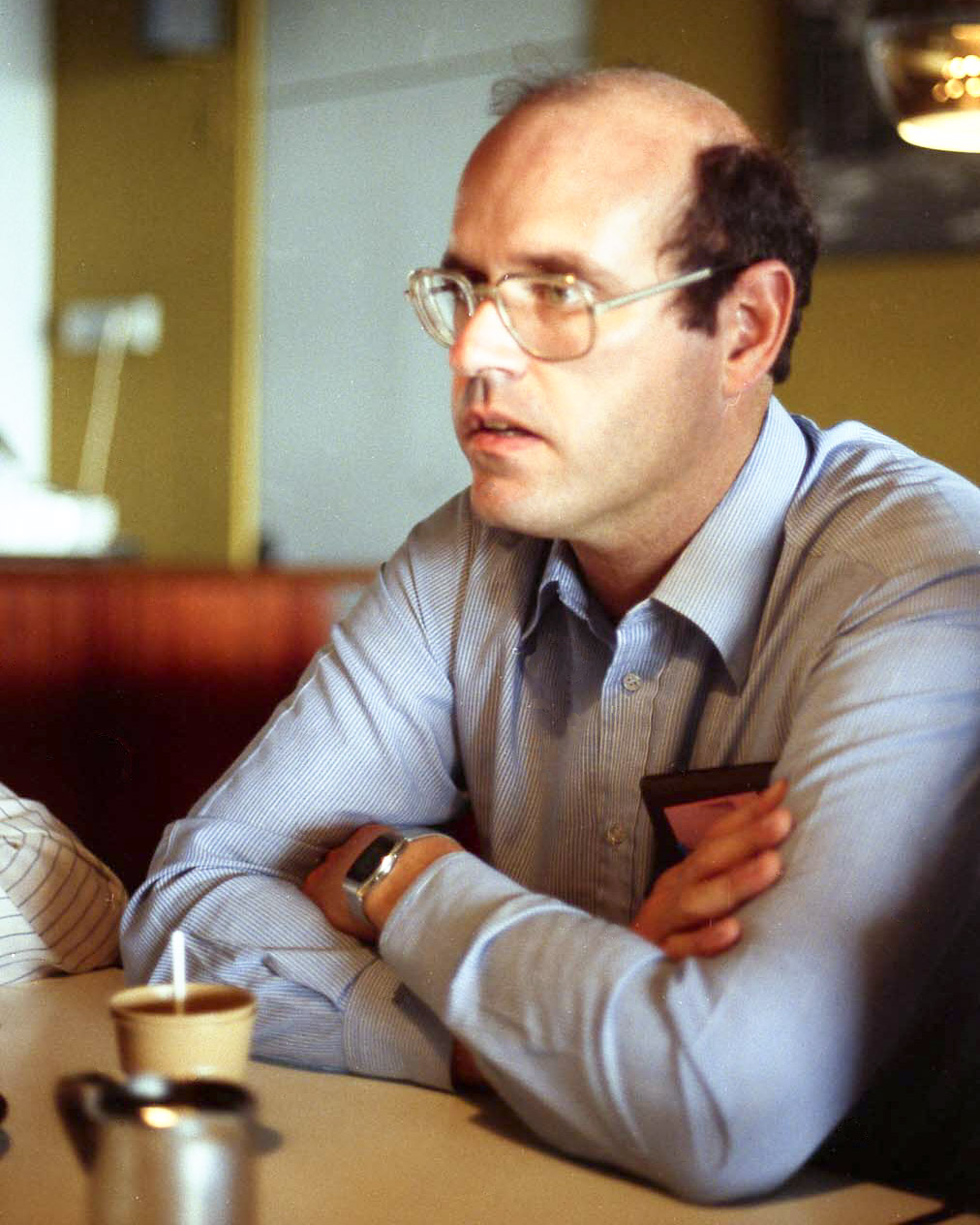
- Lou Allamandola at Leiden University in the early 1980s
- Education: Saint Peter's College; University of California at Berkeley
- Scientific career
- Fields: Astrophysics

Louis Allamandola is an American space scientist. He is the founder and director of NASA's Astrophysics & Astrochemistry Laboratory, and an Elected Fellow of American Association for the Advancement of Science.

He studied chemistry at St. Peter's College in Jersey City, New Jersey. He was trained in low temperature spectroscopic techniques under the tutelage of Professor G. C. Pimentel at the University of California at Berkeley. He has been based at the Ames Research Center for 35 years. His research provides an explanation to the origin and explanation of unidentified Infrared emission bands seen in space.

== Awards ==
Allamandola has been a co-author for two papers that won a H. Julian Allen Award, an annual award given to published scientific papers written principally by researchers at Ames. "Polycyclic Aromatic Hydrocarbons and the Unidentified Infrared Emission Bands: Auto Exhaust Along the Milky Way!" won in 1986, and "UV Irradiation of Polycyclic Aromatic Hydrocarbons in Ices: Production of Alcohols, Quinones, and Ethers" in 2007.
