= Edward Franklin =

Edward Franklin may refer to:

- Edward C. Franklin (1928–1982), American immunologist and physician
- Edward Curtis Franklin (1862–1937), American chemist
