= Samuel E. Sheppard =

British chemist (1882–1948)

- Born: 29 July 1882; Hither Green, Kent, England
- Died: 29 September 1948 (aged 66); Rochester, New York, U.S.
- Education: University College London (BS, DSc)
- Spouse: Eveline Lucy Ground (m. 1912)
- Children: 1
- Awards: William H. Nichols Medal (1930)
- Scientific career
- Workplaces: Kodak

Samuel Edward Sheppard (29 July 1882 – 29 September 1948) was a British chemist. Obtaining his bachelor and doctoral degrees from University College London, he collaborated with schoolmate Kenneth Mees and, at the latter's offer, joined Kodak's Rochester, New York research laboratory, where he specialized in gelatin chemistry and served as assistant director of research from 1924 until his retirement in 1948. A scientist of photography, his work at Kodak contributed to the development of higher-speed film. He also published several books and nearly two hundred scientific papers, and won several awards including the 1928 Royal Photographic Society Progress Medal and 1930 William H. Nichols Medal.

== Early life and education ==
Samuel Edward Sheppard was born on 29 July 1882 in Hither Green, Kent, the son of Samuel Sheppard, a market gardener, and Emily Mary Taplin. He attended preparatory school at Deal College in Kent, and then entered St Dunstan's College in Catford.

Sheppard entered University College London in 1900, studying under William Ramsay, and received the Bachelor of Science in chemistry in 1903; his bachelor thesis drew on the collaborative work of Hurter and Driffield and specialized in the theory behind photographic processing. Sheppard obtained a DSc in chemistry at UCL in 1906, with the thesis expanding on his existing bachelor studies.

In 1907, Sheppard began studying at Marburg University on a 1851 Research Fellowship under Franz Richarz and Karl Schaum. At Marburg, he studied the color-sensitizing aspects of dyes like pinacyanol through a spectrophotometer, expanding on Benno Homolka's discover of the red desensitizer. During the rest of his 1851 Research Fellowship time, he studied colloid chemistry under Victor Henri at the University of Paris. He also studied advanced microscopy in Jena.

== Academic career ==
After receiving his bachelor's degree, Sheppard set up a chemical laboratory at home, with he and Kenneth Mees (a classmate from St. Dunstan's and UCL) co-publishing several papers. Following Sheppard's 1910 return from his continental Europe studies, the duo started working at Henry Wainwright and Frederick Wratten's firm Wratten & Wainwright, before Sheppard went to the University of Cambridge School of Agriculture the next year to study the chemistry of wheat flour gluten. He also published two books around this time: Investigations on the Theory of the Photographic Process (1907), a republication of Mees and Sheppard's doctoral research, and Photo-chemistry (1914).

In 1913, Sheppard accepted Mees' offer to join Kodak's research laboratory (where Mees was head) in Rochester, New York, researching colloid and physical chemistry and specializing in the chemistry of gelatin (an essential component in the widespread gelatin silver print). His early actions at Kodak included helping conceive fuel made from coal and resin soaps. Positions held at Kodak include head of the physical, inorganic, and analytical chemistry department (1920) and assistant director of research (1924-1948).

Following the First World War, Sheppard started studying silver emulsions, eventually leading up to improvements on measurement of silver grains inside them, as well as discovery of a positive correlation between grain size and film speed. Another discovery of Sheppard that allowed for higher-speed film showed that sulfur could be concentrated into gelatin by bioaccumulation through the consumption of wild mustard plants by cattle. Other fields of photographic theory he covered included photographic processing, photovoltaics, and the concentration speck hypothesis. He published two books within Kodak's photography theory book series: Silver Bromide Grain of Photographic Emulsion (1921), the inaugural volume which he wrote with A. P. H. Trivelli, and Gelatin in Photography (1923), the third volume.

Outside of photography theory, Sheppard helped Kodak develop a formula for electroplating rubber, which Elizabeth Noble Shor later called "the basis for a new industry", as well as their X-ray screens, organizing a dedicated department in the process. His studies on gelatin also led to easier methods of reproducing that material in laboratories. Overall, he wrote nearly two hundred scientific papers throughout his career.

== Awards ==
Sheppard was appointed honorary fellow of the Royal Photographic Society in 1926, and was their 1928 Hurter & Driffield Memorial Lecturer. He later received the RPS' 1928 Progress Medal, as well as the Swedish Photographic Society's 1929 Adelsköld Medal. In March 1930, he became a recipient of the William H. Nichols Medal. TIME called him "a scientist so precise that he frequently lies prone to sight for his golf putts". Shor called his work "fundamental to the theory of the photographic processes", noting that he "placed the field of photography on a much more scientific footing".
