= George C. Pimentel =

Inventor of the chemical laser (1922–1989)

- Born: May 2, 1922; Rolinda, California, US
- Died: June 18, 1989 (aged 67); Kensington, California, US
- Education: University of California, Los Angeles (B.S. 1943); University of California, Berkeley (Ph.D. 1949)
- Known for: Chemical laser, matrix isolation, infrared spectroscopy of MARS and chemical education
- Scientific career
- Fields: Chemist
- Workplaces: University of California, Berkeley
- Thesis: I. Spectroscopic study of two Boranes / II. Thermocouples involving superconductors (1949)
- Doctoral advisor: Kenneth S. Pitzer
- Doctoral students: John D. Baldeschwieler; Mario Molina; William Klemperer; Vicki Grassian; Geraldine L. Richmond; Lester Andrews

George Claude Pimentel (May 2, 1922 – June 18, 1989) was a preeminent chemist and researcher, the inventor of the chemical laser, who was also dedicated to science education and public service. He developed the technique of matrix isolation in low-temperature chemistry. He also developed time-resolved infrared spectroscopy to study radicals and other transient species. In the late 1960s, Pimentel led the University of California team that designed the infrared spectrometer for the Mars Mariner 6 and 7 missions that analyzed the surface and atmosphere of Mars.

He was a passionate and popular teacher of first-year chemistry for his entire career. In science education, he was best known for the CHEM STUDY project, a national effort to improve high-school chemistry teaching. He participated in the production of films and other supplementary materials and in the training of teachers nationwide. Later, in 1985, he organized and edited the National Academy of Sciences' "Pimentel Report," formally known as Opportunities in Chemistry, which highlighted the most important challenges in chemistry at that time. It was a resource for general public including lawmakers. A revised version, Opportunities in Chemistry Today and Tomorrow, was used worldwide for high school and college students.

An alumnus of University of California, Los Angeles (B.S. 1943) and University of California, Berkeley (Ph.D. 1949), Pimentel began teaching at Berkeley in 1949, where he remained until his death in 1989 from intestinal cancer, with a three year appointment as Deputy Director at the National Science Foundation under the Carter administration in Washington, D.C..

== Chemical laser ==
In 1961, John C. Polanyi was the first to point out the possibility of chemical pumping based on vibrational excitation. He proposed four possible reactions, one of which was the reaction of H + Cl_{2}. Using an infrared spectrometer, Jerome Kasper and Pimentel discovered infrared pulses produced by photodissociation of iodine, the first chemical laser. In September 1964, they announced their discovery at the first conference on chemical lasers, by that time more than 100 possible chemical reactions and 60 photodissociation reactions were proposed capable of producing laser radiation. However, at the symposium in San Diego only one working laser was reported, which was laced with photodissociation of iodine.

In 1965, Kasper and Pimentel discovered the laser radiation HCl, arising from the explosion of the system H_{2} / Cl_{2}. After the discovery of the laser based on the reaction of F + H_{2} in 1967, the number of chemical lasers found by the Pimentel laboratory rapidly increased. Thus, Pimentel first transformed the chemical energy obtained as a result of vibrational excitation into laser radiation.

== Honors and awards ==
In 1966, Pimentel was elected to the National Academy of Sciences and in 1968 to the American Academy of Arts and Science. In 1987 and 1989 he was elected an honorary member of the Royal Chemical Society (Great Britain), and the Royal Institute of Great Britain. In 1987, he served as the President of the American Chemical Society.

The ACS Award in Chemical Education was renamed the George C. Pimentel Award in Chemical Education in his honor in 1989.

- Earle K. Plyler Prize for Molecular Spectroscopy (1979)
- Wolf Prize in Chemistry (1982)
- Peter Debye Award (1983)
- Elected to the American Philosophical Society (1985)
- National Medal of Science (1985)
- Franklin Medal (1985)
- Welch Award (1986)
- American Institute of Chemists Gold Medal (1988)
- Priestley Medal (1989)
- George C. Pimentel Award in Chemical Education (1990)
