= Lawrence F. Dahl =

American chemist (1929–2021)

- Born: June 2, 1929
- Died: March 20, 2021 (aged 91)
- Education: University of Louisville
- Known for: Small molecule X-ray crystallography
- Awards: Willard Gibbs Award, Alexander von Humboldt Award
- Scientific career
- Fields: Inorganic chemistry
- Workplaces: University of Wisconsin-Madison

Lawrence F. Dahl (June 2, 1929 – March 20, 2021) was an R.E. Rundle and Hilldale Professor of Chemistry at the University of Wisconsin–Madison. Dahl was an inorganic chemist, and his research focused on high-nuclearity metallic compounds. He was elected to the National Academy of Sciences in 1988.

== Early life and education ==
Dahl was born in 1929. He earned his B.S. degree from the University of Louisville in 1951 and his Ph.D. from Iowa State University in 1956.

== Career ==
In 1957 Dahl joined the faculty in the chemistry department at the University of Wisconsin–Madison. His laboratory made significant contributions in the synthesis, structure, and bonding of transition metal compounds. Dahl trained 95 Ph.D. candidates, 24 M.S. students, 45 undergraduate research students, and 15 postdoctoral fellows.

== Selected awards and distinctions ==
- 1969–1970 – Guggenheim Fellow
- 1980 – Elected Fellow of the American Association for the Advancement of Science
- 1985 – Alexander von Humboldt Award
- 1988 – Elected to the National Academy of Sciences
- 1992 – Elected Fellow of American Academy of Arts and Sciences
- 1999 – Willard Gibbs Award
- 2010 – F. Albert Cotton Award in Synthetic Inorganic Chemistry
- 2014 – Elected Fellow of the American Crystallographic Association
