= Debra R. Rolison =

Debra R. Rolison is a physical chemist at the Naval Research Laboratory, where she is a head of the Advanced Electrochemical Materials section. Rolison's research involves the design, synthesis, and characterization of multi-functional nanostructures and ultra porous materials for rate-critical applications such as catalysis and energy storage. She is the 112th recipient of the William H. Nichols Medal Award.

== Life and education ==
Rolison was born in Iowa. She moved to south Florida in 1968 where she attended high school. She received her B.S. from Florida Atlantic University in 1975, where she was a Faculty Scholar between 1972 and 1975.

She received her PhD from University of North Carolina at Chapel Hill in 1980.

== Research and career ==
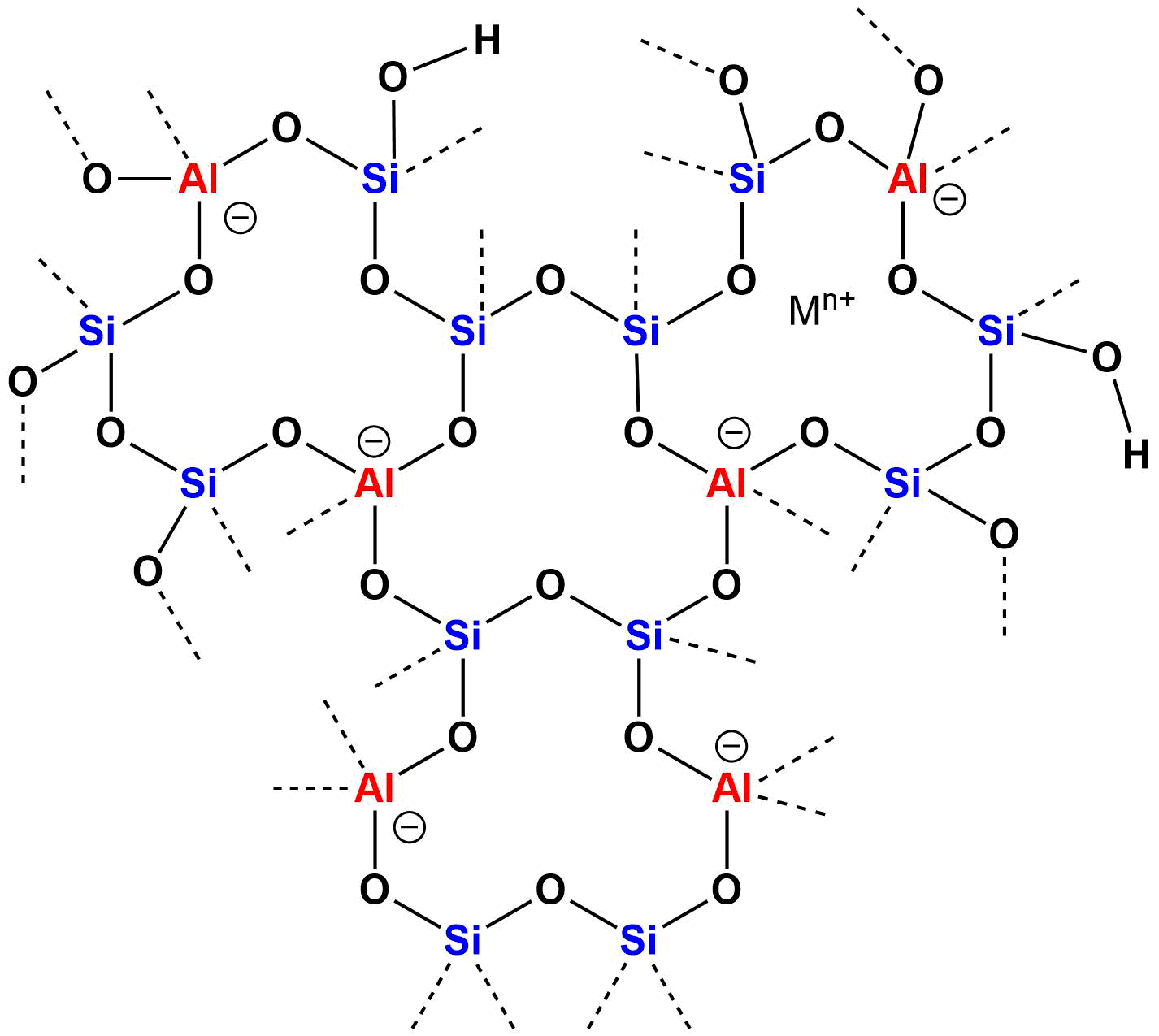
2-D structure of a zeolite lattice

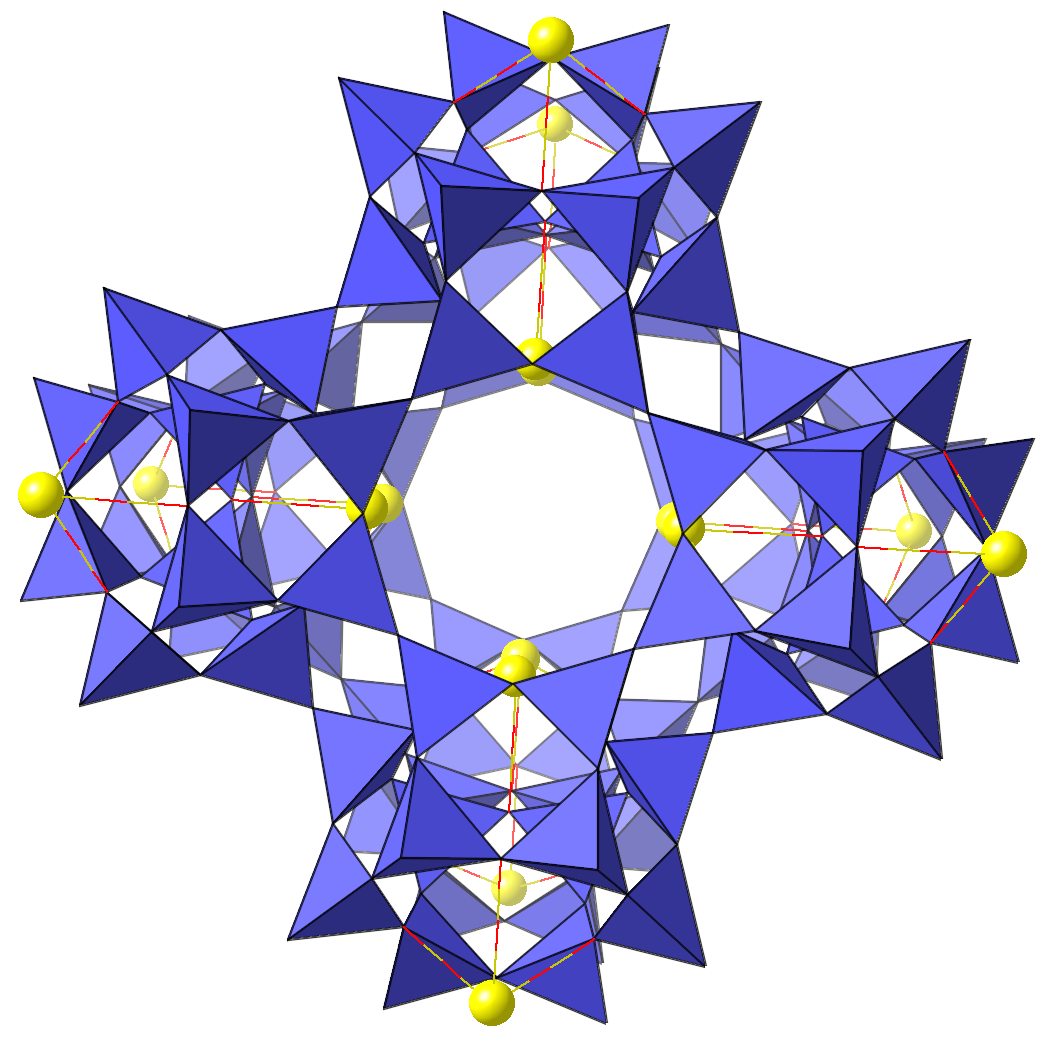
3-D structure of a zeolite lattice

Rolison began her work at the Naval Research Laboratory (NRL) in 1980 immediately after finishing her PhD. She started the Advanced Electrochemical Materials section at the NRL in 1999. She is the author of over 200 articles and holds 24 patents.

=== Zeolite modified electrodes and electrode modified zeolites ===
Rolison is known for her research on the modification of electrode surfaces with Zeolites. "Zeolite modified electrodes" are ordinary electrodes coated with a layer of zeolite/polymer composite that excludes particles based on size, shape, and charge. "Electrode-modified zeolites" are synthesized with electroactive transition metal ions or complexes trapped within the lattice "cages" of the zeolite. The "metalated" zeolite is either pressed into a zeolite/polymer composite and used as a solid electrode, or a slurry is dispersed in an electrochemical cell. The metal ions within the zeolite lattice provide redox sites for electrochemical reactions, while the zeolite lattice excludes particles based on size, shape, and charge.

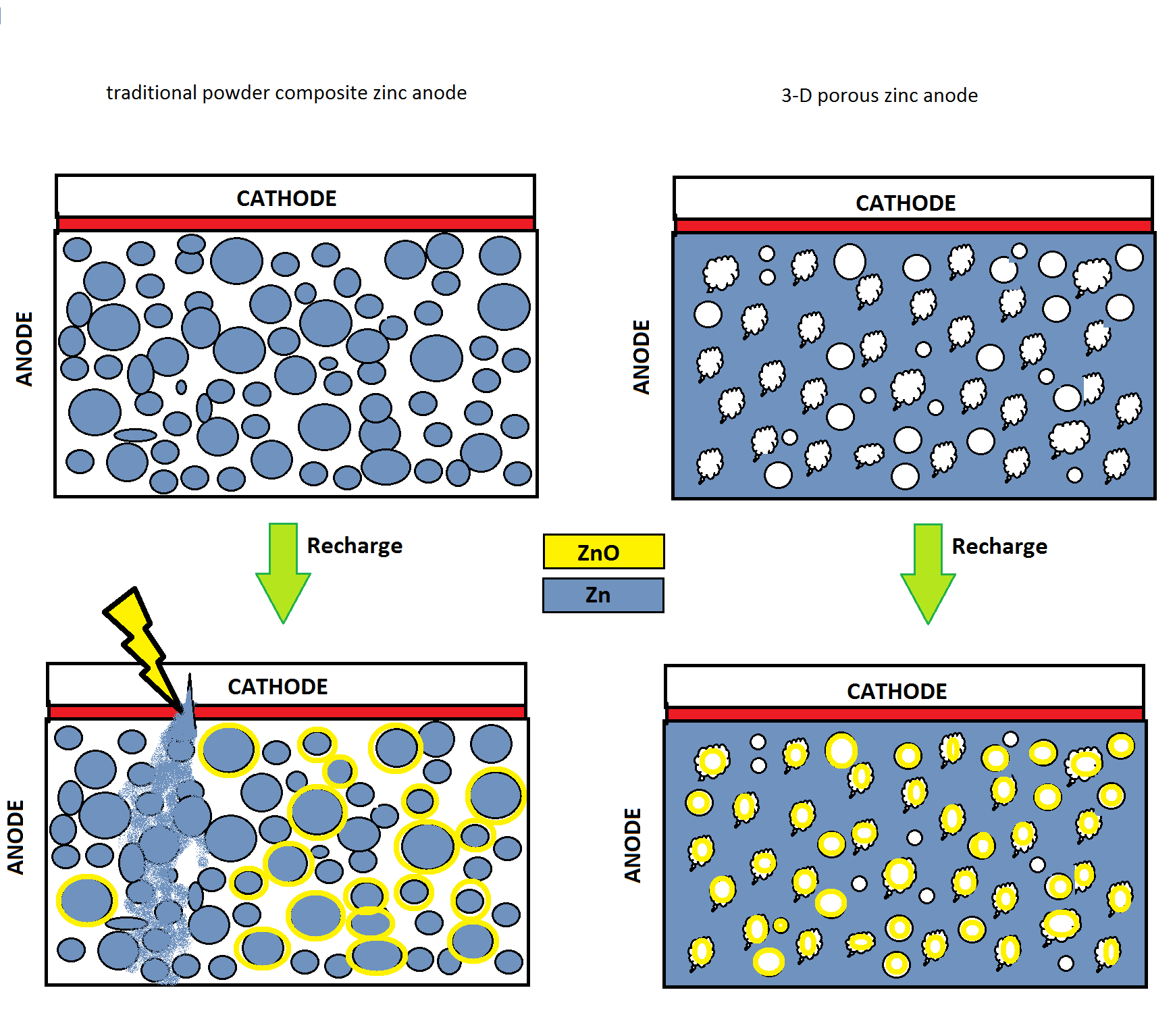
dendrite formation in zinc batteries

=== Zinc-air rechargeable battery ===
Rolison's latest accomplishment is the invention of a zinc-air rechargeable battery with "energy/power performance that meet[s] or exceed[s] state-of-the-art Li-ion batteries". According to Rolison's paper, "interparticle connectivity is lost in powder-composite electrodes leading to regions of high local current density and dendrite formation". While simple zinc-air batteries use a zinc oxide "powder-composite" anode, Rolison's battery uses a zinc "sponge" which preserves interparticle connectivity and maintains a uniform current distribution within the 3D structure of the anode, thereby preventing the regions of locals current density which promote dendrite formation.

== Awards and Prizes ==
- 2001: Elected Fellow of the American Association for the Advancement of Science
- 2008: Elected Fellow of the Materials Research Society "For developing a class of multifunctional ultraporous materials to address key requirements in future battery, fuel cell, and sensing technologies; and for fundamental studies of structure–property relationships in nanostructured materials."
- 2011: American Chemical Society Award in the Chemistry of Materials
- 2011: Hillebrand Award Chemical Society of Washington
- 2012: Charles N. Reilley Awardees by Society for Electroanalytical Chemistry (SEAC)
- 2014: ACS Division of Analytical Chemistry Award in Electrochemistry
- 2016: Dr. Dolores M. Etter Award - Group category (U.S. Naval Research Laboratory (NRL))
- 2018: William H. Nichols Medal Award
