= Willard Gibbs Award =

American chemistry award

The Willard Gibbs Award, presented by the Chicago Section of the American Chemical Society, was established in 1910 by William A. Converse (1862–1940), a former Chairman and Secretary of the Chicago Section of the society and named for Professor Josiah Willard Gibbs (1839–1903) of Yale University. Gibbs, whose formulation of the phase rule founded a new science, is considered by many to be the only American-born scientist whose discoveries are as fundamental in nature as those of Newton and Galileo.

The purpose of the award is "To publicly recognize eminent chemists who, through years of application and devotion, have brought to the world developments that enable everyone to live more comfortably and to understand this world better." Medalists are selected by a national jury of eminent chemists from different disciplines. The nominee must be a chemist who, because of the preeminence of their work in and contribution to pure or applied chemistry, is deemed worthy of special recognition.

The award consists of an eighteen-carat gold medal having, on one side, the bust of J. Willard Gibbs, for whom the medal was named. On the reverse is a laurel wreath and an inscription containing the recipient's name.

Mr. Converse supported the award personally for a number of years, and then established a fund for it in 1934 that has subsequently been augmented by the Dearborn Division of W. R. Grace & Co. When Betz purchased the Dearborn/Grace division, the BetzDearborn Foundation had most generously continued the historic relationship between the Section and Dearborn. J. Fred Wilkes and his wife have also made considerable contributions to the award. However, since General Electric purchased Betz/Dearborn these companies are no longer contributing to the Willard Gibbs Medal Fund.

== List of winners ==
1. Svante Arrhenius 1911
2. Theodore William Richards 1912 Scientific address: "Atomic Weights"
3. Leo H. Baekeland 1913
4. Ira Remsen 1914 Address: "The Development of Chemical Research in America"
5. Arthur Amos Noyes 1915
6. Willis R. Whitney 1916
7. Edward W. Morley 1917 Address: "Early Researches in Hydrogen and Oxygen"
8. William M. Burton 1918 Address: "Chemistry in the Petroleum Industry"
9. William A. Noyes 1919 Address: "Positive and Negative Valences"
10. F. G. Cottrell 1920 Address: "International Scientific Relations"
11. Mme. Marie Curie 1921
12. Julius Stieglitz 1923 (no award in 1922)
13. Gilbert N. Lewis 1924
14. Moses Gomberg 1925
15. Sir James Colquhoun Irvine 1926 Address: "Progress in the Structure Study of Carbohydrates (1901-1926)"
16. John Jacob Abel 1927
17. William Draper Harkins 1928 Address: "Surface Structure and Atom Building"
18. Claude Silbert Hudson 1929
19. Irving Langmuir 1930
20. Phoebus A. Levene 1931 Scientific address: "Chemical Structure and Optical Activity"
21. Edward Curtis Franklin 1932 Scientific address: "The Ammonia System of Compounds"
22. Richard Willstätter 1933
23. Harold Clayton Urey 1934 Scientific address: "The Significance of the Hydrogen Isotopes"
24. Charles August Kraus 1935 Scientific address: "The Present State of the Problem of Electrolytes"
25. Roger Adams 1936 Scientific address: "The Preparation and Study of Deuterium Compounds of the Type R_{1}R_{2}CHD"
26. Herbert Newby McCoy 1937 Scientific address: "The Separation of Europium from Other Rare Earths and the Properties of the Compounds of This Element"
27. Robert R. Williams 1938 Scientific address: "The Chemistry and Biological Significance of Thiamin"
28. Donald Dexter Van Slyke 1939 Scientific address: "Renal Mechanisms Controlling Blood Composition"
29. Vladimir Ipatieff 1940 Scientific address: "Mixed Catalysis"
30. Edward A. Doisy 1941 Scientific address: "Recent Developments in the Investigation of Vitamin K and Other Anti-Hemorrhagic Compounds"
31. Thomas Midgley Jr. 1942 Scientific address: "A Critical Examination of Some Concepts in Rubber Chemistry"
32. Conrad A. Elvehjem 1943 "For studies involving trace elements in nutrition, tissue respiration in relation to vitamin function, and the B-vitamins; for discovering the identity of nicotinic acid as the antipelagra vitamin; and for demonstrating outstanding leadership in nutritional chemistry in the United States this 32nd Willard Gibbs Medal Award is made"
33. George O. Curme Jr. 1944 Scientific address: "Chemistry for the Many"
34. Frank C. Whitmore 1945 Scientific address: "Peace to War and Back Again"
35. Linus Pauling 1946 "...for eminent work and original contributions in chemistry and related scientific fields, through the determination of many molecular structures, inter-atomic distances, bond angles, and covalent radii of atoms; for quantitation of the classical theory of electronegativity; for extension and application of the resonance principle to chemistry; and for the formulation of a framework theory of antibody formation."
36. Wendell M. Stanley 1947 "For his outstanding contributions to the chemistry of viruses beginning with the isolation of tobacco virus and its characterization as a nucleoprotein; for the isolation of other viruses such as cucumber mosaic, alfalfa mosaic, tobacco necrosis, jaundice of silkworms ... with their identification as distinct nucleoproteins; and for distinguished research on the influence virus with subsequent development of vaccines"
37. Carl F. Cori 1948 "...in recognition of his many fundamental contributions to the chemistry of carbohydrate metabolism - notably his discovery of glucose-1-phosphate (the Cori ester), his isolation of crystalline muscle phosphorylase and the elucidation of the role played by these substances in the enzymatic synthesis of glycogen; his studies on the regulatory effects of the pituitary, pancreatic, and adrenal cortical hormones on glucose utilization; and his investigations concerning the energetics of carbohydrate transformations"
38. Peter J. W. Debye 1949 "For basic and highly original researches in chemistry and related sciences. His contributions include major advances in: the theory of specific heats, the theory of the relation of dipole moment to molecular configuration, the determination of structures of crystals by means of X-rays diffracted by fine powders, the elucidation of the structures of molecules by X-ray diffraction and by electron diffraction, the use of adiabatic demagnetization for the production of low temperature, the use of scattered light and viscosity for the estimation of sizes and shapes of larger molecules and colloidal particles, and the mathematical formulation of the theory of inter ionic forces within electrolytic solutions"
39. Carl S. Marvel 1950 "...for fundamental and highly original researches in organic chemistry. He has made outstanding contributions in many fields, among which are the following: the synthesis of amino acids, the structure of assocs. compounds, the use of magnetic susceptibilities in measuring the degree of dissociation of hexarylethanes, the comparison of hexaethynylethanes with hexarylethanes, the interpretation in terms of hydrogen bonding of the solubility of organic compounds in organic solvents, sodium catalyzed copolymerization of styrene and butadiene, the structure of urea-formaldehyde polymers and of vinyl polymers, a novel method of producing polyalkylene sulfides, the preparation and structure of sulfur dioxide-olefin polymers, the variation of the properties of butadiene-styrene copolymers with the structure of the monomers, and reactions of polymeric molecules."
40. William Francis Giauque 1951 "...for extending science into the hitherto unattained region approaching the absolute zero of temperature and thereby contributing notably to fundamental thermodynamic theory and practice: attainment and measurement of temperatures just above absolute zero by highly original and skillful means; measurement and calculation of entropies and other important reports of substances at these temperatures, resulting directly in the verification of the third law of thermodynamics and in the resolution of the critical discrepancy in the entropies of hydrogen and incidentally in the discovery of the heavy isotopes of oxygen..."
41. William C. Rose 1952 "For renowned contributions to the biochemistry of proteins, for sustained and ingenious research into the role of amino acids in metabolism and nutrition, for isolation and identification of threonine - the final essential amino acid that permitted rearing animals on diets of completely defined composition, for demonstration of important metabolic interrelationships of amino acids, and for measurement of the amino acid requirements of animals and men."
42. Joel H. Hildebrand 1953 ".....world-renowned teacher of chemistry, formulator of wise educational policy, important and far-seeing military and government advisor in both World Wars I and II. In appreciation for these services, and in recognition of his fundamental contribution to the physical chemistry of solubility, his definition of the field, his continuing leadership for nearly forty years, his elucidation of the principles of solubility, his many important experimental data in the field, and his lucid exposition in the two editions of his book on the subject."
43. Elmer K. Bolton 1954 "As one of the founders of the technology of the American dyestuffs industry, who served for fifteen years in responsible charge of the development of processes for the manufacture of dyestuffs, of tetraethyl lead, and other organic compounds, and who for another twenty-one years was the director of the research organization that was responsible for many significant advances, among the most noteworthy of which were neoprene and nylon"
44. Farrington Daniels 1955 "In recognition of his brilliant and diversified contributions to chemical kinetics, photochemistry, isotopic reactions and atomic power, solar energy, thermoluminescence, and other branches of physical chemistry; of his devotion to the education and inspiration of students of chemistry; and of his services to the welfare of his fellow men and fellow chemists throughout the world"
45. Vincent du Vigneaud 1956 "For outstanding contributions to chemistry by virtue of his researches on metabolism of sulfur compounds, the mechanism of transmethylation, the isolation and characterization of biotin, the protein nature of insulin and the characterization and synthesis of hormones of the pituitary gland, and for the training and inspiration of students of biochemistry"
46. W. Albert Noyes Jr. 1957 (son of William A. Noyes) "For outstanding accomplishments in the administration of great scientific societies and of important defense agencies of his country; for competent and effective advice to government in time of peace; for inspiring teaching and wise counsel of students; for his many personal services to sciences and scientists of all nations; for his own basic researches in electrochemistry, fluorescence, spectroscopy, and reaction kinetics; but especially for imaginative and critical inquiries into the mechanisms of chemical reactions, as exemplified by his fundamental contributions toward the identification and understanding of 'primary photochemical processes' "
47. Willard F. Libby 1958 "For initiation of the study of radioactive material produced by cosmic rays in the atmosphere of the earth; for development of the technique of radiocarbon dating of archeological and geographic events, and of the use of tritium for following meteorological and geophycial processes; for outstanding pioneer work in the application of radioactivity to chemical and other scientific problems."
48. Hermann I. Schlesinger 1959 "For outstanding accomplishments in the field of inorganic chemistry; for pioneering studies in the field of boron chemistry; for the discovery of simple chemical methods for the synthesis of diborane; for the discovery of metal borohydrides; and the elaboration of practical procedures for their preparation; for the discovery of the outstandingly important reagent lithium aluminum hydride."
49. George B. Kistiakowsky 1960 "For his work in the kinetics of fast and slow reactions extending from enzymatic, photochemical and isomerization reactions to gaseous detonation and explosives, for his leadership of the classical work on heats of hydrogenation and their use in estimating resonance energies, and as an outstanding teacher and scientist in the service of his country"
50. Louis Plack Hammett 1961 "For pioneering contributions to the fundamentals of physical-organic chemistry, for noteworthy research in physical chemistry, for outstanding publications in both fields, for inspirational pedagogy, and for distinguished public service to his country and to his profession"
51. Lars Onsager 1962 "In recognition of his critical study and precise expression of the principles of conduction in electrolytes and fused salts; for useful equations defining these principles, for fundamental concepts of superconduction and semiconduction; for his stimulating leadership in physical science"
52. Paul D. Bartlett 1963 "In recognition of his work in organic and physical-organic chemistry; specifically, the work on the chemistry of bicyclic compounds substituted at a bridgehead, the rapid aluminum chloride catalyzed hydrogen-halogen exchange reactions, rate studies on free radical polymerizations, mechanistic studies on reactions of peresters and of elemental sulfur; for his contributions to organic chemistry through championing the solution of organic problems through synthesis and study of tailor-made compounds designed to test the really critical points in question"
53. Izaak M. Kolthoff 1964 "In recognition of his unique influence on, and his manifold contributions to the understanding, practice and teaching of analytical chemistry as exemplified by his fundamental studies of classical titrimetry, indicators, pH and buffer solutions, coprecipitation and the aging of precipitates, polarography, the kinetics and mechanisms of emulsion polymerization, and potentiometric, conductimetric and amperometric titrations"
54. Robert S. Mulliken 1965 "In recognition of his pioneering research on the application of quantum mechanics to the electronic structure and reactivity of molecules, notably, the development of the molecular orbital theory and the interpretation of the spectra of molecules"
55. Glenn T. Seaborg 1966 "For his pioneering work in radiochemistry, specifically as co-discoverer of the transuranium elements and more than one hundred isotopes throughout the periodic table; and for outstanding achievements in scientific and academic administration and in government service."
56. Robert Burns Woodward 1967 "For the trail-blazing style of his syntheses of natural products, including quinine, cortisone, strychnine, lysergic acid, reserpine, and chlorophyll; For his synthesis of a firm union among theoretical chemistry, synthetic organic chemistry, and modern instrumental techniques; and For his elucidation of complex structures, including those of ferrocene, carbomycin, and oxytetracycline."
57. Henry Eyring 1968 "For his fundamental contributions to nearly every phase of physical chemistry, notably His role in developing and applying the absolute-reaction theory and the concept of the activated complex, and His pioneering research in the theory of the liquid state."
58. Gerhard Herzberg 1969 "For his outstanding contributions to physics and chemistry, especially in the field of atomic and molecular spectroscopy as exemplified by his work confirming the predictions of quantum electrodynamics, by his investigation of dissociation and pre dissociation phenomena, and by the publication of his life's work, Molecular Spectra and Molecular Structure."
59. Frank H. Westheimer 1970 "For his far-reaching interdisciplinary creativeness and his impressive contributions to physical-organic chemistry notably the introduction of the kinetic isotope effect as a mechanistic tool in the study of chromate oxidation, the calculation of electrostatic effects of substituents, the first successful calculation of steric effects from measurable physical parameters, and the rigorous application of physical-organic techniques to biological problems."
60. Henry Taube 1971 "For his outstanding contributions to the renaissance, systematization, and understanding of inorganic chemistry, notably in the kinetics and mechanisms, where his theories correlating electron transfer with substitution reactions, his insight and experimental skill, and his ingenious exploitation of intricate chemical systems have rewoven the whole fabric of inorganic chemistry."
61. John T. Edsall 1972 "For his application of physical chemistry to protein structure and function; for his many studies on amino acids and peptides as dipolar ions; for his fractionation of plasma proteins and his research on the enzyme carbonic anhydrase of red blood cells."
62. Paul John Flory 1973 "...for his fundamental contributions, theoretical and experimental, to the elucidation of the physical chemistry of high polymers, which gained him recognition as the founder of the discipline now known as polymer chemistry; for his development of the statistical thermodynamics of phase transition in polymers; for his achievement in relating properties polymeric materials to their structure; for his application of the insights afforded by these advances to the interpretation of the properties and behavior of biological macromolecules."
63. Har Gobind Khorana 1974 "...for his pioneering and creative contributions to the synthesis of poly-nucleotides, an important science of which he is the acknowledged leader; for his synthesis of polynucleotides containing repeating specific nucleotide specific sequences which contributed profoundly to our understanding of the genetic code; for his monumental and far-reaching accomplishment of the synthesis of a gene."
64. Herman F. Mark 1975 "...for pioneering in the conversion of polymer technology from an art to a science - particularly in elucidating the structure of several natural polymers, the chemistry of cellulose, the elasticity of rubber, and the kinetics of polymerization, and in developing the technology of synthetic fibers; and for continued skillful presentation and interpretation, to fellow scientists and technologists, of the latest developments in polymer science and relationships between polymer composition and properties."
65. Kenneth S. Pitzer 1976 "...for immense contributions to quantum mechanics, statistical mechanisms and thermodynamics; for pioneer work in formulating the concepts of conformational analysis; for basic investigations in spectroscopy and structure, solutions of electrolytes, particularly at high temperatures, and applications of calorimetry to fundamental physical questions; for versatility unmatched, not only as a creative investigator, but as a teacher and administrator."
66. Melvin Calvin 1977 "For pioneering studies in the mechanism of photosynthesis and bioenergetics; for the application of scientific theory toward the solution of the most fundamental problems of our age - the problems of energy, food, chemical, and viral carcinogenesis, and the origin of life; for outstanding achievements as scientist, author, teacher, and counselor."
67. W. O. Baker 1978 "For pioneering studies of the electro-magnetic behavior of organic solids; for the application of macromolecular chemistry to the production of synthetic rubber and in the use of ablative heat shields for space vehicle re-entry; for unmatched and inspiring leadership in the translation of science into innovative technology for modern telecommunication and information processing; for extraordinary breadth, depth, and scope in public service and scientific statesmanship."
68. E. Bright Wilson 1979 "For pioneering work in the Development of High Resolution Infrared and Microwave Spectroscopy. His contributions have provided the basis for both the experimental techniques and the theoretical apparatus used to interpret the experiments. Through his students and through his extensive writings, he has established a school of molecular spectroscopy that has profoundly altered the way in which we think about molecular structures."
69. Frank Albert Cotton 1980 "For his discovery of the fluxional behavior of transition metal organometallic compounds; for his discovery of metal-metal multiple bonded metal complexes; for his pioneering research on these systems; for the fact that these discoveries and studies are responsible for the development of a revolutionary new understanding of the bonding forces in organometallic and inorganic molecules; and for his outstanding achievements as scientist, author, and teacher."
70. Bert Lester Vallee 1981 "For his pioneering discoveries in the field of metalloenzyme chemistry; for his discovery and characterization of metalloenzymes and other metalloproteins; for his fundamental work with reverse transcriptase, a zinc-containing enzyme, that advanced understanding of genetic control and cancer; for his development of microwave excitation spectroscopy as a new analytical tool; and for his application of these fundamental discoveries directly to problems in human health."
71. Gilbert Stork 1982 "For outstanding leadership in the growth of American synthetic chemistry to the premier position it holds today. His original and profound style of thought has had a major influence on the way in which synthetic chemists think about the practice of their science. The imaginative design and use of new reagents to solve specific problems in total synthesis is a Stork trademark, and these innovative methods have extended the influence of his work into the basic fabric of modern organic chemistry."
72. John D. Roberts 1983 "For pioneering studies which for the past thirty years have had an immense impact on the development of organic chemistry. He was among the earliest to use carbon-14 as a tracer in the study of reaction mechanisms and molecular rearrangements. He has been a leader in the use of NMR to establish mechanisms and structures particularly in demonstrating the fluxional nature of Grignard reagents and related molecules and in the observation of a symmetry in organic chemistry."
73. Elias J. Corey 1984 "For outstanding research in the synthesis of organic compounds, particularly the total synthesis of highly complex natural products such as prostaglandins, alkaloids, giberellic acid, hormones, toxins, triterpenes, and others. Many of these syntheses are considered to be milestones in their fields. He has been extraordinarily productive in designing and discovering new reagents for organic synthesis. In conjunction with his deep insight into synthetic methodology, he has pioneered in the application of the computer to the design of synthetic pathways."
74. Donald J. Cram 1985 "For pioneering the applications of carbanions to organic synthesis, Wsterochemical control of synthetic reactions, host–guest chemistry, cyclopean chemistry, phenonium ions and internal return, open chain conformational analysis and stereochemistry of substitution reactions at sulfur. These studies have permitted increased efficiency of industrial processes, definition of stereochemical consequences, high levels of structural recognition in complexation, resolution of amino acids, quantitative production of optically active compounds from inactive starting materials, and modeling of biochemical transacylation reactions. The preparation of host compounds able to selectively complex alkalai metal ions provides a foundation for explaining enzymatic catalysis, biological control systems, immunological response, processing of genetic information, ionophore transport and the reaction of drugs."
75. Jack Halpern 1986 "For major research contributions to chemistry which have advanced the understanding of chemical reactivity especially for systems that involve metal centers in the reaction steps. The central goal of his research has been to extend the knowledge of catalytic processes by providing a detailed description and fundamental understanding of the steps that make up a catalytic cycle and by devising new catalytic processes. He is the recognized leader in an important subfield of catalytic reaction in solution. His early major contributions were concerned with the reactions of dihydrogen in aqueous solution and its activation by metal ions. More recently, his interests have evolved toward understanding the reaction pathways and relative reactivities of organometallic complexes. His studies in this field are diverse and most of them are definitive. Several of his papers on the role that reactions of organometallic compounds play in catalysis are already regarded as classics."
76. Allen J. Bard 1987 "For his research in the application of electrochemical methods to the study of chemical problems. Included are investigations in electro-analytical chemistry, electron spin resonance, electro-organic chemistry, electrogenerated chemiluminescence and photo electrochemistry."
77. Rudolph A. Marcus 1988 "For creating, extending, and examining the theory of unimolecular reactions, which now goes under the name of "RKKM" theory and developing a view toward electron transfer, which is generally now termed Marcus Theory. His work has had a profound and lasting influence on experimentalists and theoreticians in the fields of unimolecular processes and of electron transfer reactions. By the highest standards, his contributions have been central to the field of chemical dynamics."
78. Richard B. Bernstein1989 "For his many outstanding contributions to the understanding of chemical reaction dynamics: his many achievements of molecular beam systems, production of oriented molecules in molecular beams and measurement of the effects of orientation of the reactivity of molecules, and the introduction of multi photon ionization mass spectrometry for state selective molecular beam detection. His trademark of careful and imaginatively designed experiments and detailed theoretical interpretation provides a shining example of outstanding work in the chemical sciences."
79. Richard N. Zare 1990 "For his outstanding contributions through laser chemistry: in development of basic theories of angular distribution of products of molecular photodissociation and subDoppler spectroscopy; in development of experimental tools such as optical pumping and multi photon ionization technique; in application of laser chemistry techniques to solve such diverse problems as basic energy distributions, reactions of aligned ions, and analysis of aromatic hydrocarbons in meteorites. As both experimentalist and theorist, his experiments and interpretations have led the way in understanding of energy states of products of molecular dissociations. He has been called the leading laser chemist in the world for good reason."
80. Günther Wilke 1991
81. Harry B. Gray 1992
82. Peter B. Dervan 1993 "For his outstanding contributions to the fields of physical organic chemistry and bio-organic chemistry. His work constitutes a breakthrough for modern organic chemistry directed toward studies of the noncovalent bond and nucleic acids. He has brought synthesis and design to the field of biopolymers and the methodology of nucleic acids to the field of molecular recognition. His pioneering research at the interface of chemistry and biology has contributed greatly to a set of general chemical principles for sequence specific recognition at single sites in the human genome."
83. M. Frederick Hawthorne 1994 "For outstanding contributions to the fields of inorganic chemistry and organometallic chemistry through his seminal discoveries n the rapidly expanding area of borane clusters. Inparticular, his work has provided pioneering insights into the syntheses, structures, bonding, and reactivity patterns of polyhedral borane anions, carboranes, and metallocarboranes. His research has made possible major new advances at the interfaces of chemistry with the biosciences, medicine, and other fields of contemporary importance such as molecular recognition."
84. Sir John Meurig Thomas 1995 "For pioneering work in solid-state chemistry and materials science and distinguished contributions to the fields of surface chemistry and catalysis. His original work on the internal structure and properties of solids have led to major advances in the science and technology of absorbents and catalysts. His innovative research has produced novel physical and computational techniques to identify powerful solid acid catalysts that are of great industrial and environmental significance. He has pursued scientific excellence and trained many young scientists who have become leaders in their fields."
85. Fred Basolo 1996 "For outstanding contributions to the field of inorganic chemistry and the mechanisms of reactions o organometallic compounds. He was one of the first organic chemists to extend the work of physical organic chemists on substitution reactions of organic compounds to metal complexes. His early research was a sizable portion of a book entitled Mechanisms of Inorganic Reactions, which is often referred to as the "bible" on inorganic mechanisms. His work on synthetic oxygen carriers led to the isolation and characterization of the first series of monomeric O2 complexes of cobalt. He has trained many young scientists who have become leaders in their fields."
86. Carl Djerassi 1997 "For outstanding contributions to the fields of organic synthesis and the applications of physical measurements, especially mass spectrometry and chiroptical methods to organic structure structure determination. His research team was the first to synthesize a steroidal oral contraceptive and his transformation of steroids from Mexican yams was vital to the commercial development of oral contraceptives. In recent years, in addition to continued research and teaching, he has turned to writing novels dealing with the human side of scientific research in the rarely practiced genre of "science-in-fiction". His scientific and literary achievements have proven that he is truly a renaissance man."
87. Mario J. Molina 1998 "For outstanding contributions to the fields of atmospheric reaction chemistry, especially the chemistry of ozone depletion by chlorofluorocarbons (CFCs) and the chemistry of global warming; and for strong and effective advocacy in national and international forums, leading to protocols and agreements which will help to protect and preserve the earth's environment, thereby benefiting all the earth's inhabitants and generations yet unborn."
88. Lawrence F. Dahl 1999 "For outstanding contributions in organometallic and high-nuclearity metal cluster chemistry synthesis and structural characterization of nanometer-sized molecules, in work that has been described as "unique", and "superb science"; and for youthful enthusiasm in research and teaching, demonstrated by leadership of an internationally recognized research group which has aided in the understanding of inorganic materials"
89. Nicholas Turro 2000 "For pioneering and interdisciplinary research on the interaction of light and organic molecules, for the invention of novel and general methods for investigation of organic reactions of supra molecular systems, and for the development of organic systems whose reactivity is extremely sensitive to the application of weak magnetic fields."
90. Tobin J. Marks 2001 "For highly original research that has had a major, lasting impact on important areas of chemical science, including f-element coordination and organometallic chemistry, homogeneous small molecule and polymerization catalysis, molecule-based photonics materials, low-dimensional electronic conductors, oxide chemical vapor deposition, high temperature superconductors, and metallocene anti-tumor agents."
91. Ralph Hirschmann 2002 "For the first synthesis of an enzyme in solution (RNase); the concept of stereolectronic control; the use of prodrugs to reduce toxicity; a new approach to the design of peptidomimetics; the discovery of valuable pharmaceuticals including Vaster, Lisinopril, Primaxin, Ivomec, Menacer, and Proscar."
92. John I. Brauman 2003 "For work that fundamentally changed the understanding f chemical structures and reactivities. For research that revealed intrinsic stabilities and reactivities and provided models for the dramatic effect of solvation on chemical reactions. For major advances in the understanding of energy transfer and its effect on reaction dynamics. For studies using photo detachment to provide accurate descriptions of chemical structures."
93. Ronald Breslow 2004 "for seminal work in the development of anti-aromaticity; for pioneering work in bioorganic chemistry, for inspiring the creation of the field of biomimetic chemistry, for research in organic chemistry leading to advances in medical applications"
94. David A. Evans 2005 "For seminal work in synthesis methodology, for pioneering work in asymmetric catalysis, for remarkable achievements in the area of natural product total synthesis"
95. Jacqueline K. Barton 2006 "For seminal work in the study of the structure and dynamics of DNA. This work is fundamental to our understanding of the molecular chemistry of DNA and its relevance to the development of diseases and inherited abnormalities"
96. Sylvia T. Ceyer 2007 "For seminal work in molecule-surface reaction dynamics as related to heterogeneous catalysis and semiconductor etching"
97. Carolyn R. Bertozzi 2008 "For her studies of cell surface glycosylation pertinent to disease states; For profiling changes in cell surface glycosylation associated with cancer, inflammation and bacterial infection; and exploiting this information for development of diagnostic and therapeutic approaches; and for developing nanoscale technologies for probing cell function, and medical diagnostics."
98. Louis Brus 2009 "For his leading role in the creation of chemical quantum dots. Brus's work led to a general understanding of how semiconductor nanocrystals, with increasing size, evolve electronically into bulk semiconductors. His group developed the basic models, mechanisms, and methods for nanocrystal synthesis, processing, and characterization that are widely used today."
99. Maurice Brookhart 2010 "For principal achievements in synthetic and mechanistic organometallic chemistry with particular emphasis on the application of organometallic complexes in catalysis. For development of late transition metal complexes for olefin polymerization. These non-traditional catalysts allow synthesis of polymers with unique microstructures, such as hyperbranched polyethylene and chain-straightened poly(α-olefins). For fundamental studies of C-H and C-C bond activations by transition metal complexes and the incorporation of these bond activation steps into catalytic cycles."
100. Robert G. Bergman 2011 "For significant work in physical organic chemistry and organometallic chemistry with major implications for pharmaceutical sciences and the petrochemical industry. For development of the "Bergman cyclization" of ene-diynes, which was ultimately recognized as a prototype for the first step in the mechanism of DNA-damaging by various classes of anti-tumor agents. This has led to literally hundreds of synthetic ene-diyne compounds being tested as drugs. For the discovery of the first soluble organometallic complexes that undergo intermolecular insertion of a transition metal into the carbon-hydrogen bonds of alkanes, and for pioneering the study of the mechanism of C-H bond activation at transition metal centers."
101. Mark A. Ratner 2012 "For principal achievements in molecular electronics, single-molecule aspects of molecular electronics, electron transfer mechanisms, and quantum dynamics, with substantial enhancement of our knowledge o the behavior of single molecules under transport conditions, as well as the dynamical properties of molecular systems"
102. Charles M. Lieber 2013 "For principal achievements in: Synthesis and characterization of nanoscale materials; Fundamental understandings of the properties of nanotubes and nanowires; Innovations in nanoelectronics and nanophotonics; Integration of nanoelectronics and biological systems... while advancing the application of nanotechnologies in medical diagnostics, computing, energy, optoelectronic devices, and biological sciences."
103. John E. Bercaw 2014 "For path-breaking advances in inorganic and organometallic chemistry related to the elucidation of olefin polymerization and hydrocarbon oxidation mechanisms and development of early metal polymerization catalysts"
104. John F. Hartwig 2015 "For groundbreaking advances in organometallic and synthetic organic chemistry related to transition metal-catalyzed construction of carbon-carbon and carbon-heteroatom linkages; for achievements in synthesis, characterization, and mechanistic studies of novel reactive organometallic complexes, and development of new practical catalytic synthetic methods"
105. Laura L. Kiessling 2016 "For pioneering research in chemical biology, including insights into intercellular communication in bacteria and eukaryotes and elucidation of carbohydrate-mediated cell-surface interactions"
106. Judith Klinman 2017 "For ground breaking discoveries in enzyme catalysis which pioneered the application of kinetic isotope effects to the study of enzyme catalysis and mechanism, demonstrated how proteins containing TPQ generate their own cofactors performing two different catalytic roles of biogenesis and catalysis, launched the field of protein derived cofactor that mediates enzyme activity and demonstrated anomalies in kinetic studies that led to the discovery that protein structures have evolved to catalyze effective quantum mechanical tunneling"
107. Cynthia Burrows 2018 "For groundbreaking work in the chemistry of DNA damage, particularly chemical modifications related to oxidative stress occurring on guanine, one of the bases of DNA and RNA. • Identified hyperoxidized structures in DNA and elucidated their effects on DNA structure and biochemistry. • Investigated the chemical structures and mechanisms by which DNA and RNA bases, notably guanine, undergo transformations under conditions of oxidative stress. • Synthesized and characterized site-specifically modified DNA and RNA strands, allowing the study of proteins that interact with modified bases such as those involved in replication, transcription and repair. • Identified hyperoxidized hydantoin lesions in DNA that are highly mutagenic and appear to play significant roles in signaling for DNA repair."
108. Marcetta Y. Darensbourg 2019 "For lifelong accomplishments in inorganic chemistry, including: control of metal carbonyl anion structure and reactivity, extensive work in synthesizing complexes that serve as models for hydrogenase enzymes, introduction of novel catalysts for hydrogen production."
109. Zhenan Bao 2020 "For pioneering concepts on design, synthesis, processing, and characterization of organic semiconductors. For pioneering molecular design rules for mobility in semiconductors. For developing a method to print large arrays of patterned single crystals as the basis for fabricating practical devices. For pioneering the field of skin-inspired electronics. For important contributions to the engineering of carbon nanomaterials."
110. Sharon Hammes-Schiffer 2021 "• For expertise in the development and application of theoretical and computational methods for describing chemical reactions in condensed phases and at interfaces. • For breakthrough research on proton-coupled electron transfer (PCET) reactions and enzymatic processes that have provided new strategies for designing light-harvesting assemblies for solar energy conversion. • For studies using PCET of the excited state properties of inorganic complexes with implications for artificial photosynthesis, charge transfer dynamics, and quantum mechanical effects in chemical, biological, and interfacial processes."
111. Joseph Francisco 2022 "• For pioneering work to apply computational chemistry to determine the atmospheric fate of chlorofluorocarbons and their alternatives. • For discovery of a new class of radical–molecule complexes and their relation to association species in the atmosphere that lead to shutting down chemistry at night. • For illustrating how computational studies can be used to drive the discovery of new mechanistic principles governing atmospheric chemical processes."
112. Jennifer Doudna 2023 "• For expertise in the structure and function of RNA leading to the discovery of CRISPR-Cas9 and its underlying mechanism. • For initiating a watershed moment in scientific research making possible the accurate enzymatic splicing of DNA and the targeted genomic editing of cells, tissues and whole organisms. • For creating an accessible technology with potential impacts in agriculture, biotechnology, and medicine, including the “green” manufacture of biofuels and biomaterials"
113. Eric Jacobsen (chemist) 2024 "For discoveries of fundamentally important catalytic reactions which have led to: • The redefining of the way molecules are synthesized, • The uncovering of effective methods for a wide variety of stereoselective reactions, • The development of chiral Schiff base complexes of main group and transition metals, • The discovery and application of novel organic catalysts"
114. Chad Mirkin 2025 "For development of methods, tools, and innovations in the modern field of Nanotechnology: Structural nanomedicine - Spherical Nucleic Acids • Nanopatterning methodologies - Dip-Pen Nanolithography • Materials - Nanocombinatorial chemistry and megalibraries • Delineation of the concept of the nanoparticle "atom" and the nucleic acid "bond" that underpins colloidal crystal engineering with DNA"
115. Stephen L. Buchwald 2026 "For the development of the Buchwald-Hartwig coupling reaction • For fundamental advances in the discovery of metal-catalyzed coupling reactions • For diverse applications of metal-catalyzed coupling reactions in basic research, drug discovery for human health, agrochemicals, materials science, and biology"

Award citations copied from award ceremony programs

== See also ==
- List of chemistry awards
