= William Klemperer =

American chemist (1927–2017)

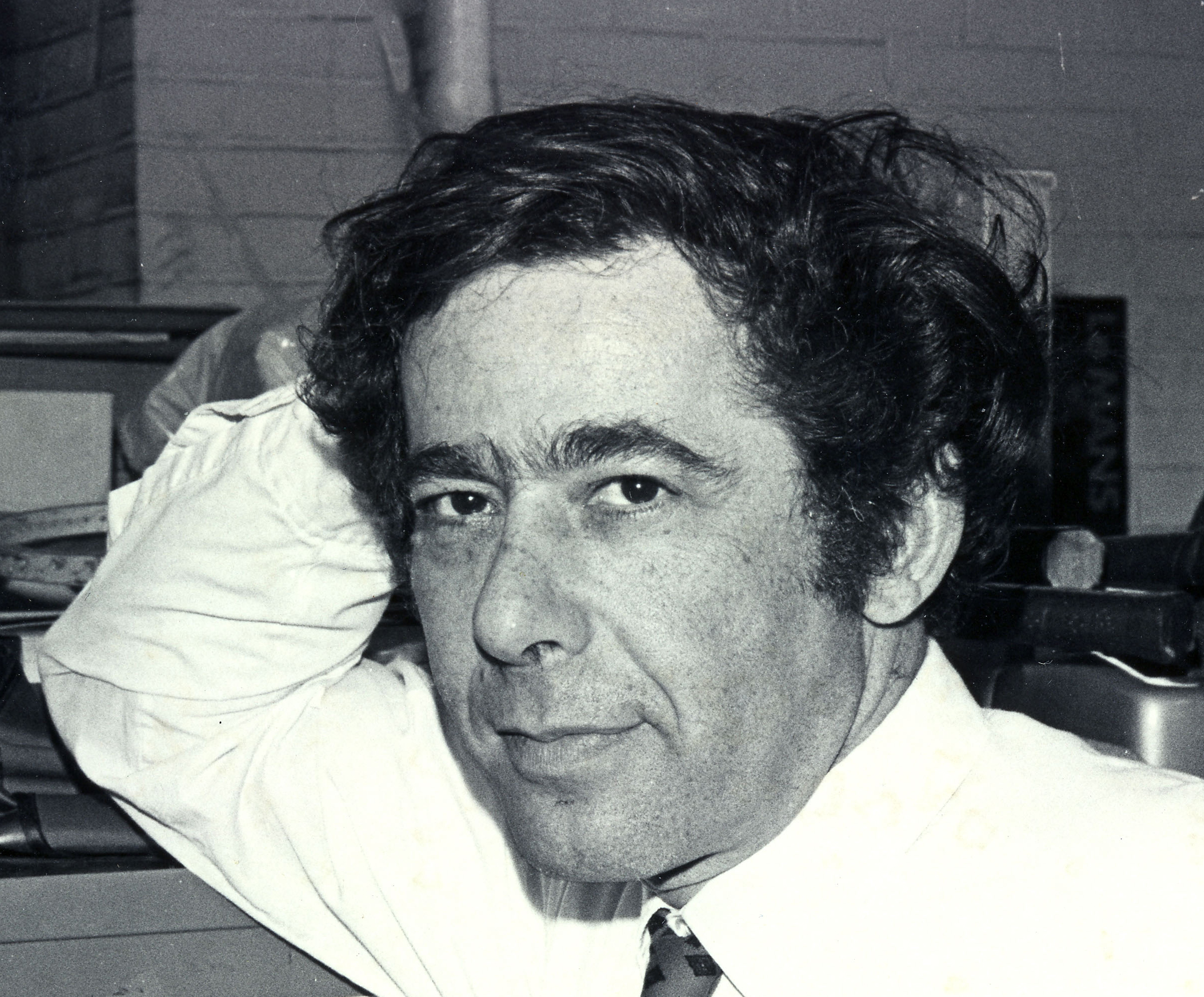
- William Klemperer (captured by Stewart Novick, c. 1970)
- Born: 6 October 1927; New York City, US
- Died: 5 November 2017 (aged 90)
- Education: Harvard University (A.B.), University of California, Berkeley (Ph.D.)
- Scientific career
- Fields: Chemist
- Workplaces: Harvard University
- Doctoral advisor: George C. Pimentel

William Aloys Klemperer (October 6, 1927 – November 5, 2017) was an American chemist, chemical physicist and molecular spectroscopist. Klemperer is most widely known for introducing molecular beam methods into chemical physics research, greatly increasing the understanding of nonbonding interactions between atoms and molecules through development of the microwave spectroscopy of van der Waals molecules formed in supersonic expansions, pioneering astrochemistry, including developing the first gas phase chemical models of cold molecular clouds that predicted an abundance of the molecular HCO^{+} ion that was later confirmed by radio astronomy.

== Biography ==
Bill Klemperer was born in New York City in 1927 as the child of two physicians. He and his younger brother were raised in New York and New Rochelle. He graduated from New Rochelle High School in 1944 and then enlisted in the U.S. Navy Air Corps, where he trained as a tail gunner. He obtained an A.B. from Harvard University in 1950, majoring in Chemistry, and obtained a Ph.D. in Physical Chemistry under the direction of George C. Pimentel at University of California, Berkeley, in early 1954.

After one semester as an instructor at Berkeley, Bill returned to Harvard in July 1954. Though his initial appointment was as an instructor of analytical chemistry, a position which was considered unlikely to lead to a faculty position, he was appointed full professor in 1965. He has remained associated with Harvard Chemistry throughout a long career. He spent 1968-69 on sabbatical at Cambridge University and 1979-81 as Assistant Director for Mathematical and Physical Sciences at the U.S. National Science Foundation. He was a visiting scientist at Bell Laboratories. He also served as an advisor to NASA. Klemperer became an emeritus professor in 2002 but remained active in both research and teaching.

== Science ==
Klemperer's early work concentrated on the infrared spectroscopy of small molecules that are only stable in the gas phase at high temperatures. Among these are the alkali halides, for many of which he obtained the first vibrational spectra. The work provided basic structural data for many oxides and fluorides, and gave insight into the details of the bonding. It also led Klemperer to recognize the potential of molecular beams in spectroscopy, and in particular the use of the electric resonance technique to address fundamental problems in structural chemistry.

Klemperer introduced the technique of supersonic cooling as a spectroscopic tool, which has increased the intensity of molecular beams and also simplified the spectra.

Klemperer helped to found the field of interstellar chemistry. In interstellar space, densities and temperatures are extremely low, and all chemical reactions must be exothermic, with no activation barriers. The chemistry is driven by ion-molecule reactions, and Klemperer's modeling of those that occur in molecular clouds has led to a remarkably detailed understanding of their rich highly non-equilibrium chemistry. Klemperer assigned HCO^{+} as the carrier of the mysterious but universal "X-ogen" radio-astronomical line at 89.6 GHz, which had been reported by D. Buhl and L.E. Snyder.

Klemperer arrived at this prediction by taking the data seriously. The radio telescope data showed an isolated transition with no hyperfine splitting; thus there were no nuclei in the carrier of the signal with spin of one or greater nor was it a free radical with a magnetic moment. HCN is an extremely stable molecule and thus its isoelectronic analog, HCO^{+}, whose structure and spectra could be well predicted by analogy, would also be stable, linear, and have a strong but sparse spectrum. Further, the chemical models he was developing predicted that HCO^{+} would be one of the most abundant molecular species. Laboratory spectra of HCO^{+} (taken later by Claude Woods et al.,) proved him right and thereby demonstrated that Herbst and Klemperer's models provided a predictive framework for our understanding of interstellar chemistry.

The greatest impact of Klemperer's work has been in the study of intermolecular forces, a field of fundamental importance for all of molecular- and nano-science. Before Klemperer introduced spectroscopy with supersonic beams, the spectra of weakly bound species were almost unknown, having been restricted to dimers of a few very light systems. Scattering measurements provided precise intermolecular potentials for atom–atom systems, but provided at best only limited information on the anisotropy of atom–molecule potentials.

He foresaw that he could synthesize dimers of almost any pair of molecules he could dilute in his beam and study their minimum energy structure in exquisite detail by rotational spectroscopy. This was later extended to other spectral regions by Klemperer and many others, and has qualitatively changed the questions that could be asked. Nowadays it is routine for microwave and infrared spectroscopists to follow his "two step synthesis" to obtain the spectrum of a weakly bound complex: "Buy the components and expand." Klemperer quite literally changed the study of the intermolecular forces between molecules from a qualitative to a quantitative science.

The dimer of hydrogen fluoride was the first hydrogen bonded complex to be studied by these new techniques, and it was a puzzle. Instead of the simple rigid-rotor spectrum, which would have produced a 1 to 0 transition at 12 GHz, the lowest frequency transition was observed at 19 GHz. Arguing by analogy to the well known tunneling-inversion spectrum of ammonia, Klemperer recognized that the key to understanding the spectrum was to recognize that HF–HF was undergoing quantum tunnelling to FH–FH, interchanging the roles of proton donor and acceptor.

Each rotational level was split into two tunneling states, with an energy separation equal to the tunneling rate divided by the Planck constant. The observed microwave transitions all involved a simultaneous change in rotational and tunneling energy. The tunneling frequency is extremely sensitive to the height and shape of the inter-conversion barrier, and thus samples the potential in the classically forbidden regions. Resolved tunneling splittings proved to be common in the spectra of weakly bound molecular dimers.

== Awards ==
Bill Klemperer has had many awards and honors, which include:

- Inducted a Fellow of the American Physical Society, 1954
- Elected to the American Academy of Arts and Sciences, 1963
- Elected to the National Academy of Sciences, 1969
- John Price Wetherill Medal, awarded by the Franklin Institute, 1978
- Irving Langmuir Award, awarded by the American Chemical Society, 1980
- The Distinguished Service Medal, awarded by the U.S. National Science Foundation, 1981
- The Earle K. Plyler Prize for Molecular Spectroscopy, awarded by the American Physical Society, 1983
- The Bomem-Michelson Award for the advancement of the field of vibrational spectroscopy. awarded by the Coblentz Society, 1990
- Inaugural George C. Pimentel Memorial Lecturer, Chemistry Department, UC Berkeley. 1991-2.
- The Remsen Award from the Maryland Section of the American Chemical Society, 1992
- The Peter Debye Award in Physical Chemistry, awarded by the American Chemical Society, 1994
- The Faraday Medal and Lectureship from the Royal Society of Chemistry (England), 1995
- Honorary Doctor of Science from the University of Chicago, 1996
- Honorary Citizen of Toulouse, France, 2000
- E. Bright Wilson Award in Spectroscopy from the American Chemical Society, 2001
