= Charles A. Kraus =

American chemist (1875–1967)

Charles August Kraus
- Born: August 15, 1875; Knightsville, Indiana
- Died: June 27, 1967 (aged 91); Providence, Rhode Island
- Education: Hayes City High School
- Alma mater: University of Kansas (B.S., 1898); M.I.T. (PhD, 1908)
- Known for: Pioneering work in Physical Chemistry of liquid ammonia systems, Metallo-organic compounds, and Conductance in non-aqueous solvents.
- Awards: William H. Nichols Medal (1924); Theodore William Richards Medal (1935); Willard Gibbs Medal (1935); Franklin Medal (1938); Navy Distinguished Public Service Award (1948); Priestley Medal (1950)
- Scientific career
- Institutions: University of California; M.I.T. Clark University; Brown University

Charles August Kraus (August 15, 1875 – June 27, 1967) was an American chemist. He was professor of chemistry and director of the chemical laboratories at Clark University, where he directed the Chemical Warfare Service during World War I.

Later, he became professor of chemistry and director of the chemical laboratories at Brown University, and was a consultant to the Manhattan Project to develop the atomic bomb. His research contributed to the development of the ultraviolet lamp, to pyrex, and to the production of a leaded form of ethyl gasoline. He investigated the electrical conductance of liquid ammonia alkali metal solutions contributing to the development of the concept of solvated electron. He published more than 225 research papers.

He was a member of the National Academy of Sciences, American Academy of Sciences, American Philosophical Society, American Chemical Society, American Physical Society, American Association of University Professors, Faraday Society, Washington Academy of Sciences, and an Honorary Fellow of the Franklin Institute.

== Awards ==
He was awarded several medals from the American Chemical Society, including the Priestley Medal in 1950. He was awarded the Franklin Medal in 1938, the Navy Distinguished Public Service Award in 1948, and the Willard Gibbs Award in 1935.
