= Wakefield, Illinois =

- Unincorporated community
- Location within Illinois Location within the United States
- Coordinates: 38°50′24″N 88°14′38″W
- Country: United States
- State: Illinois
- County: Richland
- Elevation: 489 ft (149 m)
- Time zone: UTC-6 (Central (CST))
  - Summer (DST): UTC-5 (CDT)
- Area code: 618
- GNIS feature ID: 420382

Wakefield is an unincorporated community in Richland County, Illinois, United States. Wakefield is 11.5 miles (18.5 km) northwest of Olney. Chemist Reynold C. Fuson was born near Wakefield. Wakefield was a booming community in the early 1900s. There was a grocery store, post office, garage and a church named Liberty Baptist Church.
