= Edward Curtis Franklin =

American chemist (1862–1937)

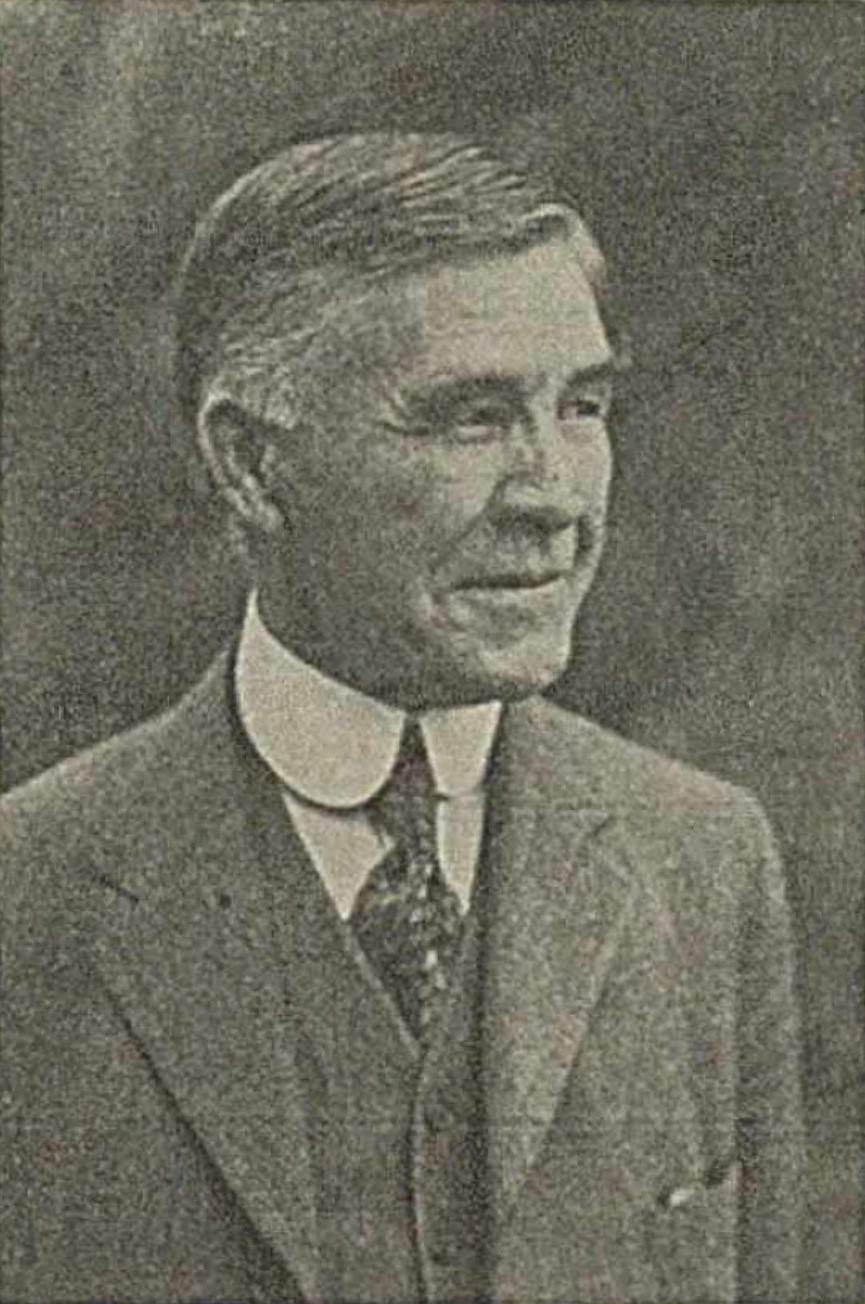
- Franklin in a 1927 publication
- Born: March 1, 1862; Geary City, Kansas
- Died: February 13, 1937 (aged 74); Stanford, California
- Education: University of Kansas (BS, MS); Johns Hopkins University (PhD)
- Occupation: Chemist
- Awards: William H. Nichols Medal (1925); Willard Gibbs Award (1932)

Edward Curtis Franklin (March 1, 1862 – February 13, 1937) was an American chemist.

== Biography ==
Edward Franklin was born on March 1, 1862, in Geary City, Doniphan County, Kansas. He entered the University of Kansas at the age of 22, obtaining his B.S. degree in chemistry in 1888. After completing an M.S. degree in 1890, he decided to study at the University of Berlin for one year, but abandoned it by 1891. In 1892, he came back to State University where he remained till 1893 working as assistant chemist. He graduated from Johns Hopkins University, where he received his Ph.D. degree in chemistry in 1894.

Franklin then came back to University of Kansas where he spent one year as a chemist before becoming an associate professor there. In 1899, he was promoted to professor of physical chemistry. In 1900, he was named a fellow of the American Association for the Advancement of Science.

Franklin also worked as associate manager for a mining project in Costa Rica where he remained till he was informed about coming to Stanford University in 1903. He began as an associate professor there and was promoted to professor of organic chemistry in 1906. From 1911 to 1913, he served as chief of the division of chemistry of the Public Health Service in Washington state.

As life went by, he started to receive honors from home and abroad including Nichols and Willard Gibbs Awards. He was elected as a president of the American Chemical Society and became a member of both the National Academy of Sciences and the American Philosophical Society. Franklin got invited to participate at the British Association for the Advancement of Science at Melbourne, Australia, and Johannesburg, South Africa. He received honorary degrees from Northwestern University (D.Sc., 1923), Western Reserve University (D.Sc., 1926) and Wittenberg College (LL.D., 1927).

Franklin became professor emeritus at Stanford University in 1929. He died at his home on the Stanford campus on February 13, 1937, from coronary thrombosis.

== Siblings ==
- William Suddards Franklin
- Nelle Franklin
- Joseph Franklin
- Thomas Z. Franklin

== Children ==
- Anna Comstock Franklin
- Peter Charles Scott Franklin
- John Curtis Franklin I
