= H. E. Carter =

American biochemist (1910–2007)

Herbert E. Carter
- Born: September 25, 1910; Mooresville, Indiana
- Died: March 4, 2007 (aged 96); Tucson, Arizona
- Education: DePauw University (BA, 1930); University of Illinois
- Known for: Determining the structure of threonine, and pioneering the field of sphingolipids
- Awards: Eli Lilly Award (1943); William H. Nichols Medal (1965); Kenneth A. Spencer Award; Alton E. Bailey Award
- Scientific career
- Fields: Biochemistry
- Workplaces: University of Illinois Urbana-Champaign; University of Arizona
- Doctoral advisor: Carl Shipp Marvel
- Doctoral students: Philip Handler

Herbert Edmund Carter (September 25, 1910 – March 4, 2007) was an American biochemist and educator. He grew up in central Indiana and received his bachelor's degree from DePauw University. He received a Ph.D. in 1934 in organic chemistry from University of Illinois Urbana-Champaign. Was elected to the National Academy of Sciences and the American Academy of Arts and Sciences.

== Career ==
He remained at Illinois as a member of the faculty and served as head of the department of chemistry and chemical engineering (1954–1967) and later as vice chancellor for academic affairs (1968–1971). It was at the University of Illinois that Carter in collaboration with William C. Rose, determined the structure of threonine.

Following his retirement from Illinois in 1971, he moved to the University of Arizona and established the very successful Office of Interdisciplinary Programs. He recognized that the processes and systems underlying individual disciplines are remarkably similar and interdependent, and concluded that what lies in between disciplines—the area of interdisciplinarity—is where future developments, discoveries, and training programs would flourish. The Herbert E. Carter Travel Award is named in his honor. He created and headed the University Department of Biochemistry (1977–1980). He remained active at the University of Arizona until the age of 94.

Carter was also active in the scientific community. He played important roles as President of the American Society of Biological Chemists (1956–1957) and as member (1954) and chair of many important committees of the United States National Academy of Sciences, the National Research Council, the Gordon Research Conferences, the National Institutes of Health, and the National Science Foundation. He served as a member, and then as chairman, of the National Science Board. In recognition of his contributions at the National Science Board, a mountain ridge in Antarctica, Carter Ridge, was named after him. He was the founder of the series Biochemical Preparations, and served as a member of the editorial boards of many scientific journals, including the Journal of Biological Chemistry and the Journal of Lipid Research.

== Awards and honors ==
- 1970 - Received the Alton E. Bailey Award from the North Central Section of the American Oil Chemists' Society
- 1961 - Became a John Simon Guggenheim Memorial Foundation Fellow
- 1952 - Received an honorary degree from DePauw University
- 1953 - Joined the United States National Academy of Sciences
- 1943 - Received the Eli Lilly Award in Biological Chemistry for his identification of the structure and synthesis of sphingosine.

== Selected publications ==
- Carter, H. E., and C. B. Hirschberg. 1968. Phytosphingosines and branched sphingosines in kidney. Biochemistry. 7: 2296–2300.
- Carter, H. E., R. C. Gaver, and R. K. Yu. 1966. A novel branched-chain sphingolipid base from Crithidia facsiculata. Biochem. Biophys. Res. Commun. 22: 316–320.
- Carter, H. E., and Y. Fujino. 1956. Biochemistry of the sphingolipides. IX. Configuration of cerebrosides. J. Biol. Chem. 221: 879–884.
- Carter, H. E., C. P. Schaffner, and D. Gottlieb. 1954. Levomycin. I. Isolation and chemical studies. Arch. Biochem. Biophys. 53: 282–293.
- Carter, H. E., and F. L. Greenwood. 1952. Biochemistry of the sphingolipides. VII. Structure of the cerebrosides. J. Biol. Chem. 199: 283–288.
- Carter, H. E., D. Gottlieb, and H. W. Anderson. 1948. Chloromycetin and streptothricin. Science. 107: 113.
