= Sylvia T. Ceyer =

American chemist

- Born: Chicago, Illinois, U.S.
- Education: Hope College; University of California, Berkeley
- Awards: Harold E. Edgerton Award (1988) Baker Memorial Award for Excellence in Undergraduate Teaching (1988); Young Scholar Award of the American Association of University Women (1988); Nobel Laureate Signature Award of the American Chemical Society (1993); MIT School of Science Teaching Prize (1993) MacVicar Faculty Fellow (1998)
- Scientific career
- Fields: Physical chemist
- Workplaces: NIST; MIT

Sylvia Teresse Ceyer is a professor of chemistry at MIT, holding the John C. Sheehan Chair in Chemistry. Until 2006, she held the chemistry chair of the National Academy of Sciences.

== Early life and education ==
Ceyer graduated from Hope College in Holland, Michigan in 1974 with an A.B. in chemistry. In 1979, she was awarded a Ph.D. in chemistry from the University of California, Berkeley. Her advisors were Y. T. Lee and Gabor Somorjai. She was a postdoctoral fellow at the National Bureau of Standards (now the National Institute of Standards and Technology) from 1979 to 1981.

== Career ==
=== MIT professor ===
Ceyer joined the MIT faculty in 1981 as assistant professor, becoming tenured in 1987 and reaching full professor in 1990.

In 1994, Ceyer was one of 16 women faculty in the School of Science at MIT who drafted and co-signed a letter to the then-Dean of Science (and later Chancellor of UC Berkeley) Robert Birgeneau, which started a campaign to highlight and challenge gender discrimination at MIT.

In 2004, MIT was conducting a search for a new president, and she was appointed to the Faculty Advisory Committee to the MIT Corporation. The Corporation chose Susan Hockfield, a neurobiologist from Yale University to be MIT's next president.

The following year, she was appointed associate head of MIT's chemistry department.

On July 1, 2010, she became head of the chemistry department, saying "It is my goal to further the Department of Chemistry's commitment to outstanding chemical research and education as set by a long line of distinguished department heads and faculty."

=== Research ===
Ceyer is a physical chemist whose main research interests lie in the interactions of molecules with surfaces. This work is done in an ultra-high vacuum environment, because ambient gasses or liquids would otherwise modify the surface under study. This allows unambiguous identification of the reactive species and processes of interest. These surfaces can be templates for nanomechanical devices or catalysts for chemical reactions. The central theme to her work is understanding of the so-called "pressure-gap", the disparity observed between reactions that occur under high pressure and the corresponding lack of reaction observed under ultra-high vacuum conditions.

Her contributions to surface science include discovery of collision induced processes at surfaces, in which an energetic, neutral, noble gas atom impinges on a surface pre-covered with an adsorbate, causing a reaction to occur between the surface and the adsorbate. The reactions observed include dissociation, desorption, and absorption into the bulk of the substrate. In addition, she discovered that electron energy loss spectroscopy can be used to detect species absorbed in the bulk of a substrate, and can be used to differentiate between bulk and surface species. This paved the way for her discovery that hydrogen atoms absorbed in the bulk of a nickel sample are the key reactant in the hydrogenation of unsaturated hydrocarbons. Another major discovery involved the reaction of fluorine molecules with a silicon surface (a reaction that is key to semiconductor device etching), in which the silicon surface abstracts a fluorine atom from the incident fluorine molecule, and the remaining fluorine atom scatters into the gas phase. This is the reverse of the Eley-Rideal mechanism, one of the fundamental mechanism of gas-surface chemical reactions.

=== Honors and awards ===
Prior to holding the John C. Sheehan Chair in Chemistry, Ceyer held the Class of 1943 Career Development Chair from 1985 to 1988 and the W. M. Keck Foundation Professorship in Energy from 1991 to 1996.

In 1988, she was awarded the Harold E. Edgerton Award, the Baker Memorial Award for Excellence in Undergraduate teaching and the Young Scholar Award from the American Association of University Women. In 1993, Ceyer was given the Nobel Laureate Signature Award from the American Chemical Society and the School of Science Teaching Prize. She was a MacVicar Faculty Fellow in 1998.

Ceyer is a fellow of the National Academy of Sciences, the American Physical Society and the American Academy of Arts and Sciences. She has held the Langmuir Lectureship of the American Chemical Society and the Welch Foundation Lectureship.

She was presented with the Willard Gibbs Award on May 26, 2007, for her research on heterogeneous catalysis.

=== Selected publications ===
- Lahr, D. L.; S. T. Ceyer (2006). "Catalyzed CO Oxidation at 70 K on an Extended Au/Ni Surface Alloy". J. Am. Chem. Soc. 128 (6): 1800–1801. doi:10.1021/ja053866j. PMID 16464073.
- Holt, J. R.; R. C. Hefty; M. R. Tate; S. T. Ceyer (2002). "Comparison of the Interactions of XeF_{2} and F_{2} with Si(100)2x1". J. Phys. Chem. B. 106 (33): 8399–8406. doi:10.1021/jp020936p.
- Ceyer, S. T. (2001). "The Unique Chemistry of Hydrogen Beneath the Surface: Catalytic Hydrogenation of Hydrocarbons". Acc. Chem. Res. 34 (9): 737–744. doi:10.1021/ar970030f. PMID 11560473.
- Tate, M. R.; D. P. Pullman; Y. L. Li; D. Gosalvez-Blanco; A. A. Tsekouras; S. T. Ceyer (15 March 2000). "Fluorine Atom Abstraction by Si(100): II. Model". J. Chem. Phys. 112 (11): 5190–5204. Bibcode:2000JChPh.112.5190T. doi:10.1063/1.481092. S2CID 96179157.
- Tate, M. R.; D. B. Gosalvez; D. P. Pullman; A. A. Tsekouras; Y. L. Li; J. J. Yang; K. B. Laughlin; S. C. Eckman; M. F. Bertino; S. T. Ceyer (1999). "Fluorine Atom Abstraction by Si(100): I. Experimental". J. Chem. Phys. 111 (8): 3679. Bibcode:1999JChPh.111.3679T. doi:10.1063/1.479677.
- Haug, K. L.; T. Bürgi; T. R. Trautman; S. T. Ceyer (1998). "The Distinctive Reactivities of Surface-Bound H and Bulk H for the Catalytic Hydrogenation of Acetylene". J. Am. Chem. Soc. 120 (34): 8885. doi:10.1021/ja9819615.
- Li, Y. L.; D. P. Pullman; J. J. Yang; A. A. Tsekouras; D. B. Gosalvez; K. B. Laughlin; Z. Zhang; M. T. Schulberg; D. J. Gladstone; M. McGonigal; S. T. Ceyer (1995). "A New Mechanism for Dissociative Chemisorption: Atom Abstraction from F_{2} by Si(100)". Phys. Rev. Lett. 74 (13): 2603–2606. Bibcode:1995PhRvL..74.2603L. doi:10.1103/PhysRevLett.74.2603. PMID 10057969.
- Johnson, A. D.; S. P. Daley; A. L. Utz; S. T. Ceyer (July 1992). "The Chemistry of Bulk Hydrogen: Reaction of H Embedded in Ni with Adsorbed CH_{3}". Science. 257 (5067): 223–225. Bibcode:1992Sci...257..223J. doi:10.1126/science.257.5067.223. PMID 17794753. S2CID 206574925.
- Johnson, A. D.; K. J. Maynard; S. P. Daley; Q. Y. Yang; S. T. Ceyer (12 Aug 1991). "Hydrogen Embedded in Ni: Production by Incident Atomic Hydrogen and Detection by High Resolution Electron Energy Loss". Phys. Rev. Lett. 67 (7): 927–930. Bibcode:1991PhRvL..67..927J. doi:10.1103/PhysRevLett.67.927. PMID 10045024.
- Ceyer, S. T. (July 1990). "New Mechanisms for Chemistry at Surfaces". Science. 249 (4965): 133–139. Bibcode:1990Sci...249..133C. doi:10.1126/science.249.4965.133. PMID 17836965. S2CID 42965193.
- Beckerle, J. D.; A. D. Johnson; Q. Y. Yang; S. T. Ceyer (1989). "Collision Induced Dissociative Chemisorption of CH_{4} on Ni(111) by Inert Gas Atoms: The Mechanism for Chemistry with a Hammer". J. Chem. Phys. 91 (9): 5756. Bibcode:1989JChPh..91.5756B. doi:10.1063/1.457529.
