= Vicki Grassian =

American chemist

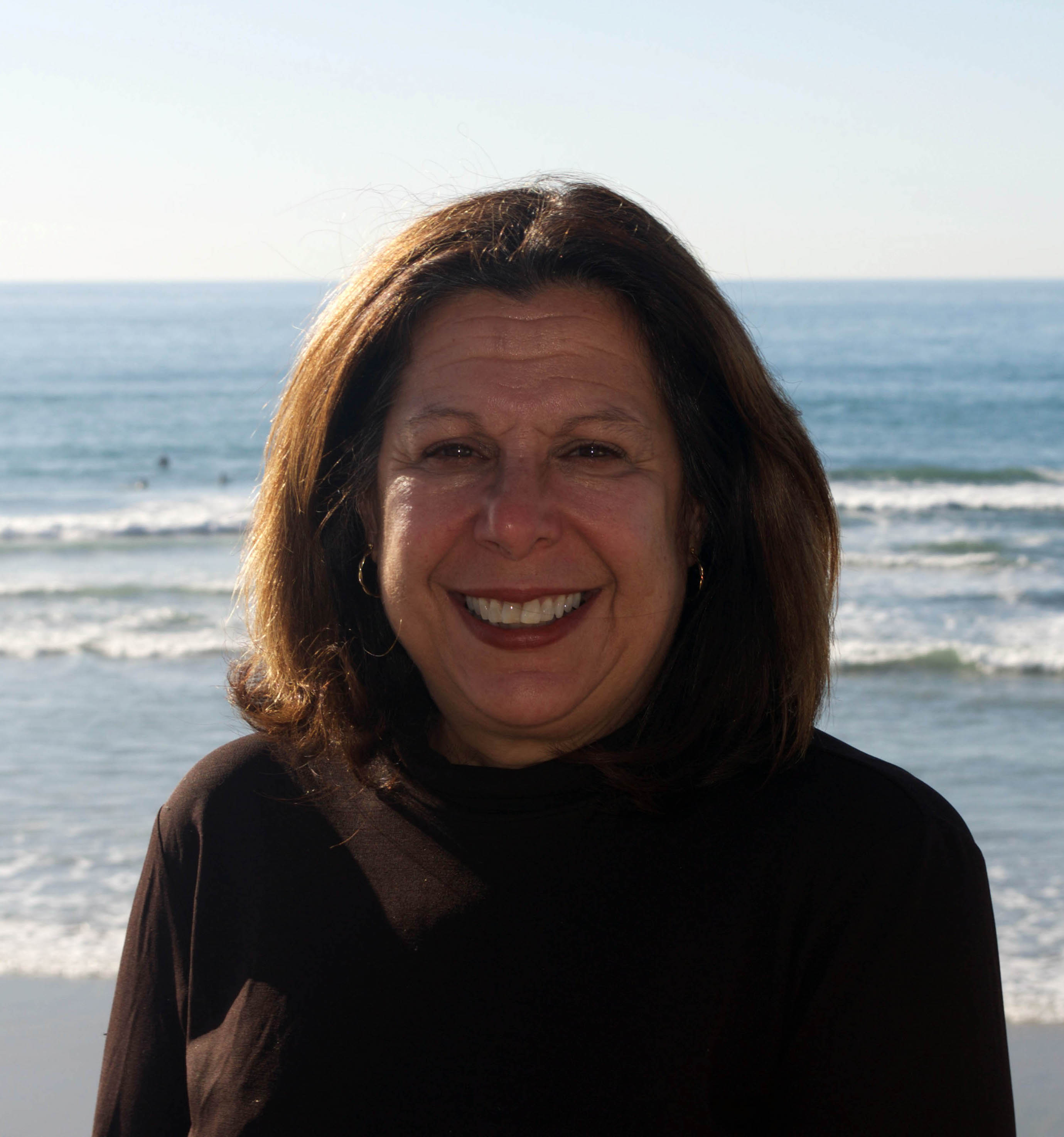
- Grassian in 2017
- Education: University of New York at Albany Rensselaer Polytechnic Institute University of California, Berkeley
- Scientific career
- Workplaces: University of Iowa; University of California, San Diego
- Doctoral advisor: George C. Pimentel
- Doctoral students: Hind Al-Abadleh

Vicki H. Grassian is a distinguished professor in the department of chemistry and biochemistry at the University of California, San Diego. She also holds the distinguished chair in physical chemistry.

Grassian has been called "the Dust Queen" for her work on atmospheric dust. Her research group focuses on the chemistry and impacts of environmental surfaces and interfaces, including atmospheric aerosols (mineral dust, sea spray), aqueous microdroplets, nanomaterials and the chemistry of indoor surfaces. She has won many awards, including a 2018 Chemical Pioneer Award from the American Institute of Chemists.

== Education ==
Grassian studied chemistry at the University of New York at Albany, graduating in 1981. She moved to the Rensselaer Polytechnic Institute for her master's degree, which she completed in 1982. She earned her PhD at the University of California, Berkeley in 1987. Her PhD supervisor was George C. Pimentel.

== Career ==
External videos
- “What’s really in the air we breathe”, TEDxSanDiego, January 3, 2018

In 1990 Grassian joined the faculty of the University of Iowa, where she earned a General Electric Foundation Faculty Fellowship. She began to research the reactions between trace atmospheric gases (i.e. nitrogen oxides and volatile organic compounds) and mineral dust. There are several particles in the Earth's atmosphere, mostly consisting of mineral dust and sea spray, and their surfaces have the ability to influence the Earth's climate. Grassian has become one of the world's leading scientists studying the environmental reactions on oxide and carbonate surfaces. She demonstrated that during the daytime, mineral dust aerosols can convert nitrogen dioxide into nitrous acid. Aerosols can be generated in volcanoes, wildfires, coal-fired power plants and vehicles.

Grassian was appointed full professor and won the Distinguished Achievement Award in 2002. She was named the F. Wendell Miller Chair in Chemistry and Director Nanoscience and Nanotechnology Institute in 2010. She was appointed co-director of the National Science Foundation Center for Aerosol Impacts on Chemistry of the Environment (CAICE). She was made a Fellow of the Royal Society of Chemistry in 2010 and the American Chemical Society in 2011.

From 2013-2017, Grassian was the inaugural Editor-in-Chief of Environmental Science: Nano a new journal from the Royal Society of Chemistry (RSC) Publishing and held that appointment for five years. She also served as an editor of Surface Science Reports. She won the University of Iowa Scholar of the Year Award in 2014. She mentored over 300 students in her laboratory. She became a Chartered Chemist in 2015.

In 2016 Grassian moved to the University of California San Diego where she leads the Grassian Research Group. Her research group focuses on the chemistry and impacts of environmental interfaces including atmospheric aerosols (mineral dust, sea spray), aqueous microdroplets, nanomaterials and indoor surfaces. They examine the applications, implications, and toxicity of metal and metal oxide nanoparticles. Her team researches the chemistry of indoor surfaces, including the interactions of indoor gases with components of paints (titanium dioxide), glass, concrete, and drywall. Grassian collaborates with scientists at the Scripps Hydraulics Lab to study particles generated in sea spray. By researching the properties of sea spray aerosol, such as hygroscopicity and chemical reactivity, Grassian looks to develop an understanding of our atmosphere that will help improve current climate models. In 2017 she helped identify that the bubbles that appear on the surface of breaking waves forms particulate matter that depends on molecules secreted by phytoplankton and floor dwelling bacteria for its overall composition. She gave a TEDTalk What's Really in the Air We Breathe at TEDxSan Diego in 2018.

=== Awards ===
- 2025 ACS PHYS Division - Marsha I. Lester Award for Exemplary Impact in Physical Chemistry
- 2024 Pittsburgh Spectroscopy Award
- 2023 American Chemical Society Geochemistry Division Medal
- 2021 American Chemical Society National Award in Surface Chemistry
- 2021 National Science Foundation Distinguished Lecturer in Mathematical and Physical Sciences
- 2020 Sustainable Nanotechnology Organization Award
- 2020 American Academy of Arts and Sciences Elected Member
- 2020 Iota Sigma Pi Honorary Member Award
- 2019 IUPAC Distinguished Women in Chemistry or Chemical Engineering Award
- 2019 William H. Nichols Medal
- 2018 American Institute of Chemists Chemical Pioneer Award
- 2018 American Chemical Society Committee on Environmental Improvement Award for Incorporation of Sustainability into Chemistry Education
- 2014 Royal Society of Chemistry John Jeyes Award
- 2014 American Chemical Society Midwest Award
- 2012 American Chemical Society Creative Advanced in Environmental Science and Technology
