= Elizabeth Noble Shor =

American historian

- Betty Shor in 1977.
- Born: Elizabeth Louise Noble; April 21, 1930; Boston, Massachusetts
- Died: October 13, 2013 (aged 83); Honolulu, Hawaii, U.S.
- Education: Pasadena City College, Wellesley College
- Spouse: George G. Shor (m. 1950)
- Scientific career
- Fields: History of science
- Workplaces: Scripps Institution of Oceanography

Elizabeth Noble Shor (April 21, 1930 – October 13, 2013) was an American historian and scientist. Her entire career was at the Scripps Institution of Oceanography in La Jolla, California. Shor was a noted historian for the institution.

== Early life and education ==
Elizabeth Louise Noble ("Betty Lou" or "Betty") was born in Boston on April 21, 1930. Her father was James Alexander Noble, a professor of geology, and her mother was Marion Louise Goldthwaite. She spent most of her childhood in South Dakota, however, after her father became chief geologist for the Homestake Mining Company there. She graduated high school in Lead, South Dakota, as valedictorian. Her family moved to Pasadena, California, after her father became a professor of mining geology at the California Institute of Technology (Caltech) in 1947. She attended Pasadena City College for a year, before transferring to Wellesley College in Wellesley, Massachusetts to study zoology for two years.

Shor met her husband George Shor while he was a student at Caltech. Shor married George Shor in Pasadena and the couple moved to Texas in 1950. After a time working in oil exploration in Texas, George Shor returned again to Caltech in 1951 for his doctoral work in seismology and geology under Charles Richter, obtaining his degree in 1954. Her husband's doctoral work employed explosive shots to make measurements of the Mohorovičić discontinuity, the boundary layer between the Earth's crust and mantle. In 1952 a major earthquake flooded the Richter laboratory with more data than they could handle. While Shor was visiting the laboratory with her infant son, she began asking questions about the work, and Richter hired her as a laboratory assistant. Such a paid job in science was unusual for women at the time, and it provided Shor an entrance into a career of laboratory work.

Shor followed her husband to the Scripps Institution of Oceanography in 1953.

== Career at Scripps ==
When the Shors arrived at Scripps in 1953, the Scripps community was small and close knit. The Scripps population in 1952, including scientists, staff, and students, numbered 415 people and Roger Revelle was director. Shor joined the lively wives support group Oceanids, which was to have a large impact on life at Scripps, as well as its institutions, and that of the University of California at San Diego when it was founded a decade later. Shor played an active role in community activities, developed an interest in historical writing, and continued her career as a laboratory assistant. Shor wrote a history of Oceanids in 1982. Her experience and knowledge of the history of Scripps was recognized. As subsequent Scripps historian Deborah Cozort Day commented, "Betty was the walking memory of the institution."

=== Working for Carl L. Hubbs ===
Beginning in 1962, Shor worked as laboratory assistant for ichthyologist Carl L. Hubbs at Scripps. After his death in 1979 she maintained his files and library, transferring them to the Scripps archives in 1980. With R. H. Rosenblatt and J. D. Isaacs, Shor co-wrote a biography of Hubbs for the National Academy of Sciences published in 1987.

=== Project Mohole ===
Project Mohole aimed to obtain a sample of the Mohorovičić discontinuity (Moho) by drilling from a deep-ocean region. Below continents the discontinuity is too deep to be reached by drilling, but below deep-ocean regions it is shallower. Nevertheless, deep-ocean drilling had never before been successful, and the project would have to drill an additional 3–6 miles below the sea floor to reach the Moho. The project was initially led by a group of scientists called the American Miscellaneous Society with funding from the National Science Foundation. The group included Walter Munk and Roger Revelle at Scripps.

After the project won an initial grant for exploratory study in 1958, Shor's husband became involved because of his recent work on seismic measurements of the Moho discontinuity. Indeed, he was able to suggest the first suitable drilling site near Guadalupe Island, Mexico. George Shor served as a principal investigator for the project. He and Russell Raitt contributed to several Mohole committees and led expeditions to the Hawaiian Islands to determine the best drilling location for the project. The project suffered from political and scientific opposition, mismanagement, and cost overruns. The U.S. House of Representatives defunded it in 1966. Shor developed a lengthy chronology of the debacle.

=== A history of Scripps ===
Shor was hired by then director William Nierenberg to write a history of Scripps. She published a definitive history of the institution in 1978, Scripps Institution of Oceanography: Probing the Oceans 1936 to 1976. In the process of collecting material for this book, she also established the archives for the entire Scripps institution.

=== Scripps expeditions ===
Throughout his career at Scripps, Shor's husband served as chief scientist on many research expeditions worldwide, beginning with geophysical expeditions to the Gulf of Alaska. He conducted the first expedition to the Indian Ocean by Scripps in 1960. From 1971 to 1992 Shor frequently accompanied him on expeditions; she was an active participant of the cruises.

== Honor ==
Shor's contributions to Scripps and oceanography were honored when the Scripps Institution of Oceanography named a guyot, a flat topped seamount, after her. Betty Guyot is located at 29°20'N, 174°00'W to the northwest of the Hawaiian Islands in the Central Pacific.

== Personal life ==
Shor was married to Scripps geophysicist George Shor for 59 years. They had a daughter and two sons.

Shor and her husband developed an interest in bamboo, including its use as a structural material for flooring, furniture and other applications. They were active members of the American Bamboo Society for many years.

Betty retired from Scripps in 1983, while maintaining her activity for the institution.

George Shor died on July 3, 2009, age 86, at home in La Jolla, California, from complications following several strokes. Betty Shor died, age 83, on October 13, 2013, at her son's home in Honolulu, Hawaii.

== Books ==
- Elizabeth Noble Shor, Fossils and Flies: The life of a compleat [sic] scientist Samuel Wendell Williston (1851-1918), University of Oklahoma Press (Norman, OK), 1971, 285 pp. ISBN 978-0806109497
- Elizabeth Noble Shor, The fossil feud between E. D. Cope and O. C. Marsh, Exposition Press, 1974, xii+340 pp. ISBN 978-0682479417
- Elizabeth Noble Shor, Dinner in the morning: A collection of breakfast and brunch recipes, Tofua Press (San Diego), 1977, 85 pp. ISBN 978-0914488125
- Elizabeth Noble Shor, Scripps Institution of Oceanography: Probing the Oceans, 1936-1976, Tofua Press (San Diego), 1978, 502 pp. ISBN 978-0914488170
- Marine Geophysics: A Navy Symposium, Elizabeth N. Shor and Carolyn L. Ebrahimi, eds., 1987, Scripps Institution of Oceanography, Link, 20 pp.
- Wolf H. Berger and E. N. Shor, Ocean: Reflections on a Century of Exploration, University of California Press (Berkeley and Los Angeles), 2009, 536 pp. ISBN 978-0520247789
