= William H. Nichols Medal =

- Date: 1902
- Presented by: American Chemical Society, New York Local Section
- Website: http://www.newyorkacs.org/meetings/Nominations/Nichols.php

The William H. Nichols Medal is awarded annually for original research in chemistry. Nominees must have made a "significant and original contribution in any field of chemistry" during the five years preceding the presentation date. The medallist receives a gold medal, a bronze replica and a cash award. The award was established in 1902 by the New York Section of the American Chemical Society (ACS) through a gift from chemist and businessman William H. Nichols. It was the first award to be approved by the ACS. The medal was first awarded in 1903.

== Recipients ==
The award is given yearly and was first presented in 1903.

- 1903 Edward B. Voorhees
- 1904 (no award given)
- 1905 Charles L. Parsons
- 1906 Marston T. Bogert
- 1907 Howard B. Bishop
- 1908 William Hultz Walker
- 1909 H. H. C. P. Weber
- 1909 William A. Noyes
- 1910 L. H. Baekeland
- 1911 C. W. Easley
- 1911 M. A. Rosanof
- 1912 Charles James
- 1913 (no award given)
- 1914 Moses Gomberg
- 1915 Irving Langmuir
- 1916 Claude S. Hudson
- 1917 (no award given)
- 1918 Treat Baldwin Johnson
- 1919 (no award given)
- 1920 Irving Langmuir
- 1921 Gilbert N. Lewis
- 1922 (no award given)
- 1923 Thomas Midgley Jr.
- 1924 Charles A. Kraus
- 1925 Edward Curtis Franklin
- 1926 S. C. Lind
- 1927 Roger Adams
- 1928 Hugh S. Taylor
- 1929 William L. Evans
- 1930 Samuel E. Sheppard
- 1931 John A. Wilson
- 1932 James B. Conant
- 1933 (no award given)
- 1934 Henry C. Sherman
- 1935 Julius A. Nieuwland
- 1936 William M. Clark
- 1937 Frank C. Whitmore
- 1938 P. A. Levene
- 1939 Joel H. Hildebrand
- 1940 John M. Nelson
- 1941 Linus Pauling
- 1942 Duncan A. MacInnes
- 1943 Arthur B. Lamb
- 1944 Carl S. Marvel
- 1945 Vincent du Vigneaud
- 1946 Wendell M. Stanley
- 1947 George B. Kistiakowski
- 1948 Glenn T. Seaborg
- 1949 I. M. Kolthoff
- 1950 Oskar Wintersteiner
- 1951 Henry Eyring
- 1952 Frank H. Spedding
- 1953 Reynold C. Fuson
- 1954 Charles P. Smyth
- 1955 Wendell M. Latimer
- 1956 Robert Burns Woodward
- 1957 Louis P. Hammett
- 1958 Melvin Calvin
- 1959 Herbert C. Brown
- 1960 Herman F. Mark
- 1961 Peter J. W. Debye
- 1962 Paul J. Flory
- 1963 Louis F. Fieser
- 1964 Arthur C. Cope
- 1965 Herbert E. Carter
- 1966 Frederick D. Rossini
- 1967 Karl Folkers
- 1968 William S. Johnson
- 1969 Marshall Nirenberg
- 1970 Britton Chance
- 1971 Henry Taube
- 1972 John D. Roberts
- 1973 R. Bruce Merrifield
- 1974 Harold A. Scheraga
- 1975 F. Albert Cotton
- 1976 Paul D. Bartlett
- 1977 Elias J. Corey
- 1978 Frank Alden Bovey
- 1979 Choh Hao Li
- 1980 Gilbert Stork
- 1981 Roald Hoffmann
- 1982 Frank H. Westheimer
- 1983 Neil Bartlett
- 1984 Fred W. McLafferty
- 1985 Jerome A. Berson
- 1986 Michael J. S. Dewar
- 1987 Kurt Mislow
- 1988 Ralph F. Hirschmann
- 1989 Ronald Breslow
- 1990 John D. Baldeschwieler
- 1991 J. Calvin Giddings
- 1992 Koji Nakanishi
- 1993 Richard E. Smalley
- 1994 Peter B. Dervan
- 1995 Stephen J. Lippard
- 1996 K. C. Nicolaou
- 1997 Jacqueline K. Barton
- 1998 Ahmed H. Zewail
- 1999 Samuel J. Danishefsky
- 2000 Barry M. Trost
- 2001 Stuart L. Schreiber
- 2002 Alan G. MacDiarmid
- 2003 Harry Gray
- 2004 Allen J. Bard
- 2005 Richard N. Zare
- 2006 K. Barry Sharpless
- 2007 Nicholas J. Turro
- 2008 Nadrian C. Seeman
- 2009 Carolyn R. Bertozzi
- 2010 Tobin J. Marks
- 2011 Julius Rebek (Jr.)
- 2012 Alan G. Marshall
- 2013 Richard Eisenberg
- 2014 Amos Smith (III)
- 2015 Gabor A. Somorjai
- 2016 Stephen L. Buchwald
- 2017 Chad Mirkin
- 2018 Debra R. Rolison
- 2019 Vicki Grassian
- 2020 Krzysztof Matyjaszewski
- 2021 (No award given)
- 2022 Alison Butler
- 2023 Karen Goldberg
- 2024 Emily A. Carter
- 2025 Benjamin Cravatt III

== See also ==
- List of chemistry awards
