= Rolinda, California =

Unincorporated community in California, United States

Rolinda
- Unincorporated community
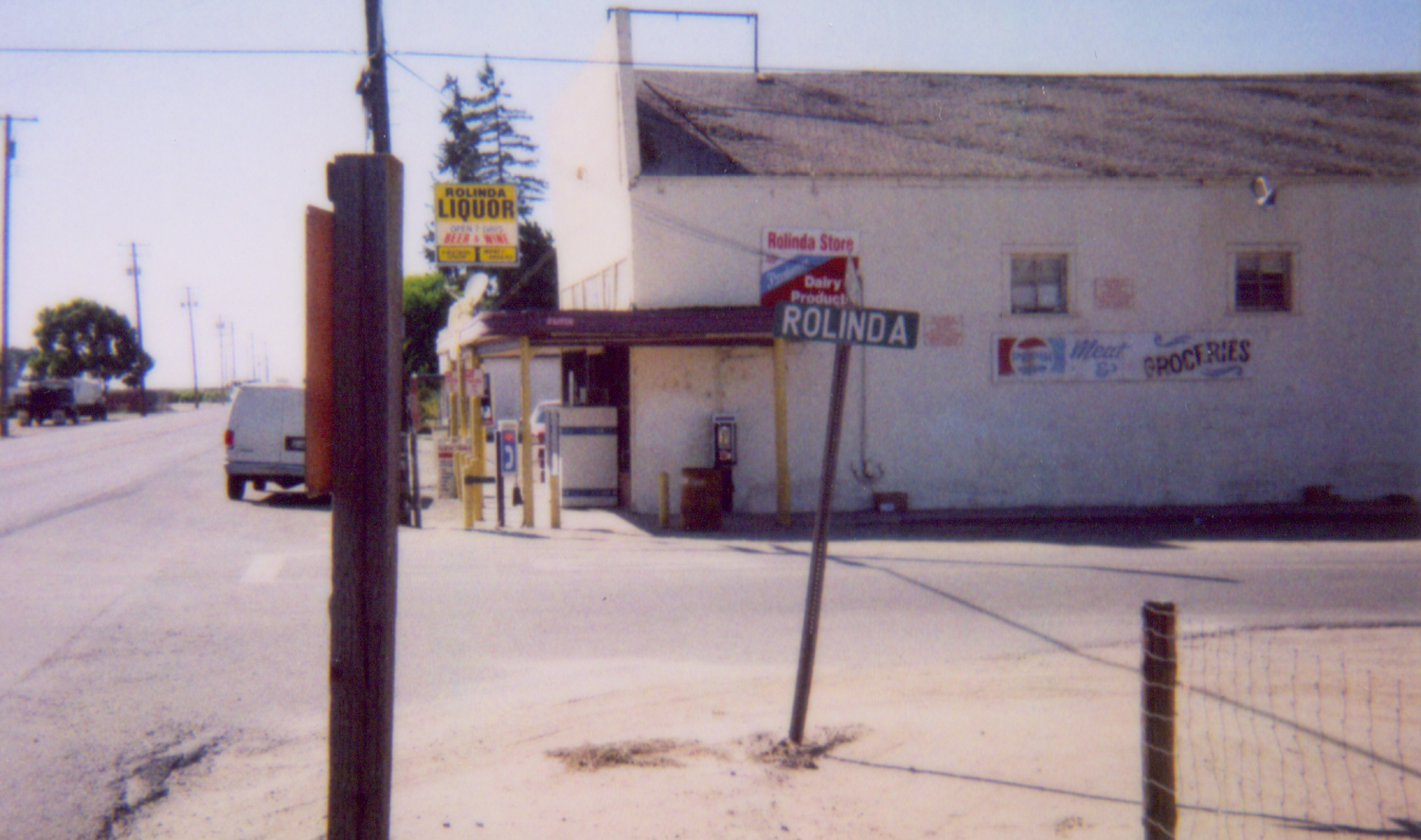
- Rolinda Store (a.k.a. Rolinda Liquor), a community landmark

- Location in California Rolinda (the United States)
- Coordinates: 36°44′07″N 119°57′43″W
- Country: United States
- State: California
- County: Fresno
- Elevation: 253 ft (77 m)

Rolinda is a small unincorporated agricultural community in Fresno County, California, United States. It is located along State Route 180, 10 miles (16 km) west of downtown Fresno, at an elevation of 253 feet (77 m). Official U.S. Geological Survey coordinates for the community are 36°44′07″N 119°57′43″W. The community is in area code 559. It does not have its own ZIP code and mail uses the Fresno ZIP code of 93706.

Surrounding the small community is mostly irrigated, agricultural land, prominently growing Thompson seedless grapes used for raisins. Row crops include feed crops such as alfalfa. It is common to see cattle egrets patrolling the fields for insect life. Raptors including red-shouldered hawks are also widely visible during daylight hours.

A landmark south of town is the Houghton-Kearney Elementary School, 8905 West Kearney Boulevard, operated by the K-12 Central Unified School District. This school was preceded by the Houghton School at 9128 West Whitesbridge Road, where the old bus barn still stands although that school closed in 1953. A post office operated at Rolinda from 1895 to 1902.
