= Geary, Kansas =

Ghost town in Doniphan County, Kansas

Coordinates: 39°40′28″N 95°01′54″W

Geary is a ghost town in Wayne Township, Doniphan County, Kansas, United States.

== History ==
Geary was laid out in 1857. It was named for John W. Geary, third Territorial Governor of Kansas.

The second building in town was a newspaper office for the ERA, which was edited by a Free-State Democrat editor, a Republican editor, and a Know-Nothing editor. The newspaper ended in the summer of 1858.

A post office was established at Geary in 1857 and remained in operation until it was discontinued in 1905.

While there was little border war fighting in Geary, a Jayhawker named "Chandler" was shot and died in Geary in 1862. He was buried in an unmarked grave south of the town.

Geary flourished temporarily during the connection of the railroad from Wathena to Doniphan, but the railroad was abandoned and only a church and a store remained by 1907.

== See also ==
- List of ghost towns in Kansas
