= Cold rubber =

Synthetic rubber material

Cold rubber, or cold polymerized rubber, is synthetic rubber (especially, SBR and NBR) emulsion polymerized at a relatively low temperature.

Cold rubber may be polymerized at temperatures of about -18°C to 5°C, as opposed to "hot rubber" polymerized at higher temperatures around 50°C. The polymerizing temperature is approximately 5°C in the case of SBR and 5~10°C in the case of NBR. Except some SBR and NBR used for special purposes, most SBR and NBR available in the market are considered cold rubber.

Since rubber molecule types have a smaller number of branches than hot rubber and are characterized by good stereoregularity, cold rubber has superior processability as well as the ability to produce vulcanized materials with good tensile strength, expansion and aging resistance, and flex resistance.

== History ==
Germany developed a polymerization process for cold rubber during World War II using sugar, organic peroxide, and iron, allowing rubber to be mixed between 0-10°C. The rubber produced from this process showed improvements in tensile strength and resistance to wear. After the war, research director Ralph Rowzee of the Canadian petrochemical company Polymer traveled to Germany as part of Combined Intelligence Objectives Subcommittee, an Allied program to investigate and report back on German scientific discoveries during the war.

Polymer donated the polymerization recipe to the Reconstruction Finance Corporation, and several North American petrochemical companies used this formula to manufacture their own versions of cold rubber. In the United States, the RFC launched a $3.5 million program in 1948 to boost the production of cold rubber, citing its better performance in tire treads.

However, tire manufacturers found the new rubber to be hard to process. In 1948, researcher Emmet Pfau of BFGoodrich tested a method of manufacturing rubber that added oil to the mix as an extender, lowering production costs and making the resultant rubber more plastic. BFGoodrich was uninterested in his findings, however, and Pfau left the company to join General Tire. General Tire, in collaboration with Polymer, began production of what would be called Polysar Krynol by 1951.
