= Reynold C. Fuson =

American chemist (1895–1979)

- Born: Reynold Clayton Fuson; June 1, 1895; Wakefield, Illinois, U.S.
- Died: August 4, 1979 (aged 84); Urbana, Illinois, U.S.
- Education: University of Minnesota
- Awards: William H. Nichols Medal (1953)
- Scientific career
- Workplaces: University of Illinois, University of Nevada
- Doctoral students: George Parshall; James P. Collman

Reynold Clayton Fuson (June 1, 1895 – August 4, 1979) was an American chemist.

== Biography ==
Born in Wakefield, Illinois, Fuson attended Central Normal College in Danville, Indiana, where after one year in 1914 he was certified as a teacher. He received a Bachelor's degree in chemistry from the University of Montana, a Master's degree from the University of California, Berkeley, and a Ph.D. from the University of Minnesota.

He accepted a postdoctoral appointment at Harvard University with E. P. Kohler and remained there to serve briefly as an instructor. He joined the Department of Chemistry at the University of Illinois in 1927. He retired in 1963 after thirty-five years as a distinguished teacher and researcher.

After retirement from the University of Illinois, Fuson spent fourteen years at the University of Nevada as a distinguished visiting professor and then as a professor emeritus.

Fuson published 285 scientific articles and wrote or co-wrote five textbooks, including The Systematic Identification of Organic Compounds with R. L. Shriner and later including David Curtin and remains in print today with additional authors.

Fuson’s research interests were wide-ranging. He enunciated the principle of vinylogy which is now taught in terms of resonance in valence bond theory, elucidated the mechanism of the conjugate addition of Grignard reagents to unsaturated carbonyls compounds, and discovered stable enols and enediols of sterically hindered molecules.

Fuson’s accomplishments were recognized by membership in the National Academy of Sciences. He received the Nichols Medal, the Manufacturing Chemists' Association Award for College Teaching, and the John R. Kuebler Award of Alpha Chi Sigma. He was a member of the editorial boards of Organic Syntheses and the Journal of the American Chemical Society.
