= American Miscellaneous Society =

Informal scientific organization

The American Miscellaneous Society (AMSOC – 1952 to 1964) was an informal group made up of members of the US scientific community. It was formed by Gordon Lill, of the Office of Naval Research, as an organization designed to collect various Earth science research ideas that were submitted by scientists to the U.S. Navy and did not fit into any particular category. Membership in AMSOC was open to everyone and so there was no official membership list. Prospective members could join whenever two or more members were together. The most famous project to come out of AMSOC was the Project Mohole, whose goal was to drill into the Earth's mantle. Hollis Hedberg of Gulf Oil Corporation chaired the AMSOC Mohole subcommittee from 1962 to 1963. The society dissolved itself in 1964.
