= Presidents of the American Chemical Society =

Presidents of the American Chemical Society:

- John W. Draper (1876)
- J. Lawrence Smith (1877)
- Samuel William Johnson (1878)
- T. Sterry Hunt (1879)
- Frederick A. Genth (1880)
- Charles F. Chandler (1881)
- John W. Mallet (1882)
- James C. Booth (1883)
- Albert B. Prescott (1886)
- Charles Anthony Goessmann (1887)
- T. Sterry Hunt (1888)
- Charles F. Chandler (1889)
- Henry B. Nason (1890)
- George F. Barker (1891)
- George C. Caldwell (1892)
- Harvey W. Wiley (1893)
- Edgar Fahs Smith (1895)
- Charles B. Dudley (1896)
- Charles E. Munroe (1898)
- Edward W. Morley (1899)
- William McMurtrie (1900)
- Frank W. Clarke (1901)
- Ira Remsen (1902)
- John H. Long (1903)
- Arthur Amos Noyes (1904)
- Francis P. Venable (1905)
- William F. Hillebrand (1906)
- Marston T. Bogert (1907)
- Willis R. Whitney (1909)
- Wilder D. Bancroft (1910)
- Alexander Smith (1911)
- Arthur D. Little (1912)
- Theodore W. Richards (1914)
- Charles H. Herty (1915)
- Julius Stieglitz (1917)
- William H. Nichols (1918)
- William A. Noyes (1920)
- Edgar Fahs Smith (1921)
- Edward C. Franklin (1923)
- Leo H. Baekeland (1924)
- James Flack Norris (1925)
- George D. Rosengarten (1927)
- Samuel W. Parr (1928)
- Irving Langmuir (1929)
- William McPherson (1930)
- Moses Gomberg (1931)
- Lawrence V. Redman (1932)
- Arthur B. Lamb (1933)
- Charles L. Reese (1934)
- Roger Adams (1935)
- Edward Bartow (1936)
- Edward R. Weidlein (1937)
- Frank C. Whitmore (1938)
- Charles A. Kraus (1939)
- Samuel C. Lind (1940)
- William Lloyd Evans (1941)
- Harry N. Holmes (1942)
- Per K. Frolich (1943)
- Thomas Midgley Jr. (1944)
- Carl S. Marvel (1945)
- Bradley Dewey (1946)
- W. Albert Noyes Jr. (1947)
- Charles A. Thomas (1948)
- Linus Pauling (1949)
- Ernest H. Volwiler (1950)
- N. Howell Funnan (1951)
- Edgar C. Britton (1952)
- Farrington Daniels (1953)
- Harry L. Fisher (1954)
- Joel H. Hildebrand (1955)
- John C. Warner (1956)
- Roger J. Williams (1957)
- Clifford F. Rassweiler (1958)
- John C. Bailar Jr. (1959)
- Albert L. Elder (1960)
- Arthur C. Cope (1961)
- Karl Folkers (1962)
- Henry Eyring (1963)
- Maurice H. Arveson (1964)
- Charles C. Price (1965)
- William J. Sparks (1966)
- Charles G. Overberger (1967)
- Robert W. Cairns (1968)
- Wallace R. Brode (1969)
- Byron Riegel (1970)
- Melvin Calvin (1971)
- Max Tishler (1972)
- Alan C. Nixon (1973)
- Bernard S. Friedman (1974)
- William J. Bailey (1975)
- Glenn T. Seaborg (1976)
- Henry A. Hill (1977)
- Anna J. Harrison (1978)
- Gardner W. Stacy (1979)
- James D. D'Ianni (1980)
- Albert C. Zettlemoyer (1981)
- Robert W. Parry (1982)
- Fred Basolo (1983)
- Warren D. Niederhauser (1984)
- Ellis K. Fields (1985)
- George C. Pimentel (1986)
- Mary L. Good (1987)
- Gordon L. Nelson (1988)
- Clayton F. Callis (1989)
- Paul G. Gassman (1990)
- S. Allen Heininger (1991)
- Ernest L. Eliel (1992)
- Helen M. Free (1993)
- Ned D. Heindel (1994)
- Brian M. Rushton (1995)
- Ronald Breslow (1996)
- Paul S. Anderson (1997)
- Paul H.L. Walter (1998)
- Edel Wasserman (1999)
- Daryle H. Busch (2000)
- Attila E. Pavlath (2001)
- Eli M. Pearce (2002)
- Elsa Reichmanis (2003)
- Charles P. Casey (2004)
- William F. Carroll Jr. (2005)
- Elizabeth Ann Nalley (2006)
- Catherine T. Hunt (2007)
- Bruce E. Bursten (2008)
- Thomas H. Lane (2009)
- Joseph Francisco (2010)
- Nancy B. Jackson (2011)
- Bassam Z. Shakhashiri (2012)
- Marinda Li Wu (2013)
- Thomas J. Barton (2014)
- Diane Grob Schmidt (2015)
- Donna J. Nelson (2016)
- Allison A. Campbell (2017)
- Peter K. Dorhout (2018)
- Bonnie A. Charpentier (2019)
- Luis Echegoyen (2020)
- H.N. Cheng (2021)
- Angela K. Wilson (2022)
- Judith Giordan (2023)
- Mary K. Carroll (2024)
- Dorothy J. Phillips (2025)
- Rigoberto Hernandez (2026)
