= Haensel =

Haensel is a surname. Notable people with the surname include:

- Vladimir Haensel (1914–2002), American chemical engineer
- Paul Haensel (1878–1949), Russian/American financier, economist, and scholar
- Wayne Haensel (1936–2012), American football player and coach
