= List of Phi Lambda Upsilon chapters =

Phi Lambda Upsilon is an American college honor society for chemistry. It was founded in 1899 at the University of Illinois. Following are the chapters of Phi Lambda Upsilon, with active chapters inactive in bold and inactive chapters in italics.

Chapter	Charter date and range	Institution	Location	Status	Ref.
**Alpha**	March 1899	University of Illinois Urbana-Champaign	Urbana, Illinois	Active	
**Beta**	1906	University of Wisconsin–Madison	Madison, Wisconsin	Active	
**Gamma**	1909	Columbia University	New York City, New York	Active	
**Delta**	May 10, 1909	University of Michigan	Ann Arbor, Michigan	Active	
**Epsilon**	1910	University of Washington	Seattle, Washington	Active	
**Zeta**	1910	University of Minnesota	Minneapolis, Minnesota	Active	
**Eta**	1911	Ohio State University	Columbus, Ohio	Active	
**Theta**	1912	Iowa State University	Ames, Iowa	Active	
**Iota**	January 16, 1912	Stanford University	Palo Alto, California	Active	(Note: Chapter formed from Mim Kaph Mim, a local chemistry honor society.)
Kappa	1912	University of Denver	Denver, Colorado	Inactive	
Mim Kaph Mim	1913	University of California, Berkeley	Berkeley, California	Inactive	
**Mu**	1914	Pennsylvania State University	State College, Pennsylvania	Active	
**Nu**	January 19, 1917	Purdue University	West Lafayette, Indiana	Active	(Note: Chapter formed from the Kekule, a local group for junior and senior chemistry majors.)
**Xi**	1917	University of Pittsburgh	Pittsburgh, Pennsylvania	Active	
**Omicron**	1920	Illinois Institute of Technology	Chicago, Illinois	Active	
**Pi**	July 17, 1920	University of Texas at Austin	Austin, Texas	Active	(Note: Chapter formed from the campus Chemistry Club, formed in 1914.)
**Rho**	1922	University of Nebraska–Lincoln	Lincoln, Nebraska	Active	
**Sigma**	1922	Rutgers University–New Brunswick	Piscataway, New Jersey	Active	
**Tau**	1924	West Virginia University	Morgantown, West Virginia	Active	
**Upsilon**	1925	University of Iowa	Iowa City, Iowa	Active	
**Phi**	1926	University of Arizona	Tucson, Arizona	Active	
**Chi**	1926	Washington State University	Pullman, Washington	Active	
**Psi**	1926	University of Southern California	Los Angeles, California	Active	
**Omega**	1926	Indiana University Bloomington	Bloomington, Indiana	Active	
**Alpha Alpha**	1926	Rice University	Houston, Texas	Active	
**Alpha Beta**	1927	Oregon State University	Corvallis, Oregon	Active	
**Alpha Gamma**	1927	Northwestern University	Evanston, Illinois	Active	
**Alpha Delta**	May 20, 1929	Oklahoma State University	Stillwater, Oklahoma	Active	(Note: Chapter formed from Chi Sigma, a local chemistry fraternity.)
**Alpha Epsilon**	1931	Kansas State University	Manhattan, Kansas	Active	
**Alpha Zeta**	February 27, 1932	New York University Tandon School of Engineering	Brooklyn, New York	Active	(Note: Chapter formed at the Brooklyn Polytechnic Institute, which was absorbed by New York University to form the Tandon School of Engineering in 2008)
**Alpha Eta**	1932	Johns Hopkins University	Baltimore, Maryland	Active	
**Alpha Theta**	1933	Virginia Tech	Blacksburg, Virginia	Active	
**Alpha Iota**	1933	Auburn University	Auburn, Alabama	Active	
**Alpha Kappa**	1935	University of California, Los Angeles	Los Angeles, California	Active	
**Alpha Lambda**	1935	New York University	New York City, New York	Active	
**Alpha Mu**	1936	Louisiana State University	Baton Rouge, Louisiana	Active	
**Alpha Nu**	1939	Rensselaer Polytechnic Institute	Troy, New York	Active	
**Alpha Xi**	1939	University of Cincinnati	Cincinnati, Ohio	Active	
**Alpha Omicron**	1942	Michigan Technological University	Houghton, Michigan	Active	
**Alpha Pi**	1944	Duke University	Durham, North Carolina	Active	
**Alpha Rho**	1948	University of Kansas	Lawrence, Kansas	Active	
**Alpha Sigma**	1950	University of Colorado Boulder	Boulder, Colorado	Active	
**Alpha Tau**	1951	Syracuse University	Syracuse, New York	Active	
**Alpha Upsilon**	1951	University of Pennsylvania	Philadelphia, Pennsylvania	Active	
**Alpha Phi**	1951	University of Connecticut	Storrs, Connecticut	Active	
Alpha Chi	1951	Georgia Tech	Atlanta, Georgia	Inactive	
**Alpha Psi**	1952	Wayne State University	Detroit, Michigan	Active	
**Alpha Omega**	1952	University of Oklahoma	Norman, Oklahoma	Active	
**Beta Alpha**	1955	Massachusetts Institute of Technology	Cambridge, Massachusetts	Active	
**Beta Beta**	May 4, 1957	Texas A&M University	College Station, Texas	Active	
**Beta Gamma**	1959	Fordham University	New York City, New York	Active	
**Beta Delta**	1962	University of Louisville	Louisville, Kentucky	Active	
**Beta Epsilon**	1966	Drexel University	Philadelphia, Pennsylvania	Active	
**Beta Zeta**	1969	Worcester Polytechnic Institute	Worcester, Massachusetts	Active	
**Beta Eta**	1970	South Dakota State University	Brookings, South Dakota	Active	
**Beta Theta**	1971	Arizona State University	Tempe, Arizona	Active	
**Beta Iota**	1972	University of Missouri	Columbia, Missouri	Active	
**Beta Kappa**	October 1975	University of Scranton	Scranton, Pennsylvania	Active	
**Beta Lambda**	1976	North Carolina State University	Raleigh, North Carolina	Active	
**MAL**	1976	Membership-at-large		Active	
**Beta Mu**	1982	Southern Methodist University	Dallas, Texas	Active	
**Beta Nu**	1982	University of Miami	Coral Gables, Florida	Active	
**Beta Xi**	1984	Xavier University of Louisiana	New Orleans, Louisiana	Active	
**Beta Omicron**	1985	DePauw University	Greencastle, Indiana	Active	
**Beta Omicron**	1985	Wabash College	Crawfordsville, Indiana	Active	
**Beta Pi**	1986	St. Cloud State University	St. Cloud, Minnesota	Active	
**Beta Rho**	1986	Mississippi State University	Starkville, Mississippi	Active	(Note: Chapter formed from Mu Sigma Chi, a local chemistry honor society established in 1981.)
**Beta Sigma**	1991	Valparaiso University	Valparaiso, Indiana	Active	
**Beta Tau**	2003	University of Tulsa	Tulsa, Oklahoma	Active	
**Beta Upsilon**	2003	Kennesaw State University	Kennesaw, Georgia	Active	
**Beta Phi**	2004	Rockhurst University	Kansas City, Missouri	Active	
**Beta Chi**	2005	Allegheny College	Meadville, Pennsylvania	Active	
**Beta Psi**	2009	Siena University	Loudonville, New York	Active	
**Beta Omega**	2010	Winston-Salem State University	Winston-Salem, North Carolina	Active	
**Gamma Alpha**	2010	Elon University	Elon, North Carolina	Active	
**Gamma Beta**	2010	Ramapo College	Mahwah, New Jersey	Active	
**Gamma Gamma**	2016	University of Puerto Rico at Mayagüez	Mayagüez, Puerto Rico	Active	
**Gamma Delta**	2017	Delta State University	Cleveland, Mississippi	Active	
**Gamma Epsilon**	2017	Randolph–Macon College	Ashland, Virginia	Active	
