= Karen Goldberg =

American chemist

Karen Ila Goldberg
- Education: Barnard College A.B. 1983; University of California, Berkeley Ph.D. 1988
- Scientific career
- Fields: Organometallic Chemistry, Catalysis
- Workplaces: University of Pennsylvania University of Washington; Illinois State University Ohio State University
- Thesis: Synthetic and mechanistic studies of carbon-carbon and carbon-hydrogen bond formation and cleavage in transition metal systems (1988)
- Doctoral advisor: Robert G. Bergman
- Other academic advisors: Roald Hoffmann, Stephen J. Lippard, Bruce E. Bursten

Karen Ila Goldberg is an American chemist, currently the Vagelos Professor of Energy Research at University of Pennsylvania. Goldberg is most known for her work in inorganic and organometallic chemistry. Her most recent research focuses on catalysis, particularly on developing catalysts for oxidation, as well as the synthesis and activation of molecular oxygen. In 2018, Goldberg was elected to the National Academy of Sciences.

== Career ==
Karen Goldberg received her A.B. degree in Chemistry in 1983 from Barnard College of Columbia University. Her undergraduate research included work with Professors Roald Hoffmann, Stephen Lippard at Cornell University and Columbia University respectively, as well as with Doctors Tom Gradel and Steven Bertz at AT&T Laboratories. She earned her Ph.D. in Chemistry in 1988 with Professor Robert Bergman at the University of California at Berkeley. She completed a postdoctoral year under Professor Bruce Bursten at Ohio State University before becoming a faculty member of Illinois State University in 1989. In 1995, Goldberg began at the University of Washington as the Assistant Professor of Chemistry, and she was awarded tenure and promoted to Associate Professor in 2000, and to Professor in 2003. In 2017, Goldberg moved her research group to the University of Pennsylvania, where she is the Vagelos Professor of Energy Research in the department of chemistry.

== Research ==
Goldberg's research interests include understanding the mechanism and application of catalysts on fundamental organometallic reactions. This culminates into a goal to design more efficient, cheaper, and greener chemical products and fuels from a variety of feedstocks, such as alkanes. One such process that Goldberg has helped develop is the dehydrogenation of ammonia borane using an iridium pincer catalyst, a reaction that took place under mild conditions at high rates with efficient catalyst regeneration.

=== Electrophilic Oxidation Catalysis ===
Over thirty years ago, Alexander Shilov discovered the selective oxidization of alkanes in the presence of platinum-based metals. This was impractical because it required a stoichiometric oxidant in addition to the catalytic Pt(II) metal, which led Goldberg to inquire deeper into understanding C-H bond activation, oxidation, and C-heteroatom bond formation, leading to the development of more practical products. In recent studies of utilizing alkanes, Goldberg has investigated the functionalization of alkanes through oxidation reactions using platinum-based catalysts.

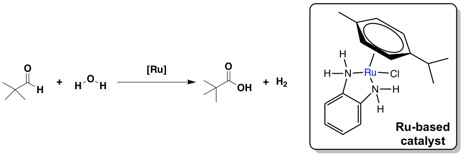
The reaction of pivaldehyde with water catalyzed by para-cymene Ru complexes to form a carboxylic acid and hydrogen gas.

Pt(II) methyl complexes are key intermediates in both the Shilov methane oxidation system and in more recent catalytic Pt methane oxidation systems. Goldberg's research involves formation of alcohols from alkanes using platinum or other late metal catalysts, including ruthenium, iridium and rhodium. As a result, her research discovered a method of using a family of Ru(II) diamine complexes as a precatalyst to provide selectivity and high conversion of aldehydes to carboxylic acids over the competing aldehyde disproportionation reaction.

Lithium aluminum hydride has widely been used as strong reducing reagent. However, it is difficult to reduce resonance stabilized carbonyl groups present in esters and lactones to alcohols. It was then that her research group came up with idea of hydrogenation of esters and lactones to form alcohol using base-free metal-catalyzed complexes. The catalyst that gave rise to a high yield of formate esters is a half-sandwich iridium bipyridine complex. The same half-sandwich complexes of iridium and rhodium were used as competent catalysts to hydrogenate carboxylic acids under relatively mild conditions. The mechanism behind this reaction involves hydride transfer from catalyst to formic acid as the main part of the reaction.

Through the Center for Enabling New Technology through Catalysis (CENTC), Goldberg also contributed to finding methods of activating strong bonds such as C-H, C-C, C-O, C-N, and N-H. Through this, the Goldberg research group discovered how to functionalize these bonds once they are activated through oxidative addition and reductive elimination. This investigation provided detailed mechanisms, intermediates, and kinetic barriers for these catalytic processes.

=== Anti-Markovnikov Hydroamination of Alkenes ===
Recognizing the importance of linear anti-Markovnikov products, Goldberg's research focuses on discovery of transition metal catalysts which helps in catalysis of anti-Markovnikov hydroamination of alkenes. In one of her publications, she introduces a method to catalyze the hydroarylation of unactivated alkenes using Pt(II) complexes with unsymmetrical pyrrolide ligands. Selectivity was provided by using benzene and 1-hexene and an optimized catalyst. The result was production of high olefin concentration using propylene as the substrate.

Most of her research on the subject has involved experimental studies of reductive elimination and oxidative addition reactions involving carbon-containing molecules in order to gain information on the reaction coordinates of such processes. Her further studies on using platinum-based catalysts for the reductive eliminations of alkane products have also included crystallography characterizations of platinum complexes and selected intermediates to determine the mechanism of such reactions.

=== Molecular Oxygen Catalysis ===
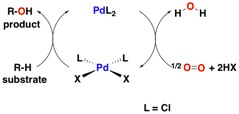
An example of a palladium catalytic cycle that uses oxygen as a final oxidant.

Goldberg's research interests also include harnessing molecular oxygen as a selective oxidant in catalysis. As molecular oxygen is readily available and environmentally benign, the Goldberg group, along with other research groups involved in the CENTC, have attempted to better comprehend oxygen's reactivity and to activate it to utilize it to its fullest capacity. Current research has aimed to understand how reactions between transition metal complexes and oxygen occur. Goldberg has recently investigated the insertion of molecular oxygen into palladium-hydride bonds, with results suggesting that this insertion reaction does not involve radical chain mechanisms. This research of the capabilities of oxygen to insert into palladium-hydride bonds have been expanded by the study of the general reactivity of molecular oxygen with middle- to late-transition metals, such as platinum. This contribution to the understanding of molecular oxygen's method of reaction with palladium and other transition metals may lead to further development and perfecting of molecular oxygen as a selective oxidizer.

=== Gem-Dialkyl Ligands ===
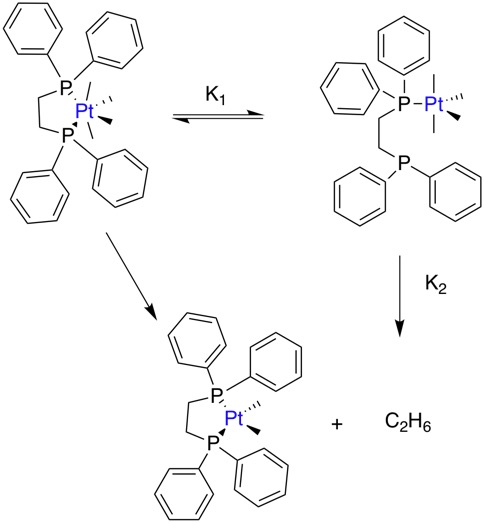
A platinum tetramethyl complex undergoes elimination of a molecule of ethane by way of its chelating bidentate ligand.

Further research by Goldberg on the study of transition metal-catalyzed reactions places additional emphasis on the metal-complex ligands. Recent publications have reported that gem-dialkyl substituents on platinum-based metal complexes can be utilized to determine the mechanism of reaction pathway and whether the mechanism includes chelate opening. The gem-dialkyl substituents have been used in the past for recognizing thermodynamic properties of chemical systems, though recent studies have pushed those discoveries to the understanding of kinetic systems as well. Goldberg's research on the effects of these types of substituents on bidentate ligands and how these effects change the mechanisms and rates of reductive elimination reactions has helped advance improvements of transition metal-based inorganic and organic catalysis.

== Awards and honors ==
Her accolades include:

- 1995–96 Union Carbide Innovation Recognition Program Award
- 2006 AWIS NY Metro Outstanding Woman Scientist
- 2007–present Director of the Center for Enabling New Technologies Through Catalysis (CENTC), a Phase II NSF Chemical Bonding Center
- 2011 Elected to the American Association for the Advancement of Science
- 2015 Carol Tyler Award, International Precious Metals Institute
- 2016 ACS Award in Organometallic Chemistry
- 2017 Elected to the American Academy of Arts and Sciences
- 2018 Elected to the National Academy of Sciences
