= Sibrina Collins =

African American inorganic chemist

Sibrina Collins is an American inorganic chemist, educator, and researcher. She has held many career positions including being an editor, educator, and director of a museum. She regularly advocates for inclusion and diversity in the STEM fields, especially for women and people of color. She is known for using pop culture references to engage students in STEM.

== Early life and education ==
Sibrina Collins was born in Detroit, Michigan. She took a chemistry class at Highland Park Community College while completing her associate degree, and was fascinated by the topic of stoichiometry, which led her to pursue being a chemist. Collins earned her Bachelor of Arts in chemistry from Wayne State University in 1994 and a Ph.D. in Inorganic Chemistry from Ohio State University in 2000. Her graduate research was supervised by Bruce Bursten and focused on photochemistry and organometallic chemistry. After earning her Ph.D., Collins started work as a postdoctoral fellow in analytical chemistry with Isiah Warner at Louisiana State University. During that time, Collins considered multiple different career paths in chemistry. Although as an early student, she dreamed of teaching at an HBCU, over the years she had developed a passion for increasing diversity and inclusion in STEM and began devoting her efforts to that goal.

== Career ==
Once she completed her post-doc program, Collins started working at American Association for the Advancement of Science (AAAS) working in the Minority Scientists Network (MiSciNet). In her time as an editor, she put out many articles starting her focus on minority perspectives in the sciences. Two year later, Collins began a faculty position at Claflin University, an HBCU. Following her position at Claflin, Collins started working at The University of Washington as a Director of Graduate Diversity Recruiting, supporting DEI in STEM from 2006 to 2008. She returned to the classroom in 2008 as a faculty member in the department of chemistry at The College of Wooster where she remained until 2014. During her time at Claflin and the College of Wooster, Collins mentored 17 undergraduates and also performed research on the use of transition metals in cancer treatment.

== Leadership ==
Collins has held several leadership position, including director of the Charles H. Wright Museum of African American History in Detroit and the director of STEM Ed Institute at Eastern Michigan University. She was also the executive director at The Marburger STEM Center (MSC), located on the campus of Lawrence Technological University campus in Southfield, MI from 2016 to 2021. She was a leader at Lawrence Tech's College of Arts and Sciences in the Michigan College and University Partnership (MICUP) Program. This program helps community college students and faculty have opportunities at LTU. She also worked with the Women of Ford to provide funding for automotive engineering clubs at two high schools.

== Advocacy ==
As Collins was growing up she felt a lack of encouragement to have women in science fields, and even less for people of color. In 1994 she was one of eight African Americans in the Ohio State graduate program. All eight students were invited to a meeting with the chemistry department chair to talk about inclusion and what could be done to have more people of color in the chemistry department. It was then that Collins realized her passion for advocating for diversity and inclusion in STEM. Throughout her education, Collins noticed the lack of people who looked like her in her textbooks, but after getting her PhD she was determined to change that. Later on her passion for diversity led her to become the director for graduate diversity recruiting in science at the University of Washington. After two years she had missed teaching and went on to teach at the College of Wooster. During her time there as she taught various chemistry topics she would do her best to incorporate stories of chemists who looked more like her and whose stories were left out of textbooks. She has written for a variety of platforms, including her “Unsung” articles at Undark, focussing on little-known black scientists. Collins has also been awarded the John G. Petty Community Champion Award from LTU.

In 2018, with the release of the movie Black Panther, Collins asked the question “Where does vibranium fall in the periodic table?”, which was the first of many questions Collins posed to try to get students more interested in science. Collins's pedagogy uses storytelling to engage students, particularly minority students, into STEM.

== Publications ==
- Collins, Sibrina N. (January 2021). "The importance of storytelling in chemical education". Nature Chemistry. 13 (1): 1–2. Bibcode:2021NatCh..13....1C. doi:10.1038/s41557-020-00617-7. PMID 33353969.
- Collins, Sibrina N. (2017). "Critical Mass Takes Courage: Diversity in the Chemical Sciences". Diversity in the Scientific Community Volume 2: Perspectives and Exemplary Programs. ACS Symposium Series. Vol. 1256. pp. 165–177. doi:10.1021/bk-2017-1256.ch015. ISBN 978-0-8412-3236-5.
- Sun, Yujie; Collins, Sibrina N.; Joyce, Lauren E.; Turro, Claudia (3 May 2010). "Unusual Photophysical Properties of a Ruthenium(II) Complex Related to [Ru(bpy) 2 (dppz)] 2+". Inorganic Chemistry. 49 (9): 4257–4262. doi:10.1021/ic9025365. PMID 20353166.
- Quraishi, Iram; Collins, Sibrina; Pestaner, Joseph P.; Harris, Twaina; Bagasra, Omar (January 2005). "Role of zinc and zinc transporters in the molecular pathogenesis of diabetes mellitus". Medical Hypotheses. 65 (5): 887–892. doi:10.1016/j.mehy.2005.02.047. PMID 16043303.
- Collins, Sibrina N.; Brett, Constance M.; Bursten, Bruce E. (December 2004). "Density Functional Theory and Low-Temperature Matrix Investigations of CO-Loss Photochemistry from [(C5R5)Ru(CO)2]2 (R = H, Me) Complexes". Journal of Cluster Science. 15 (4): 469–487. doi:10.1007/s10876-004-5770-8.
- Mwongela, Simon; Akbay, Cevdet; Zhu, Xiaofeng; Collins, Sibrina; Warner, Isiah M. (September 2003). "Use of poly(sodium oleyl- L -leucylvalinate) surfactant for the separation of chiral compounds in micellar electrokinetic chromatography". Electrophoresis. 24 (17): 2940–2947. doi:10.1002/elps.200305521. PMID 12973797.
- Fronczek, Frank R.; Collins, Sibrina N.; Chan, Julia Y. (15 April 2001). "Refinement of ferrous sulfate heptahydrate (melanterite) with low-temperature CCD data". Acta Crystallographica Section E: Structure Reports Online. 57 (4): i26–i27. Bibcode:2001AcCrE..57I..26F. doi:10.1107/S1600536801004202.
