= Charles C. Price =

American chemist (1913–2001)

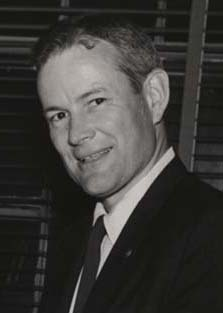
- Price in 1958
- Born: Charles Coale Price III; July 13, 1913; Passaic, New Jersey, U.S.
- Died: February 11, 2001 (aged 87); Haverford, Pennsylvania
- Education: Swarthmore College, Harvard University
- Scientific career
- Fields: Physical organic chemistry
- Workplaces: University of Illinois at Chicago, University of Notre Dame, University of Pennsylvania
- Doctoral advisor: Louis Fieser

Charles C. Price (July 13, 1913 - February 11, 2001) was an American chemist and president of the American Chemical Society (1965). He taught at the University of Illinois at Chicago, the University of Notre Dame, and the University of Pennsylvania.

He was known as a pioneer of polymer science. He co-organized the first Reaction Mechanisms Conference in 1946. He was also a founding co-editor of the Journal of Polymer Science in 1946. He studied polymerization processes as part of the U.S. synthetic rubber program during World War II and invented and patented polyether polyurethane foam rubber. He also contributed to the detection of chemical weapons, the develop of chloroquine as a treatment for malaria, and treatments for cancer.

In 1952 Price won the Democratic nomination to Congress for Indiana's 3rd congressional district. He was an active Quaker. As a long-term member of the United World Federalists, he campaigned for disarmament and co-operative world government through a strengthened United Nations. One of his interests was yacht racing, for which he won numerous awards.

== Education ==
Charles Coale Price III was born on July 13, 1913, to Thornton Walton Price, a mechanical engineer, and Helen Marot Farley, in Passaic, New Jersey. His parents were Quakers who had married in the Swarthmore Friends Meeting. Charles was the first of five children. At age six, his right hand was blown off in an accident with a box of detonators for dynamite.

Price attended Swarthmore College, earning a Bachelor's degree in chemistry with high honors, Phi Beta Kappa in 1934. He excelled in sports and was captain of the varsity lacrosse team.

Price received his Masters (1935) and Ph.D. (1936) from Harvard University, where he worked with Louis Fieser. In June 1936, he married Mary Elma White.

== Career ==
=== University of Illinois at Chicago ===
Price did one year of post-doctoral work at the University of Illinois at Chicago, working with Roger Adams on the structure of gossypol. His interest in molecular bonding and the mechanisms of chemical reactions underlies much of his career. He was a member of the faculty from 1936 to 1946, becoming an assistant professor in 1936, an instructor in 1937, and an associate professor in 1942, in the department of chemistry.

During World War II, Price did research in several important areas. He developed tests to detect known chemical warfare agents in water and constructed equipment to remove them. He worked on the synthesis of 4,7-dichloroquinoline and tested chloroquine as a possible substitute for quinine, which was no longer available for the treatment of malaria. He studied polymers and polymerization processes involved in the production of synthetic rubber as part of the U.S. synthetic rubber program, which sought alternative sources to unavailable natural rubber.

=== University of Notre Dame ===
From 1946 to 1954, Price was Professor and Chairman of the Department of Chemistry at the University of Notre Dame. At Notre Dame, Price and Paul Doughty Bartlett organized the first Conference on Organic Reaction Mechanisms, held September 3, 1946. This conference marks the point at which American physical organic chemists in the United States began to identify themselves as members of a field. Price was a founding co-editor of the Journal of Polymer Science in 1946, with Paul M. Doty and Herman Francis Mark. He also served on the editorial board of Organic Syntheses from 1946 to 1954. He received the 1946 ACS Award in Pure Chemistry, given to the most promising young chemist, and presented "Some Polar Factors Affecting the Properties of Unsaturated Compounds" as his award address.

Price was a pioneer in the field of polyethers. He invented polyether polyurethane rubber, a form of foam rubber which became widely used in sponges, mattresses, cars, insulation and building materials, flotation devices, and packaging. He obtained U.S. Patent 2,866,774 for elastomeric polyether urethanes (Filing Date: 09/23/1953; Publication Date: 12/30/1958).

In 1950, Price campaigned at the Indiana Democratic Convention for the Democratic nomination to the U.S. Senate, in a three-way contest with Andrew Jacobs Sr. and winner Alexander M. Campbell. In 1952 Price won the Democratic nomination to Congress for Indiana's 3rd congressional district. He came second in the election to the Republican candidate Shepard J. Crumpacker Jr.

"Although I do not underestimate the contributions that science can continue to make to our civilization, I am convinced that scientific progress is far ahead of political progress. To solve our present crisis, precipitated by technical developments which have made all nations neighbors in the world community, we must achieve political progress by building an effective political organization at the world level." Charles C. Price, 1952

Price resigned as head of the chemistry department at Notre Dame in 1952, to campaign, and was reappointed as department head in 1954.

=== University of Pennsylvania ===
In 1954, Price joined the University of Pennsylvania, where he became the Blanchard Professor of Chemistry and chairman of the chemistry department. In 1966 he stepped down as chairman and was named the University Professor of Chemistry. In 1968 he was named the Benjamin Franklin Professor of Chemistry. He continued to work in the area of polymers, and built upon his previous work with chemical warfare and disease treatment, investigating the area of cancer treatment.

Price served on the Divisional Committee for Mathematical, Physical, and Engineering Sciences of the National Science Foundation in the 1950s. In 1962, he spent several months in Japan with his family, teaching at Osaka University and Kyoto University as a Fulbright Professor.

Price served as president of the American Chemical Society in 1965. He chaired a new committee, on Chemistry and Public Affairs, and worked with Arnold Thackray, head of the University of Pennsylvania department of History and Sociology of Science, to establish a Center for the History of Chemistry (CHOC).

Price retired from the University of Pennsylvania as professor emeritus in 1978. When CHOC was founded in 1982, Price became the founding chair of the CHOC Policy Council. Price was instrumental in helping CHOC to obtain funding from John C. Haas, Arnold Beckman, and others. In 1992, CHOC was renamed the Chemical Heritage Foundation and in 2018, the Science History Institute. The Charles C. Price Fellowship for postdoctoral students studying the history of science and technology was first awarded by the institution in 1999.

Mary Elma (White) Price died of cancer in 1982, survived by her husband and their five children: Patricia (1938-), Susanne (1940-), Sarah (1944-), Judith (1946-) and Charles Coale IV (1948-). Charles Price remarried in 1983, to Anne Parker Gill. He died on February 11, 2001.

== Activism ==
Price was active in the United World Federalists for many years. The organization advocated strengthening the United Nations to form a world government that could resolve issues and ensure peace. While in Indiana, Price served as Chairman of the St. Joseph County Chapter (1948-1950) and the Indiana State Branch (1950-1952). After moving to Philadelphia, he served as vice-president of the Philadelphia Area Council and the Pennsylvania State Branch (1955). Price also served on the National Executive Council from 1950 to 1953 and 1956 to 1965. He served as Chairman of the Statutes Committee of the World Movement for World Federal Government from 1953 to 1957. He became First Vice-president of the United World Federalists from 1958 to 1959, and President from 1959 to 1961. He was one of the signatories of the agreement to convene a convention for drafting a world constitution. As a result, for the first time in human history, a World Constituent Assembly convened to draft and adopt the Constitution for the Federation of Earth.

Price was Chairman of the Federation of American Scientists from 1956 to 1957. He was on the executive committee of the Commission to Study the Organization of Peace in 1962. He served on the U.S. National Commission for UNESCO from 1964 to 1969, and served on its executive committee from 1966 to 1969. He became board chairman of the Council for a Livable World in 1973. He served on the board of the Committee on a Sane Nuclear Policy (SANE), and spoke before U.S. Government committees on the Prohibition of Chemical and Biological Weapons.

Price was active as a Quaker, serving as clerk of the Philadelphia Yearly Meeting working group on world federal government and as clerk of the Old Haverford Meeting. He served on the College Board of Managers for Swarthmore College, the American Friends Service Committee, and as co-chairman of the Global Interdependence Center in Philadelphia in the 1980s.

He encouraged scientists and government institutions to work together in support of disarmament and to seek peaceful solutions to economic, political, and social challenges throughout the world.

== Sailing ==
Price was a long-term member of the Cruising Club of America, winning a number of trophies in his racing yachts Proton (a Gulfstar 41) and Proton II. When he moved from South Bend, Indiana to Philadelphia, Pennsylvania in 1954, he sailed his yacht from Lake Michigan to the Chesapeake Bay, a three-month trip. First he participated in a 330-mile race from Chicago to Mackinac Island. Then he went through the Great Lakes to the canal at Buffalo, New York. After reaching the coast, he sailed along the coastline to Annapolis, Maryland.

Between 1960 and 1970, Price competed six times in the Bermuda Race from Newport to Bermuda. In 1970, he sailed from Bermuda to the Isle of Wight, England in his 45-foot sailboat, to compete in the Cowes Week regatta. Other competitors in the races at Cowes Week included Prince Philip, Duke of Edinburgh and Prime Minister Edward Heath.

== Works ==
- Mechanisms of reactions at carbon-carbon double bonds. New York : Interscience, 1946 [i.e. 1947].
- Sulfur bonding. (with Shigeru Ōae) New York, Ronald Press Co., 1962.
- Geometry of molecules. New York : McGraw-Hill, 1971.
- Synthesis of life. Stroudsburg, Pa., Dowden, Hutchinson & Ross, 1974.
- Energy and order, some reflections on evolution. Swarthmore, Pa. : C. Price, c1983.
- Coordination polymerization. (Polymer science and technology, v. 19.) New York : Plenum Press, c1983.

== Awards and honors ==
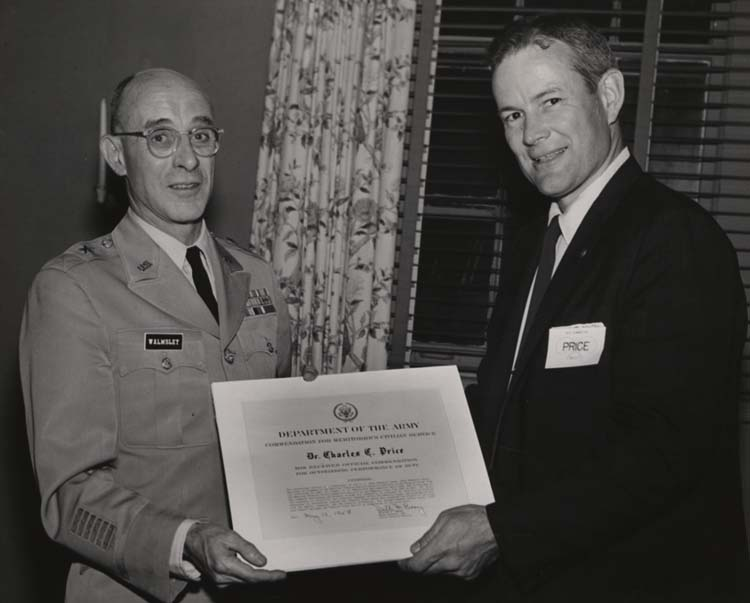
Charles C. Price receives Army Commendation for Meritorious Civilian Service, May 20, 1958

- 2016, "Charles C Price, 1965 ACS President: Exploring his legacy after 50 years", Special symposium of the American Chemical Society Division of the History of Chemistry, 252nd ACS National Meeting
- 1974, Polyether Symposium in honor of Charles C. Price on the occasion of his receiving the Creative Invention Award of the American Chemical Society for his pioneering U.S. Patent 2,866,774 on elastomeric polyether urethanes
- 1973, Charles Lathrop Parsons Award for outstanding public service, American Chemical Society
- 1966, Chemical Pioneer Award, American Institute of Chemists
- 1958, Department of the Army Commendation for Meritorious Civilian Service, the second highest award granted by the Army to civilian personnel
- 1950, Honorary Degree, Swarthmore College
- 1946, Award in Pure Chemistry, American Chemical Society, "to the most promising American chemist under 36 years of age"
