= Foam rubber =

Rubber manufactured with a foaming agent

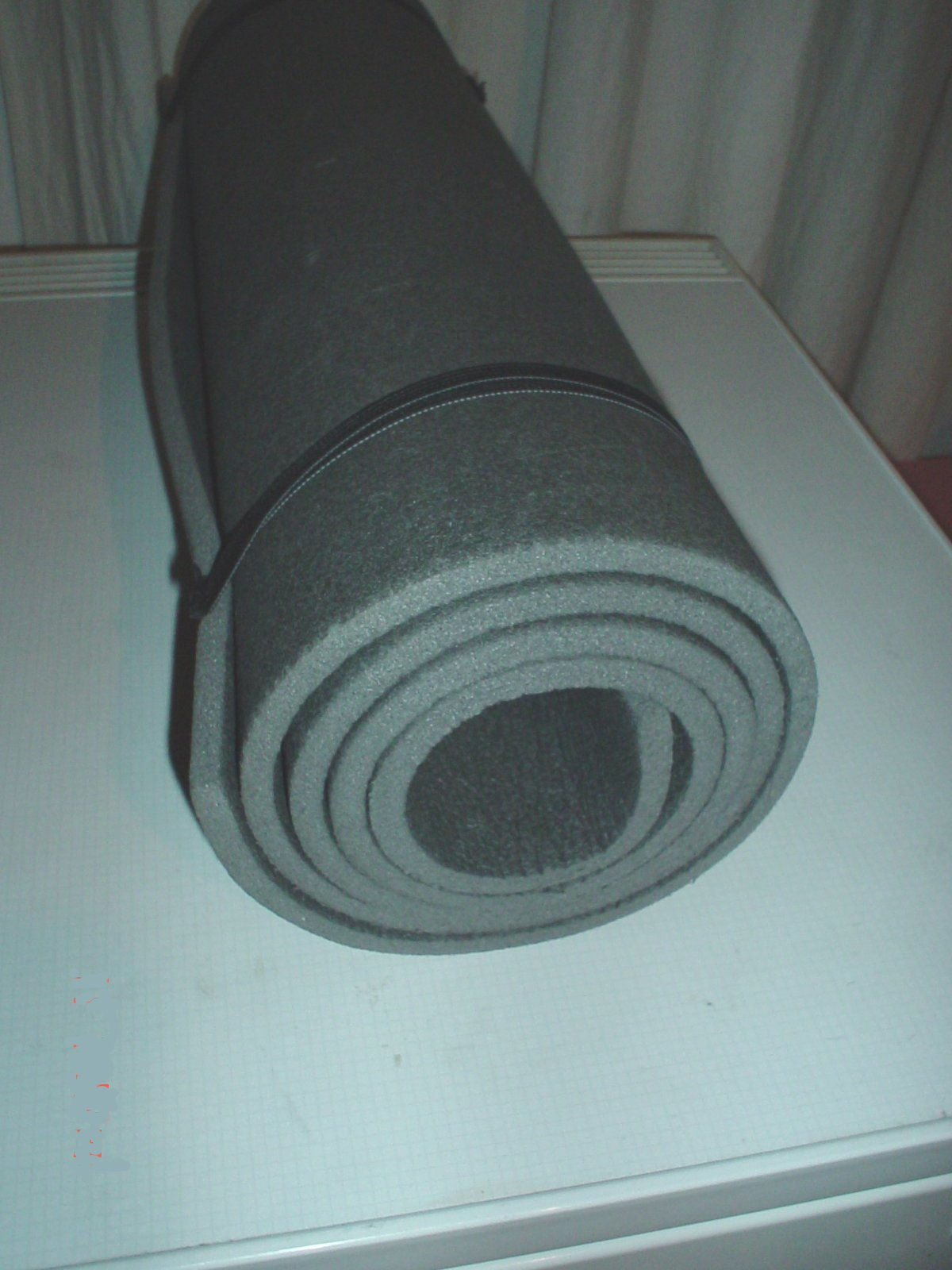
Foam rubber yoga mat

Foam rubber (also known as cellular rubber, sponge rubber, or expanded rubber) is a rubber that has been made with a foaming agent so that its structure is an air-filled matrix. Commercial foam rubber is generally made of synthetic rubber, natural latex, or polyurethane. Latex foam rubber, used in mattresses, is well known for its endurance. Polyurethane is a thermosetting polymer that comes from the combination of methyl di-isocyanate and polyethylene and some chemical additives.

== Manufacturing history ==
Foam rubber was first made in 1929 by E. A. Murphy and Eric Owen, two research chemists at Dunlop Rubber, who used whipped latex. In 1937, isocyanate-based materials were first used to make foam rubber. After World War II, styrene-butadiene rubber replaced many natural types of foam. Foam rubber has been used commercially for a wide range of applications since the 1940s.

Polyether polyurethane rubber was discovered and patented in the 1950s by Charles C. Price. Polyurethane foams now make up over 90%, by weight, of the entire market for polyurethanes. The largest amount of polyurethane is used by these in construction, transportation, home furniture, noise and vibration reduction, and carpet. Construction uses 27% of polyurethane, and transportation uses 21%. Flexible foam is the leading use, at 44% of total volume; rigid foam makes up 28% of the United States market.

== Manufacturing process ==
Rates of polymerization can range from a few seconds to many minutes. Fast-reacting polymers have short cycle-periods and require machines to mix the reacting agents. Slow polymers may be mixed by hand; because hand-mixing takes a long time, industrial applications tend to use powered mixers. Ways of processing the product include spraying, open pouring, and molding, among others.

- Material preparation—Liquid and solid material generally arrive on location via rail or truck; once unloaded, liquid materials are stored in heated tanks. When producing slabstock, typically two or more polymer streams are used.
- Mixing—Open pouring, better known as continuous dispensing, is used primarily in the formation of rigid, low density foams. Specific amounts of chemicals are mixed into a mixing head, much like an industrial blender. The foam is poured onto a conveyor belt, where it then cures for cutting.
- Curing and cutting—After curing on the conveyor belt, the foam is then forced through a horizontal band saw. This band saw cuts the pieces cut in a set size for the application. General contracting uses 4 feet × 12 feet × 2 inches.
- Further processing: Once cut and cured, the slabstock can either be sold, or a lamination process can be applied. This process turns the slabstock into a rigid foam board known as boardstock. Boardstock is used for metal roof insulation, oven insulation, and many other durable goods.
- Polymer Blending: Advanced mixing technology, such as high-shear mixers and twin-screw extruders, is used for blending polymers to achieve a uniform molecular structure. This helps in optimizing the quality and consistency of the final product, reducing waste, and increasing production efficiency.
- Post-Curing Heat Treatment: Some foam products undergo a secondary heat treatment process, known as post-curing, to enhance their durability and dimensional stability. This ensures that the foam retains its structural integrity under varying temperature conditions, which is particularly useful in automotive and aerospace applications.
- Surface Coating: To improve the performance of foam materials, a variety of surface coatings, such as flame retardants or UV-resistant layers are applied. This is especially crucial for outdoor applications where the foam material might be exposed to sunlight or harsh environmental conditions.
- Recycling and Sustainability: Many manufacturers are adopting closed-loop systems for recycling scrap foam back into the production process. This minimizes waste and makes the manufacturing process more environmentally friendly by reducing the need for raw materials and energy.
- Quality Control and Testing: The manufacturing process also includes multiple quality control checks, such as visual inspection, density testing, and stress-strain tests. These checks ensure that the final foam product meets the required standards for performance, safety, and durability.

== Physical properties ==
The main physical properties of foam rubber are lightweight, buoyancy, cushioning, thermal and acoustic insulation, impact damping, and cost reduction. Crosslinking technology is used in the formation of EVA-based foams, including LLDPE, LDPE, HDPE, PP, and TPE. Crosslinking is the most important characteristic in the production of foam rubber to obtain the best possible foam expansion and physical properties. Crosslinking is chemical bonding between polymer chains and is used in foam-rubber manufacturing to stabilize bubble expansion, enhance resistance to thermal collapse, and improve physical properties.

== Recycling ==
Because of the variety in polyurethane chemistries, it is hard to recycle foam rubber using a single method. Reusing slab stock foam for carpet backing is how most recycling is done. This method involves shredding the scrap and bonding the small flakes together to form sheets. Other methods involve breaking the foam down into granules and dispersing them into a polyol blend to be molded into the same part as the original. The recycling process is still developing for foam rubber, and the future may unveil new, easier recycling.

Foam rubber continues to be an essential material across industries due to its durability, versatility, and wide range of applications. From insulation and cushioning to vibration control, it remains a critical component in modern manufacturing.

== See also ==
- Polymeric foam
- Talalay process, a method of producing molded natural foam rubber of uniform density
