= Charles Lathrop Parsons =

American chemist

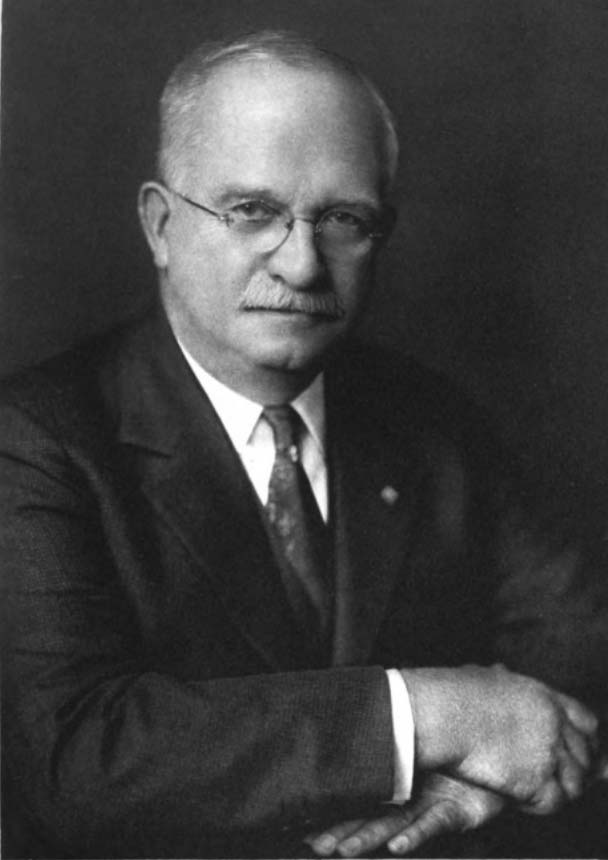
- Born: March 23, 1867; New Marlboro, Massachusetts
- Died: February 13, 1954 (aged 86); Pocasset, Massachusetts
- Citizenship: American
- Education: Cornell University
- Known for: Beryllium, American Chemical Society
- Scientific career
- Workplaces: University of New Hampshire, U.S. Bureau of Mines, American Chemical Society

Charles Lathrop Parsons (March 23, 1867, New Marlboro, Massachusetts-February 13, 1954 Pocasset, Massachusetts) was an American chemist. He was a professor at the University of New Hampshire for twenty years, and then a chemist and mineralogist at the U.S. Bureau of Mines. For nearly forty years, Parsons served as executive secretary of the American Chemical Society, becoming known as "Mr. ACS" and substantially influencing the formation of the association.

== Education ==
Charles Lathrop Parsons was born on March 23, 1867, in New Marlboro, Massachusetts, to Benjamin Franklin and Leonora Frances (Bartlett) Parsons. When he was ten, they moved to Hawkinsville, Georgia. Parsons attended Cushing Academy, graduating in 1885.

Parsons then studied at Cornell University, receiving his bachelor's degree from Cornell University in 1888. On December 29, 1887, he married Alice Douglas Robertson, also an undergraduate at Cornell. They had four daughters and a son: Anna, Leonora Elizabeth, Alice Enith, Priscilla and Charles Lathrop Jr.

== Career ==
=== University of New Hampshire ===
After graduation, Parsons worked briefly as assistant chemist at the New Hampshire Agricultural Experiment Station in Hanover, New Hampshire. In 1889 he became an instructor of chemistry at the New Hampshire Land Grant College (now the University of New Hampshire). He was promoted to the new position of associate professor of chemistry in 1890. He became professor of general and analytical chemistry in 1891 and professor of inorganic chemistry in 1903. He supervised the transition of the chemistry department during New Hampshire College's move from Hanover to Durham, New Hampshire, in 1893. From 1909 to 1911 he served as head of the department of chemistry.

Parsons' research dealt with analysis of minerals, ores and radioactive materials. He was the co-author of Mineralogy, Crystallography and Blowpipe Analysis (1900) with A. J. Moses, which went into multiple editions. He was the author of The Chemistry and Literature of Beryllium (1909), of Fuller's Earth (1913), and other titles. He was recognized for his work on beryllium, for which he won the William H. Nichols Medal in 1905. In addition to his research, Parsons took an active interest in the history of the American Revolution and published a book in 1903 about the Capture of Fort William and Mary.

=== U.S. Bureau of Mines ===
On September 1, 1912, Parsons became the chief mineral chemist at the U.S. Bureau of Mines in Washington, D.C. In 1913, Parsons helped to organize the National Radium Institute to study the extraction of radium from carnotite ores and create a domestic process for its extraction, rather than exporting the raw material and importing radium. He was deeply interested in the use of radium to treat cancerous tumors.

In 1916, during World War I, Parsons was transferred to the War Department, with the position of chief engineer. He was sent to Europe to study the fixation of nitrogen and oxidation of ammonia, which were important for the production of fertilizer and explosives. At his recommendation, four factories were built, entering production after the end of the war.

Parsons was also responsible for arranging for a census of American chemists. When the United States entered the war in April 1917, selected chemists were released from military service to carry out research on projects considered important to the war effort. Parsons helped to organize the Chemical Warfare Service of the US Army. In 1919, after the end of the war, Parsons left the Bureau of Mines.

=== American Chemical Society ===
Parsons became a member of the American Chemical Society (ACS) when he attended the World Congress of Chemists at the Columbian Exposition of 1893 in Chicago. From 1907 until 1919, Parsons was part-time secretary of the American Chemical Society, succeeding William A. Noyes. From 1919 to 1946, Parsons was full-time executive secretary of the ACS, its chief administrative officer, in charge of its day-to-day operations. He retired on December 31, 1945, after the end of World War II.

Parsons was closely involved, along with Marston T. Bogert, in establishing a new structure for the ACS. He helped to transform it from a New York State Corporation into a national organization based in Washington, D.C. He was also involved with the creation of a number of divisions, organized around specialized groups, beginning with Industrial Chemists and Chemical Engineers. He is credited with substantially expanding the association's membership and its publications. Under his leadership, its roster expanded from 3000 members in 1908 to 40,000 in 1945. The number of journals published by the society increased from two to eight. The annual budget of the organization expanded from several thousand dollars to 1.5 million dollars.

In addition, Parsons served as secretary of Section C of the American Association for the Advancement of Science (AAAS) from 1904 to 1908. He served as vice president for America of the International Union of Pure and Applied Chemistry (IUPAC), from 1919 to 1922.

== Awards and honors ==
In 1911, Parsons received an honorary Doctor of Science degree from the University of Maine. In 1915 he received an honorary doctorate from the University of Pittsburgh. In 1944, he received an honorary Doctor of Science degree from the University of New Hampshire.

Parsons received a number of international honors as a result of his work. In 1922, he was named an officer of the French Legion of Honour. In 1926, he was named cavalier of the Order of the Crown of Italy. In 1926, he was named an honorary member of the Romanian Chemical Society and a life member of the Société chimique de France. In 1931 he became an honorary member of the Society of Chemical Industry of Great Britain.

He also received American awards at a national level. In 1932 he received the Priestley Medal for distinguished service, the highest honor conferred by the American Chemical Society. In 1948, he became an honorary member of the American Institute of Chemists, and an honorary member of the Chemists' Club in New York.

The Charles Lathrop Parsons Award of the American Chemical Society is named in his honor and was first presented, to him, in 1952. It is awarded to members of the ACS for public service in the field of chemistry.
