= Anne E. Giblin =

Marine biologist and researcher

- Education: B.S.: Biology, Rensselaer Polytechnic Institute, Troy, NY, 1975 Ph.D.: Ecology, Boston University Marine Program, Woods Hole, MA, 1982
- Awards: Phi Lambda Upsilon Chemical Honor Society, Aldo Leopold Leadership Fellowship 2001, American Association for the Advancement of Science Fellow 2013
- Scientific career
- Fields: ecosystem ecology, biogeochemistry, nutrient cycling
- Workplaces: Ecosystem Center, Marine Biological Laboratory
- Website: https://www.mbl.edu/ecosystems/faculty/giblin/

Anne E. Giblin is a marine biologist who researches the cycling of elements nitrogen, sulfur, iron and phosphorus. She is a Senior Scientist and Acting Director of the Ecosystem Center at the Marine Biological Lab.

== Education ==
Giblin earned her Bachelor of Science in Biology at Rensselaer Polytechnic Institute, in Troy, NY in 1975. She went on to earn her Ph.D. in ecology at the Boston University Marine Program, in Woods Hole, MA, in 1982. Giblin did her graduate work in the Massachusetts Great Sippewissett Marsh, studying trace metal solubility in salt marsh sediments which were contaminated with sewage sludge.

== Career and research ==
Gilbin's research primarily focuses on the cycling of elements such as nitrogen, sulfur, iron, and phosphorus in the environment. The majority of Giblin's research is focused around the circulation of these elements in different redox (reduction-oxidation) conditions in soils and sediments. Another dominant theme in her work is to comprehend if sediment processes act as a buffer or act to exacerbate anthropogenic inputs of nutrients to the environment. For example, much of her work focuses on the nitrogen cycle, and the effects ecosystems may have if there are high nutrient inputs from wastewater or fertilizer.

Gilbin is the lead PI of the Plum Island Ecosystems Long Term Ecological Research Site (PIE LTER). The Plum Island Ecosystems is composed of estuaries and watersheds located in northeastern Massachusetts. The three rivers that make up the ecosystem are the Ipswich River, Parker River, and the Rowley River. The goal of this research site is to develop an understanding of the long-term effect's sea-level rise linked to climate change may have on the watershed. The knowledge gathered through this research site is used in policy and land management with the initiative to protect the natural resources of the coastal zone.

Giblin is also works at the Arctic Long-Term Ecological Research (ARC LTER). The project is located on the north slope of Alaska. Similar to PIE LTER, this project was created to study anthropogenic as well as natural environmental change on ecosystems. Giblin conducted a long-term fertilization experiment in a pair of lakes and observed their recovery, to anticipate the effects of what will happen with a longer growing season. Data from this project could inform the management of the landscape.

Giblin has also worked have had to do with acid deposition on the sulfur cycle of lakes, the movement of trace metals in salt marsh sediments, nitrogen inputs and hydrologic disturbances to estuaries and Arctic lakes.

== Awards and honors ==
- Phi Lambda Upsilon Chemical Honor Society.
- 2001 - Aldo Leopold Leadership Fellowship
- 2013 - Fellow of the American Association for the Advancement of Science

Grants: Giblin's research is supported by numerous grants from the National Science Foundation and the USGS

== Publications ==
Giblin's publications include the following:

1. Responses of Arctic Tundra to Experimental and Observed Changes in Climate, 1995, Ecological Society of America.
2. Resource-based niches provide a basis for plant species diversity and dominance in arctic tundra, 2002, Nature international journal of science.
3. Methods for Measuring Denitrification: Diverse approaches to a difficult problem, 2006, Ecological society of America
4. Global Change and the Carbon Balance of Arctic Ecosystems: Carbon/nutrient interactions should act as major constraints on changes in global terrestrial carbon cycling, June 1992, BioScience, Volume 42, Issue 6
5. ^{15}N natural abundances and N use by tundra plants, 1996, Oecologia
