= NAS Award for Chemistry in Service to Society =

The NAS Award for Chemistry in Service to Society is awarded by the U.S. National Academy of Sciences "for contributions to chemistry, either in fundamental science or its application, that clearly satisfy a societal need." It has been awarded every two years since its inception in 1991.

== List of NAS Award for Chemistry in Service to Society winners ==
Source: NAS

- Michael E. Jung (2025)

For his key contributions to synthetic medicinal chemistry and drug discovery.

- Hye Kyung Timken (2023)

For her development of an innovative catalyst technology that can makes oil refineries safer, and reduces environmental impacts of fuel production.

- Susan Solomon (2021)

Solomon is renowned for her insightful and persuasive use of atmospheric chemistry to comprehend two of the most important environmental problems facing humanity today: the thinning ozone layer and climate change. She is also well-known for her skillful presentation of environmental science to decision-makers, which helps to move legislation along.

- John C. Martin (2019)

For his contributions to the development of antiviral medications used to treat even the most refractory of the deadly diseases, including HIV/AIDS, HCV, HBV, CMV, and flu, impacting hundreds of millions of individuals around the world and for his tireless efforts to ensure all of humanity, rich and poor alike, benefit.

- Leroy E. Hood (2017)

For his invention, commercialization and development of multiple chemical tools that address biological complexity, including the automated DNA sequencer that spearheaded the human genome project.

- Bruce D. Roth (2015)

For his discovery, synthesis and commercial development of atorvastatin (Lipitor), the most successful cholesterol lowering medicine in history.

- Edward C. Taylor (2013)

For his contributions to heterocyclic chemistry, in particular the discovery of the new-generation antifolate pemetrexed, approved for the treatment of mesothelioma and non-small cell lung cancer and under clinical investigation for treatment of a variety of other solid tumors.

- Paul J. Reider (2011)

For his contributions to the discovery and development of numerous approved drugs, including those for treating asthma and for treating AIDS.

- John D. Roberts (2009)

For seminal contributions in physical organic chemistry, in particular the introduction of NMR spectroscopy to the chemistry community.

- Arthur A. Patchett (2007)

For innovative contributions in discoveries of Mevacor, the first statin that lowers cholesterol levels, and of Vasotec and Prinivil for treating hypertension and congestive heart failure.

- Marvin H. Caruthers (2005)

For his invention and development of chemical reagents and methods currently used for the automated synthesis of DNA oligonucleotides (i.e., the "gene machine").

- Paul S. Anderson (2003)

For his scientific leadership in two drugs approved for the treatment of AIDS and for his widely cited basic research related to the glutamate receptor.

- Paul C. Lauterbur (2001)

For his research on nuclear magnetic resonance and its applications in chemistry and medicine, and his contributions to the development of magnetic resonance imaging in medicine.

- Grant Willson (1999)

For his fundamental contribution to the chemistry of materials that produce micropatterns in semiconductors, and for its widespread application in the microelectronics industry for the benefit of society.

- Ernest L. Eliel (1997)

For his seminal and far-reaching contributions in organic stereochemistry and for his wise and energetic leadership in professional societies that represent the interests of chemists and of society, both in the United States and abroad.

- P. Roy Vagelos (1995)

For his fundamental contributions to the understanding of fatty acid biosynthesis, cholesterol metabolism, and phospholipid metabolism, and for his leadership at Merck that led to the discovery of a number of important therapeutic and preventive agents.

- Harold S. Johnston (1993)

For his pioneering efforts to point out that man-made emissions could affect the chemistry of the stratosphere, in particular, the danger of the depletion by nitrogen oxide of the earth's critical and fragile ozone layer.

- Vladimir Haensel (1991)

For his outstanding research in the catalytic reforming of hydrocarbons, that has greatly enhanced the economic value of our petroleum natural resources.

== See also ==
- List of chemistry awards
