= Alfred C. Nelson =

American academic and administrator

Alfred Clarence "Pete" Nelson (November 14, 1898 – 1980) was an American chemist and academic who taught at the University of Denver and also served as an interim chancellor.

== Early life ==
Nelson was born in Salt Lake City, Utah on November 14, 1898. At the age of two, his family moved to Denver, Colorado. Nelson graduated from Denver's South High School in 1916. He received the nickname "Pete" while playing football in high school, after a University of Colorado football player named Pete Nelson.

Nelson earned both his bachelor's and master's degrees at the University of Denver. He was a member of the first pledge class of the Alpha Pi chapter of Lambda Chi Alpha. He was also a member of Phi Beta Kappa.

After two years of graduate study at the University of Illinois, he returned to the University of Denver as an associate professor of chemistry. In 1926, Nelson earned his Doctorate of Philosophy from the University of Illinois.

== Career ==
Throughout his career at the University of Denver, Nelson held many positions. He began his career as an assistant professor in 1923 and served as interim chancellor in 1948. A writer for The Denver Post dubbed him as "The Affable 'Mr. Chips' of Denver University".

Nelson was a fellow of the American Institute of Chemists and the American Association for the Advancement of Science. He was a member of the American Chemical Society; the Colorado Schoolmasters Club, Phi Delta Kappa; Kappa Delta Pi; Alpha Chi Sigma, and Phi Lambda Upsilon.

== Awards ==
Nelson received numerous awards throughout his career, including the Kappa Delta Pi fraternity Honor Award for Service in Education (1963), the University of Denver College of Engineering Distinguished Faculty Award (1963), and the Evans Award from the University of Denver Alumni Association (1971). The University of Denver gave him an honorary LLD degree in 1964.

== Personal life ==
He died in 1980 at the age of 81.
