= Hilary J. Crichton =

British chemist

Hilary J. Crichton is a British chemist currently the Editor-in-Chief of Biopolymers.
