= H. N. Cheng =

American research chemist

- Education: University of California, Los Angeles; University of Illinois Urbana-Champaign
- Scientific career
- Fields: Chemistry

H.N. Cheng is an American research chemist. His most recent position was with U.S. Department of Agriculture in its Agricultural Research Service.

== Early life ==
He received his BS in chemistry from the University of California, Los Angeles, (Phi Beta Kappa). He received a University Scholarship, the William Homan and Non-Resident Scholarship, and was a NSF Undergraduate Research Participant. He graduated summa cum laude, with Highest Honors from the chemistry department.

He received his Ph.D. from the University of Illinois at Urbana-Champaign, Illinois in the Department of Chemistry where his thesis advisor was Professor H.S. Gutowsky. He was a university fellow, a member of Sigma Xi (the Scientific Research Honor Society), Phi Kappa Phi Honor Society, and Phi Lambda Upsilon Honorary Chemical Society.

== Career ==
Cheng researches green polymer chemistry and sustainability as a platform to produce eco-friendly and sustainable products including biobased materials, biocatalysis, green processing, and green methodologies. He has developed new or improved reaction processes and made many derivatives of polysaccharides, triglycerides, proteins, and agricultural residues. New or improved products and formulations have been produced for specific applications. He has also made notable contributions on polymerization theory, modeling, and polymer NMR. He has authored or co-authored over 300 papers, 26 patent publications, organized 45 symposia, and edited 23 books.

He was a visiting member of technical staff, 1974–1976 at Bell Laboratories in Murray Hill, New Jersey, where he studied polymer oxidation and degradation.

From 1976–1979 he worked as a senior research chemist, Analytical Chemistry Department for GAF Corporation in Wayne, New Jersey. His work included analytical coordination, problem solving, and special projects.

In 1979 he moved to Hercules Incorporated in Wilmington, Delaware, where he held various R&D and managerial positions. From 1979–1983 he worked as a member of research staff, Analytical Science Division. In 1983-1990 he was a research supervisor, Analytical Science Division. From 1990–2002 he was a research fellow and program manager. From 2002–2009 he was a senior research fellow.

From 2009 until 2022 Cheng was a research chemist at USDA Southern Regional Research Center in New Orleans. He retired in May 2022 but continues as collaborator. He stays active in research and professional activities and continues to publish and give lectures on this work.

Cheng was selected an inaugural Fellow of the American Chemical Society (ACS) in 2009. He became a Fellow of the ACS Polymer Chemistry Division in 2010, and a Fellow of the ACS Agricultural and Food Chemistry Division in 2018.

He was selected as the Outstanding Scientist of the Year at USDA Southern Regional Research Center in 2014 and in 2019. He was the recipient of Spencer Award from ACS Kansan City Section and AGFD and AGRO Divisions (2022), Herty Medal from ACS Georgia Section (2022), ACS Volunteer Service Award (2016), Tillmans-Skolnick Award for Outstanding Service from the ACS Delaware Section (2006), Distinguished Service (2005) and Special Service (2015) Awards from ACS Polymer Division, and ACS Delaware Section Award for research excellence (1994).

Cheng served as the ACS president in 2021. During his presidential year, he championed the cause of chemistry, emphasizing the importance of innovation, disciplinary growth, sustainability, and digitization. Moreover, he was active in organizing webinars and symposia to benefit ACS members and the chemistry enterprise. In 2022 Cheng served as the ACS Immediate Past President and continued his efforts in promoting research, collaboration, and industrial engagements. He was Chair of International Activities Committee (2013–2015), Chair of Committee on Economic and Professional Affairs (2006), Co-chair of Presidential Task Force on "Vision 2025: Helping ACS Members Thrive in the Global Chemistry Enterprise" (2012–2013), Associate Chair of Board-Presidential Task Force on "Multidisciplinary" (2004–2005), and Chair of CEPA Task Force on "Globalization Issues" (2004–2005). He was also active in ACS local sections and technical divisions, serving in various leadership positions for many years.
