= Off-gas =

Off-gas may refer to:

- Outgassing
- air pollution
- exhaust gas
- flue gas
- the effluent gas of a chemical reactor
- "off-gas" can also refer to byproduct gases from chemical processing such as Thiol (mercaptan) oxidation
- "Refinery Off-Gas" ("ROG") is a gas mixture with varying composition (usually hydrogen-rich), a common byproduct of Catalytic reforming and Hydrodesulfurization (hydrotreating) units
