= Charles G. Overberger =

American chemist (1920-1997)

Charles Gilbert Overberger
- Born: October 12, 1920; Barnesboro, Pennsylvania, United States
- Died: March 17, 1997 (aged 76); Ann Arbor, Michigan, United States
- Education: Pennsylvania State University
- Known for: Polymer research and education
- Spouse: Elizabeth Chase Overberger
- Scientific career
- Fields: Chemist

Charles Gilbert Overberger (October 12, 1920 – March 17, 1997) was an American chemist, specialising in polymer research and education.

== Biography ==
Overberger was born in Barnesboro, Pennsylvania on October 12, 1920.

In 1941, he was awarded a B.Sc. at the Pennsylvania State University where he was a member of Sigma Pi fraternity, Phi Eta Sigma honor society, and Phi Lambda Upsilon honor society. He received his Ph.D. at the University of Illinois in 1944, where he continued to work as a research assistant for two years.

From 1946 to 1947, he had a DuPont Post-Doctoral Fellowship at the Massachusetts Institute of Technology, then became assistant professor of chemistry at the Polytechnic Institute of Brooklyn. In 1951, he became professor and associate director of the Polymer Research Institute. Between 1955 and 1963, he was chairman of the chemistry department, and from 1964 to 1967 dean of science and director of the Polymer Research Institute. He was president of the American Chemical Society in 1967. After that, he joined the University of Michigan as professor and chair of chemistry, where he also acted as vice president for research from 1972 to 1983. He founded the Macromolecular Research Center in 1968, and was director until 1987. He retired two years later.

Overberger died in Riverview, Ann Arbor, Michigan, of Parkinson's disease on March 17, 1997.

== Awards and honors ==
- Charles Lathrop Parsons Award of the American Chemical Society (1978)
- International Award of the Society of Plastics Engineers (1979)
- Howard N. Potts Medal from the Franklin Institute (1982)
- University of Michigan's Distinguished Faculty Achievement Award (1985)
