= Biopolymers (journal) =

- Discipline: Biochemistry, biophysics
- Language: English
- Edited by: Hilary J. Crichton

Publication details
- History: 1963-present
- Publisher: John Wiley & Sons
- Frequency: Biweekly
- Impact factor: 2.505 (2020)

Standard abbreviations
- ISO 4: Biopolymers

Indexing
- CODEN: BIPMAA
- ISSN: 0006-3525 (print); 1097-0282 (web)
- LCCN: sn97001409
- OCLC no.: 01536466

Links
- Journal homepage; Online access; Online archive

Biopolymers is a biweekly peer-reviewed scientific journal covering the study of biopolymers from a biochemical and biophysical perspective. It was established in 1963 and is published by John Wiley & Sons. The editor-in-chief is Hilary J. Crichton. The journal has three sections: Peptide Science (established in 1995, published bimonthly), Nucleic Acid Sciences (established in 1997, published four times per year), and Biospectroscopy (merged with Biopolymers in 2004). Peptide Science is the affiliate journal of the American Peptide Society. According to the Journal Citation Reports, the journal has a 2015 impact factor of 2.248, ranking it 39th out of 72 journals in the category "Biophysics" and 186th out of 289 in the category "Biochemistry & Molecular Biology".
