= Paul G. Gassman =

American chemist

Paul George Gassman
- Born: June 22, 1935; Alden, New York, United States
- Died: April 21, 1993 (aged 57); St. Paul, Minnesota, United States
- Education: Cornell University
- Scientific career
- Thesis: Studies of highly strained bicyclic systems. The synthesis and reactions of derivatives of bicyclo-[2, 1, 1]-hexane (1960)
- Doctoral advisor: Jerrold Meinwald

Paul Gassman (June 22, 1935–April 21, 1993) was an American chemist. He is best known for his research in the field of organic chemistry and his service as president of the American Chemical Society and is listed among notable alumni by the Cornell University Graduate School.

== Biography ==
Gassman was the son of Joseph Martin Gassman and Florence Marie Rautenstrauch Gassman, of German Swiss parentage. In 1957, he graduated with a B.S. degree in chemistry from Canisius College in Buffalo, New York and received his Ph.D. in three years from Cornell University in 1960, where he studied under Jerrold Meinwald. He continued at Cornell as a postdoctoral fellow before his appointment as an Assistant Professor of Chemistry at the Ohio State University. After becoming a full professor at Ohio State in 1969, Gassman brought his research to the University of Minnesota in 1974. He served as chair of its chemistry department from 1975 to 1979, and was named a Regents' Professor in 1988.

== Career ==
Gassman's work centered in the areas of organic reaction mechanisms (including the Gassman indole synthesis), mechanisms of catalysis (including hydrocarbon metathesis), X-ray photoelectron spectroscopy, cyclo-addition reactions, enzyme mechanisms, organoelectro-chemistry, carbanion chemistry, synthesis of heterocyclic molecules, oxidation of hydrocarbons, nitrenium ion chemistry, and electron-transfer reactions. This work helped him achieve status as an internationally recognized chemist. serving the American Chemical Society as Chairman of the Division of Organic Chemistry (1981) and eventually as President of the American Chemical Society in 1990. Gassman's research resulted in over 300 publications in scientific journals, 33 patents, and 11 books. During his career, he advised 72 Ph.D. and 13 masters' students, along with dozens of postdoctoral fellows and a number of undergraduates.

He received recognition as a Fulbright Scholar (1988), membership in both the National Academy of Sciences (1989) and the American Academy of Arts and Sciences (1992), and his notable awards included the Chemical Pioneers Award of the American Institute of Chemists (1990), and the National Catalyst Award of the Chemical Manufacturers Association (1990). In 1989, he was elected to the presidency of the 138,000-member American Chemical Society. The day he assumed office was declared "Paul Gassman Day" in Minnesota by Governor Arne H. Carlson. In his service as President of the A.C.S., Gassman said it was his mission to show “the population at large that chemistry has been extremely beneficial, that they are living longer because of chemistry, and that they are living better because of chemistry”

== Death ==
Gassman suffered an aortic dissection at his home on the evening of April 17, 1993. Despite emergency open-heart surgery the following day, he suffered irreversible brain damage and died aged 57 on April 21 without regaining consciousness. The American Chemical Society recognized his service by creating the Paul G. Gassman Distinguished Service Award, granted for outstanding service in the organic chemical community. Both the University of Minnesota, through the Paul G. Gassman Lectureship in Chemistry and Canisius College through the Gassman Memorial Seminar Series host chemistry lecture series in his honor.
