= Talalay process =

Latex foam rubber production technique

The Talalay process is a method of producing molded pieces of latex foam rubber. A liquid latex rubber base is introduced to a closed mold and is then vacuumed of air. The mold is then frozen to stabilize the cell structure. Carbon dioxide gas is introduced and the mold is heated to cure the rubber. Leon, Joseph, and Anselm Talalay developed the "Talalay" process at various commercial entities. B.F. Goodrich in Shelton, Connecticut; Dunlopillo in Pannal, Harrogate, UK; and Vita Talalay in Maastricht, Netherlands made this process commercially practical in the late 1940s. The first Talalay production plants were built in England, Canada, and the United States.

== Product ==
The Talalay process is a complex method that produces highly consistent densities and a specific product "feel." It utilizes many of the same base ingredients as the Dunlop process, but without gellation reagents. The result is marketed as a healthier alternative to petroleum-based foams since petroleum-based foams give off volatile organic compounds as they age. Some marketing for products such as beds that include "natural" latex foams created with the Talalay process sometimes characterize them as 'organic' or as completely natural. However, different methods of producing Talalay alter how natural the end product is. One compound, called styrene-butadiene rubber, is a form of synthetic latex that, when used by Talalay Global, is mixed with the latex from the Hevea tree to form the final Talalay product. Vita Talalay in the Netherlands still produces a Talalay product that does not contain styrene-butadiene and uses the latex from the Hevea tree as the entire base. Today, the Talalay process is primarily produced and further refined by Talalay Global, the leading manufacturer of Talalay latex for bedding and furniture applications.

== Process ==
The process utilizes a closed mold with pre-vacuum, followed by freezing to maintain uniform bubble geometry. Carbon dioxide (CO_{2}) is flooded through the frozen, open foam matrix to form carbonic acid (CO_{2}+H_{2}O→ H_{2}CO_{3}). Much like the addition of sodium fluorosilicate (Na_{2}SiF_{6}) in the Dunlop process, the carbonic acid lowers the pH, thereby causing gelation. In the next process step, vulcanization locks the foam into a uniform bubble distribution.

=== Molding ===
Following the foamer aeration stage, the compound is carefully dispensed into an open mold with exact volume and pattern placement. The Talalay type mold is designed to be closed and sealed with pressure provided by press hydraulics. After closing the mold, a vacuum is applied to the interior, thereby causing the air matrix bubbles to "inflate" and fill out the mold form.

=== Freezing ===
While being supported by the vacuum, the mold and foam mass temperature is reduced to −20 °F (−28 °C) and frozen in place. Because the resultant foam matrix is open, carbon dioxide can be pushed through the structure, thereby forming carbonic acid that moves the pH from above 10 to 7. The reduction in alkalinity triggers the foam to gel in place and hold its shape.

=== Vulcanization ===
The mold temperature can then be incrementally raised to the vulcanization temperature of 230 °F (115 °C) for a measured amount of time. At this point, the foam form can be de-molded and sent to a washing step. Typical molding cycles are 60 minutes. After washing, the foam form is introduced into the vulcanizer stage to complete the cross-linking process. The final step is the drying process where residual moisture is driven off.
