= Alexander H. Popkin =

American chemist and inventor (1913–1987)

- Born: November 7, 1913; New York City, U.S.
- Died: January 23, 1987 (aged 73)
- Education: Brooklyn College (B.S.), Pennsylvania State University (M.S., Ph.D.)
- Known for: Gasoline additives, synthetic lubricants
- Scientific career
- Fields: Chemistry, Invention
- Workplaces: Sun Chemical Company, Maltbie Chemical Company, Esso Research and Engineering Company
- Thesis: (1939)

Alexander H. Popkin, Ph.D. (November 7, 1913 – January 23, 1987) was an American scientist and inventor with 33 US patents and 18 scientific publications.

== Early life and education ==
Popkin was born in New York City, on the lower east side of Manhattan. He received a B.S. in chemistry from Brooklyn College in 1934, an M.S. in organic chemistry from Pennsylvania State University in 1935, and a Ph.D. in organic chemistry from Pennsylvania State University in 1939. He was a member of the honorary society of Sigma Xi and listed as a Notable member of the honorary society of Phi Lambda Upsilon.

== Career ==
=== Sun Chemical Company ===
Dr. Popkin began his career at Sun Chemical Company, working there from 1939–1945. He was group head in charge of organic research on new pigments, dyes, and resins for use in printing ink formulations. During World War II, there was a major effort related to new pigments, dyes, and resins from non-critical raw materials. He was involved in confidential research for the National Defense Research Committee (NDRC). Working with Gertrude M. Perretta, who was employed by the General Printing Corporation in New York City, Popkin and Perretta conducted experimental work using non-critical raw material to create synthetic drugs for the control of Malaria and other diseases. Popkin and Perretta co-authored two articles on this research in the Journal of American Chemical Society. Popkin was added to American Men of Science in 1944.

=== Maltbie Chemical Company ===
In 1945 he became director of research at Maltbie Chemical Company with responsibility for the supervision and coordination of organic research and pharmaceutical development, and an advisor to the export department on matters relating to foreign registry of company products, and advisor to the advertising department on matters of dosage forms and labeling.

=== Esso Research and Engineering Company (formerly Standard Oil Development Company) ===
From 1946–1968, Popkin worked at Esso Research and Engineering Company, Linden, NJ in research and development in the areas of motor lubricants, lubricant additives, gasolines, gasoline additives, aviation lubricants. He also researched new applications for asphalt related to water conservation and materials of construction, as well as studies in air pollution. At the 1967 conference of the National Petroleum Refiners Association, Dr. Popkin and Dr. James F. Black, also a scientist from Esso Research and Engineering, both considered experts in asphalt, revealed six new uses of asphalt: retarding the encroachment of desert wastelands, increasing human supplies of food and water, making high quality homes for underdeveloped and developed lands around the world, using it as a potential rainmaker, making better building blocks, and aiding agricultural yields.

Between 1947 and 1970, he obtained 33 US patents as the inventor or co-inventor. The patents were assigned to the following companies: Sun Chemical Company (5 patents), Standard Oil Development Company (9 patents), and Esso Research and Engineering Company (19 patents). His inventions included a major gasoline additive, first Esso commercial low-cost aviation synthetic jet engine lubricant, first Esso military low-cost aviation synthetic jet engine lubricant, two major Esso aviation mineral oil piston engine lubricants, and two major Esso motor oil additives. Some of these inventions were developed into Uniflo Motor Oil 5W-20, a new synthetic lubricant for car and truck engines, and Esso Extra Gasoline containing a detergent additive, which was marketed and advertised as "Put a Tiger in Your Tank."

After taking early retirement from Esso in 1968, he continued working for Esso as a consultant doing research projects in the US Patent office in Washington, DC.

Esso Research and Engineering became Exxon and then ExxonMobil.

== US Patents ==
US Patent Number	Title	Inventor(s)	Assignee Company	Patent Application Date	Patent Issue Date
2,431,889	Mixtures of Diamino Diphenyl Azo Compounds	Alexander H. Popkin	Sun Chemical Corporation	May 2, 1942	Dec 2, 1947
2,433,784	Aminobipphenylsulfonanilide	Alexander H. Popkin	Sun Chemical Corporation	Apr 12, 1943	Dec 30, 1947
2,440,117	Process for Preparing Sulfonamides	Alexander H. Popkin	Sun Chemical Corporation	Mar 11, 1944	Apr 20, 1948
2,441,671	Process for Preparing Sulfonamides	Alexander H. Popkin	Sun Chemical Corporation	Mar 11, 1944	May 18, 1948
2,448,823	Triphenylmethane Dyestuff and Pigment Dyestuffs and Process for Making the Same	Alexander H. Popkin	Sun Chemical Corporation	Mar 11, 1944	Sept 7. 1948
2,559,521	Synthetic Lubricant	Paul V, Smith, Jr. and Alexander H. Popkin	Standard Oil Development Company	Nov 27, 1948	July 3, 1951
2,582,708	Lubricating Oil Additives	Samuel B. Lippincott and Alexander H. Popkin	Standard Oil Development Company	Oct 1, 1948	Jan 15, 1952
2,585,862	Synthetic Lubricants	Paul V. Smith, Jr. and Alexander H. Popkin	Standard Oil Development Company	Nov 1, 1945	Feb 12, 1952
2,601,063	Glycol Esters of Alkyl-Mercapto-Carboxylic Acids	Paul V. Smith, Jr., Louis A. Mikeska, and Alexander H. Popkin	Standard Oil Development Company	Sept 24, 1948	June 17, 1952
2,604,453	New Copolymer Compositions	Alexander H. Popkin	Standard Oil Development Company	Dec 30, 1948	July 22, 1952
2,623,018	Extreme Pressure Lubricant	Elmer B. Cyphers and Alexander H. Popkin	Standard Oil Development Company	Dec 17. 1949	Dec 23, 1952
2,677,662	Lubricating Oil Additives	Louis A. Makeska, Samuel B. Lippincott, and Alexander H. Popkin	Standard Oil Development Company	Aug 2, 1948	May 4, 1954
2,683,119	Compounded Lubricant	Paul V. Smith, Jr., Louis A. Mikeska, and Alexander H. Popkin	Standard Oil Development Company	Nov 16, 1949	July 6, 1954
2,689,223	Viscosity Index Improvers	Alexander H. Popkin and Thomas S. Tutwiler	Standard Oil Development Company	June 22, 1951	Sept 14, 1954
2,703,783	Process for the Clarification of Lubricating Oil Additive Concentrates	Alexander H. Popkin	Esso Research and Engineering Company	Apr 28, 1950	Mar 8, 1955
2,721,877	Lubricating Oil Additives and a Process for Their Preparation	Alexander H. Popkin and James F. Black	Esso Research and Engineering Company	Aug 22, 1951	Oct 25, 1955
2,721,878	Strong Acid as a Polymerization Modifier in the Production of Liquid Polymers	Alexander H. Popkin	Esso Research and Engineering Company	Aug 18, 1951	Oct 25, 1955
2,721,879	Aldehydes as Polymerization Modifiers in the Production of Liquid Polymers	Alexander H. Popkin and James M. Phelan	Esso Research and Engineering Company	Aug 18, 1951	Oct 25, 1955
2,761,766	Combustion Test	Alexander H. Popkin	Esso Research and Engineering Company	May 1, 1953	Sept 4, 1956
2,762,774	Four Depressant-Detergent Additive Combination	Alexander H. Popkin	Esso Research and Engineering Company	Apr 21, 1953	Sept 11, 1956
2,785,128	Metal Salts of Organic Acids of Phosphorus	Alexander H. Popkin	Esso Research and Engineering Company	Sept 20, 1954	Mar 12, 1957
2,810,744	Polymerization Process for Preparing Lubricant Additives and Products	Alexander H. Popkin	Esso Research and Engineering Company	Mar 25, 1955	Oct 22, 1957
2,849,398	Mineral-Based Lubricating Oils and Methods for Using Same	Leonard E. Moody and Alexander H. Popkin	Esso Research and Engineering Company	Aug 19, 1953	Aug 26, 1958
2,906,729	Method for Color Improvement of Polymetric Four Point Depressors	Alexander H. Popkin	Esso Research and Engineering Company	Aug 31, 1953	Sept 29, 1959
3,034,877	Leaded Gasolines	Alexander H. Popkin	Esso Research and Engineering Company	Aug 5, 1957	May 15, 1962
3,047,372	Anti-Knock Gasoline	Alexander H. Popkin	Esso Research and Engineering Company	Nov 29, 1957	July 31, 1962
3,099,682	Preparation, Treatment and Storage, Under a Nitrogen Blanket, of the Diesters of Dicarboxylic Acids and Oxo Alcohols	Alexander H. Popkin	Esso Research and Engineering Company	Dec 24, 1959	July 30, 1963
3,325,565	Mixed Monoalkyl and Dialkyl Esters of Phosphoric Acid Partially Neutralized with a Primary Alkyl Amine	Alexander H. Popkin	Esso Research and Engineering Company	Oct 1, 1963	Jun 13, 1967
3,334,977	Gasoline Composition	Alexander H. Popkin	Esso Research and Engineering Company	Oct 23, 1963	Aug 8, 1967
3,382,139	Cementitious Compositions for Bituminous Substrates	Alexander H. Popkin, George M. Kagan, and Roman Slysh	Esso Research and Engineering Company	Dec 24, 1964	May 7, 1968
3,384,466	Amine-Phosphates as Multi-Functional Fuel Additives	Alexander H. Popkin	Esso Research and Engineering Company	Feb 21, 1967	May 21, 1968
3,509,240	Primary Amine Salts of Mono-and Di-Alkyl Phosphoric Acid Esters That Have Been Heat Treated	Alexander H. Popkin	Esso Research and Engineering Company	Feb 20, 1967	April 28, 1970
3,511,676	Nonionic Asphalt Emulsifiers	Mervin E. Conn and Alexander H. Popkin	Esso Research and Engineering Company	Sept 18, 1967	May 12, 1970

== Publications ==
- "Sterols. X. Cholesterol Derivatives," Journal of the American Chemical Society, April 1, 1937
- "The Action of Primary Grignard Reagents on t-Butylacetyl Chloride," Journal of the American Chemical Society, October 1, 1938
- "Isomerization during the Preparation of n-Amyl Chloride," Journal of the American Chemical Society, October 1, 1938
- "The Reducing Action of Primary Grignard Reagents with Trimethylacetyl Chloride," Journal of the American Chemical Society, November 1, 1938
- "The Action of Primary Grignard Reagents with t-Butylacetyl Chloride. II¹, Journal of the American Chemical Society, November 1, 1938
- "The Common Basis of Intramolecular Rearrangements. VI.¹ Reactions of Neopentyl Iodide," Journal of the American Chemical Society, June 1, 1939
- "Reaction of Neopentyl Chloride with Sodium," Journal of the American Chemical Society, June 1, 1939
- "Attempted Separation of Isomeric Hexenes by Fractional Distillation," Journal of the American Chemical Society, April 1, 1940
- "The Common Basis of Intramolecular Rearrangements. VII.¹ Inapplicability of a Free Radical Mechanism. Formation of 1,1-DimethylcyclopropAerane and Neopentane by the Action of Sodium on Neopentyl Chloride. Relation to the Mechanism of the Wurtz Reaction," Journal of the American Chemical Society, January 1, 1941
- "Grignard Reductions. IX.¹'²'³ Further Studies on the Reduction of Acid Halides," Journal of the American Chemical Society, March 1, 1941
- "Additions and Corrections. The Reducing Action of Primary Grignard Reagents with Trimethylacetyl Chloride," Journal of the American Chemical Society, December 1, 1942
- "Derivatives of Biphenylsulfonamides. I. Preparation of p-(o-Aminophenyl)-benzenesulfonamide,¹" Journal of the American Chemical Society, November 1, 1943
- "Derivatives of Biphenylsulfonamide. II.¹ Derivatives of p-(o-Aminophenyl)-benzenesulfonamide,²" Journal of the American Chemical Society, November 1, 1943
- "Orientation in the Biphenyl System. The Preparation of 2- and 4-Aminobiphenyl-4'-sulfonamides," Journal of the American Chemical Society, May 1, 1944
- "Orientation in the Biphenyl System.¹ Derivatives of 2-P.²" Journal of the American Chemical Society, May 1, 1944
- "Dibasic Acid Esters," Synthetic Lubricants, Reinhold Publishing Corporation, New York, NY, 1962
- "New Roles for Asphalt in Controlling Man's Environment," National Petroleum Refiners Association, Tech. AM-67-16, San Antonio, Texas, April 3–5, 1967
- "Low Cost Drinking Water from Asphalt Catchments," International Conference on Water for Peace, Washington, DC, 1968

== Professional Associations and Activities ==
- American Chemical Society, 1937–1987 (Elected to the position of Area V representative for the Division of Petroleum Chemistry of the American Chemical Society in 1966.)
- Society of Automotive Engineers, 1952–1970
- Chemists' Club, 1939–1947
- Association of Research Directors, Co-founder; Secretary-Treasurer, 1945–1948
