= Charles Lathrop Parsons Award =

American Chemical Society award

- Awarded for: Public service
- Date: 1952
- Country: United States
- Presented by: American Chemical Society
- Reward: $5,000
- Website: https://www.acs.org/content/acs/en/funding-and-awards/awards/national/bytopic/charles-lathrop-parsons-award.html

The Charles Lathrop Parsons Award is usually a biennial award that recognizes outstanding public service by a member of the American Chemical Society (ACS). Recipients are chosen by the American Chemical Society Board of Directors, from a list of no more than five recipients presented by the ACS Committee on Grants and Awards. They have the discretion to offer the award in successive years if they so wish. It was established in 1952, and is named in honor of its first recipient, Charles Lathrop Parsons. The first woman to receive the award was Mary L. Good in 1991.

== Award recipients ==
- 2023 William F. Carroll Jr.
- 2021 Ruth Woodall
- 2019 Attila E. Pavlath
- 2017 John I. Brauman
- 2015 Paul H. L. Walter
- 2013 Geraldine L. Richmond
- 2011 Michael E. Strem
- 2009 Glenn A. Crosby and Jane L. Crosby
- 2007 S. Allen Heininger
- 2005 Marye Anne Fox
- 2003 Zafra M. Lerman
- 2001 Richard N. Zare
- 1999 Mike McCormack
- 1995 Alfred Bader
- 1993 B. R. Stanerson
- 1991 Mary L. Good
- 1989 Arnold O. Beckman
- 1987 Norman Hackerman
- 1985 Franklin A. Long
- 1983 James G. Martin
- 1978 Charles G. Overberger
- 1976 William Oliver Baker
- 1974 Russell W. Peterson
- 1973 Charles C. Price
- 1970 W. Albert Noyes, Jr.
- 1967 Donald F. Hornig
- 1964 Glenn T. Seaborg
- 1961 George B. Kistiakowsky
- 1958 Roger Adams
- 1955 James B. Conant
- 1952 Charles Lathrop Parsons

== See also ==
- List of chemistry awards
