= Robert W. Parry =

Robert W. Parry (October 1, 1917 – December 1, 2006) was a professor of chemistry at the University of Michigan and the University of Utah. Parry served as the President of the American Chemical Society in 1982. Among his awards was the Priestley Medal in 1993.
