= Thomas H. Lane =

American organic chemist (born 1952)

- Born: 1952 (age 73–74)
- Education: Purdue University (B.S.); Central Michigan University (M.S.); Open University (Ph.D.)
- Scientific career
- Fields: Organosilicon chemistry
- Workplaces: Dow Corning; Delta College

Thomas H. Lane (born 1952) is an American organic chemist. He worked at the Dow Corning Corporation and served as president of the American Chemical Society in 2009.

== Early life and education ==
Lane was born in 1952. He earned a B.S. in chemistry with honors from Purdue University in 1974, an M.S. from Central Michigan University in 1979, and a Ph.D. from Open University in 1990.

== Career ==
He became chairman of the Delta College Board of Trustees in 2005. He worked at the Dow Corning Corporation for 35 years in various positions before becoming president of the American Chemical Society (ACS) in 2009. As immediate past-president in 2010, Lane represented ACS in signing a three-year memorandum of collaboration with the Chinese Chemical Society, intended to increase cooperation between chemical scientists in the United States and China. He is a Fellow of the Royal Society of Chemistry. He was vice-president at Delta College. In 2011, he was named a Fellow of the American Chemical Society. He was awarded the Henry Hill Award from the ACS in 2016.
