= Journal of Polymer Science =

- Discipline: Chemistry, materials science
- Language: English
- Edited by: Joseph W Krumpfer

Publication details
- History: 1946–present
- Publisher: John Wiley & Sons
- Frequency: Bimonthly
- Open access: Hybrid

Standard abbreviations
- ISO 4: J. Polym. Sci.

Indexing
- Journal of Polymer Science
- CODEN: JPSHBC
- ISSN: 2642-4169
- OCLC no.: 1090354499

Links
- Journal homepage; Online archive

Journal of Polymer Science is a peer-reviewed journal of polymer science currently published by John Wiley & Sons. It was originally established as the Journal of Polymer Science in 1946 by Interscience Publishers and the founding editor Herman F. Mark, but it was split in various parts in 1962. The journal has undergone re-organization several times since. In 2020, the journal will consolidate in one single publication. The editor-in-chief is Joseph W Krumpfer.

== History ==
Establishment

- Journal of Polymer Science (1946–1962), ISSN 0022-3832

First re-organization

- Journal of Polymer Science Part A: General Papers (1963–1965), ISSN 0449-2951
  - Journal of Polymer Science Part A-1: Polymer Chemistry (1966–September 1972), ISSN 0449-296X
  - Journal of Polymer Science Part A-2: Polymer Physics (1966–September 1972), ISSN 0449-2978
- Journal of Polymer Science Part B: Polymer Letters (1963–September 1972), ISSN 0449-2986
- Journal of Polymer Science Part C: Polymer Symposia (1963–1972), ISSN 0449-2994

The coverage of biopolymers was split into a distinct journal, Biopolymers.

Second re-organization

- Journal of Polymer Science: Polymer Physics Edition (October 1972 – 1985), ISSN 0098-1273
- Journal of Polymer Science: Polymer Letters Edition (October 1972 – 1985), ISSN 0361-1027
- Journal of Polymer Science: Polymer Chemistry Edition (1973–1985), ISSN 0887-6266
- Journal of Polymer Science: Polymer Symposia (1973–1986), ISSN 0360-8905

Third re-organization

- Journal of Polymer Science Part A: Polymer Chemistry (1986–2019), ISSN 0887-624X
- Journal of Polymer Science Part B: Polymer Physics (1986–2019), ISSN 0887-6266
- Journal of Polymer Science Part C: Polymer Letters (1986–1990), ISSN 0887-6258

Fourth re-organization

- Journal of Polymer Science (2020 onwards), ISSN 2642-4169
