= Harold S. Johnston =

American chemist (1920–2012)

- Born: October 11, 1920; Woodstock, Georgia
- Died: October 20, 2012 (aged 92); Kensington, California
- Education: Caltech
- Known for: Ozone depletion research
- Awards: National Medal of Science (1997)
- Scientific career
- Fields: Atmospheric chemistry
- Workplaces: Stanford University; UC Berkeley

Harold S. "Hal" Johnston (October 11, 1920 – October 20, 2012) was an American scientist who studied chemical kinetics and atmospheric chemistry. After beginning his teaching career at Stanford University, he was a faculty member and administrator at the University of California, Berkeley for nearly 35 years. In 1971, Johnston authored a paper suggesting that environmental pollutants could erode the ozone layer.

Johnston was elected to several scholarly organizations, including the National Academy of Sciences, the American Academy of Arts and Sciences and the American Association for the Advancement of Science. He won the National Medal of Science in 1997.

== Early life ==
Johnston was born in Woodstock, Georgia, to Florine and Smith Lemon Johnston. His family had been in the area since shortly after the Cherokee were forced out during the Trail of Tears. Johnston's paternal grandfather, who had the given name Doctor Medicine Johnston Jr, owned a general store but believed that education was a waste of time. Johnston's father wanted to become a minister, but he could only afford to attend college briefly before acceding to his family's demands to help them run the store.

Johnston, who was one of four sons, lived on a Georgia farm when he was young. In the early 1930s, Johnston contracted rheumatic fever and the illness affected his heart. A physician uncle told Johnston's father not to send Johnston to college because the young man would not survive long enough to get much use out of the education. Johnston said he later learned that the disease was associated with an average survival period of fifteen years at the time. Florine and Smith Johnston valued education for their children, however, and they sent all of their sons to college.

After going off to Emory University with aspirations of becoming a journalist, Johnston soon realized that the U.S. was headed toward World War II and that a science degree would serve him better. Johnston completed an undergraduate degree in chemistry and a minor in English literature. He received a Ph.D. in chemistry and physics from the California Institute of Technology. As a doctoral student, Johnston focused on the interaction of ozone and the pollutant nitrogen dioxide. While at Caltech, he joined in a secret defense project that involved protecting the country against the use of gas warfare.

== Career ==
From 1947 to 1956, Johnston taught at Stanford University. While there, he was named to the editorial board of the Journal of the American Chemical Society. In the early 1950s, Johnston furthered the air pollution work of Arie Jan Haagen-Smit by showing that free-radical reactions underlay the photochemical process leading to smog. Throughout his career, much of Johnston's work involved understanding the kinetics of nitrogen oxides. He returned to Caltech as a faculty member for a year in 1956.

From 1957 until his retirement in 1991, Johnston was a professor at the University of California, Berkeley. From 1966 to 1970, Johnston was the dean of Berkeley's college of chemistry. Johnston mentored undergraduate and graduate students, including future Nobel Prize winner Dudley R. Herschbach and future National Medal of Science winner Susan Solomon. He also made large contributions to the theory of elementary chemical reactions. He wrote a popular textbook on reaction rate theory.

Johnston became best known for his work related to ozone. In a 1971 paper, he posited that pollution from supersonic aircraft in the stratosphere could deplete the ozone layer. Because it suggested for the first time that human activity could impact the integrity of the environment, Johnston's ozone research received some criticism and resistance. However, two environmental regulatory programs were formed as a result of his findings – the Climatic Impact Assessment Program (CIAP) and the Stratosphere Protection Program.

== Honors and awards ==
Johnston was elected a member of the National Academy of Sciences (NAS) in 1965. He was elected a fellow of the American Association for the Advancement of Science in 1981. In 1972, Johnston was elected a fellow of the American Academy of Arts and Sciences. He won the Tyler Prize for Environmental Achievement in 1983. He received the NAS Award for Chemistry in Service to Society in 1993. Four years later, Bill Clinton awarded him the National Medal of Science. In 1998, Johnston received the Roger Revelle Medal from the American Geophysical Union.

== Later life ==
Even in the late 1990s, Johnston said that he had lived most of his life with "a moving 10-year life expectancy" because of his early bout with rheumatic fever, but he remained in good health until he was more than 90 years old. He died in 2012; he was 92. Johnston was survived by his wife of 64 years, Mary Ella, and their four children, as well as several grandchildren and great-grandchildren.
