= Paul S. Anderson =

American chemist (born 1938)

- Born: February 3, 1938 (age 88); Concord, Vermont
- Awards: Perkin Medal (2002), Priestley Medal (2006)

Paul S. Anderson (born February 3, 1938) is an American chemist. He worked at Merck, DuPont-Merck, and Bristol-Myers Squibb.

== Early life and education ==
Paul S. Anderson was born February 3, 1938, in Concord, Vermont, and grew up in Swanton, Vermont. He attended Highgate High School, then went on to attend the University of Vermont, receiving his B.S. in chemistry in 1959. He then studied at the University of New Hampshire, receiving his Ph.D. in chemistry in 1963. He briefly accepted a post-doctoral fellowship with Jerrold Meinwald at Cornell University.

== Career ==
Anderson accepted a senior research position at the Merck, Sharp & Dohme Research Laboratories.

== Awards ==
In 1995 he received the E. B. Hershberg Award from the American Chemical Society for his work on medicinally-active substances. Other significant awards include the Perkin Medal in 2002, the NAS Award for Chemistry in Service to Society in 2003 and the Priestley Medal in 2006.

He was the 1997 President of the American Chemical Society.
