= Global Interdependence Center =

The Global Interdependence Center (GIC) is a Philadelphia-based non-profit organization that holds conferences and programming to increase global dialogue and promote free trade, in order to improve cooperation and understanding among nation states, with the goal of reducing international conflicts and improving worldwide living standards.

== History ==
The GIC was founded in 1976 during Philadelphia's Bicentennial Celebration at convocation of leading United Nations and U.S. officials. Its vision was affirmed in a Declaration of Interdependence, which was crafted by historian Henry Steele Commager and signed by international dignitaries. Early leaders in the organization included Nobel Laureate Dr. Lawrence Klein, Benjamin Franklin Professor of Economics and Finance at the University of Pennsylvania.

== Notable programming ==
GIC hosts and sponsors many programs throughout the year, both in Philadelphia, where it is based, and abroad. Programming comprises international trips, domestic conferences and roundtable discussions. Included among these programs are:

Annual Monetary and Trade Conference: This gathering together of global leaders has been held since 1979. Past speakers include Paul Volcker, chair of the International Accounting Standards Board and former chairman of the Board of Governors of the Federal Reserve System, Lawrence Kudlow and Robert Hormats, noted free-market economists, as well as chief economists for the International Monetary Fund and representatives from global finance and trade organizations.

The Central Banking Series: This series assembles well-known bankers to speak on their countries' monetary policies, their views on U.S. economics and the business ramifications of monetary systems. Recent speakers have included Christian Noyer, governor of the Banque de France and Richard Fisher, president of the Federal Reserve Bank of Dallas.

GIC Abroad: Delegations have visited France, Ireland, Estonia, Chile, South Africa and Israel. Delegations generally include business leaders from the United States as well as representatives from central banks of various nations.

Celebration of Interdependence: Formerly the Annual Black Tie Gala, the annual Celebration in Philadelphia sees the presentation of the Global Citizen Award to individuals who demonstrate exceptional service to the increasingly global community. Recent honorees include Anthony Santomero, former president of the Philadelphia Federal Reserve Bank, in 2005, Michael Heavener, executive vice president and head of Wachovia Bank's Global Financial Institution and Trade Division, in 2006, Dr. Constantine Papadakis, president of Drexel University, in 2007, Edward G. Boehne, former president of the Philadelphia Federal Reserve Bank, in 2008, and long-time Board Members Sharon Javie and Bill Dunkelberg in 2012. In addition, Dr. Roger W. Ferguson Jr., president and CEO of TIAA-CREF, was awarded the Fred Heldring Global Leadership Award in 2006.

== Recent programming ==
Date	Location	Title
January 15, 2014	New York, N.Y.	Puerto Rico Debt: Questions and Answers
February 6, 2014	Sarasota, Fla.	Economic Outlook with Eric Rosengren
February 24, 2014	Phoenix, Ariz.	Southwest Economic Summit
March 10–11, 2014	Paris, France	Monetary Policy and Banks and the Rise of Global Protectionism
April 16, 2014	Philadelphia, Pa.	32nd Annual Monetary and Trade Conference
May 8, 2014	London, U.K.	Monetary Policy and Currency Issues in 2014: QE or Not QE
May 19, 2014	New York, N.Y.	Managing Currency Risk in the ETF Space
June 19, 2014	Virtual	Transitioning to a New Equilibrium of a Growth-Driven Market
July 11, 2014	Jackson Hole, Wyo.	Sixth Annual Rocky Mountain Economic Summit
July 14, 2014	Salt Lake City, Utah	The Bottom Line of Disabilities
July 30, 2014	Virtual	What to Expect from the FOMC
August 27, 2014	Virtual	Twenty-One Quarters and Counting. How Long will the Expansion Last?
September 10, 2014	Virtual	The Ebola Virus: Chilling
September 19, 2014	Philadelphia, Pa.	Gearing for the Future of Risk Management
September 24, 2014	Virtual	The Pythagorean Theorem of Financial Repression
October 9, 2014	Philadelphia, Pa.	Aluminum Futures: Global Interdependence and Extractive Industries
October 17, 2014	Philadelphia, Pa.	Celebration of Interdependence
December 15, 2014	Philadelphia, Pa.	The Nordic Economic Model: Successes, Challenges and the Future
February 2, 2015	Sarasota, Fla.	The Economic Outlook
February 18, 2015	New York, N.Y.	Commodities
March 23, 2015	Paris, France	New Policies for the Post Crisis Era
July 10, 2015	Jackson Hole, Wyo.	Seventh Annual Rocky Mountain Economic Summit

and
