= Vladimir Haensel =

American chemical engineer

Vladimir Haensel (1 September 1914 – 15 December 2002) was an American chemical engineer who invented the platforming process - a platinum catalytic process for reforming petroleum hydrocarbons into gasoline. In addition, he was influential in the creation of catalytic converters for automobiles.

== Life ==
Haensel was born 1 September 1914 in Freiburg, Germany, but grew up in Moscow where his father Paul Haensel was a university professor of economics. He emigrated to the US in 1930 when his father took up an academic position. He received a BS degree in general engineering from Northwestern University, and a master's in chemical engineering from Massachusetts Institute of Technology in 1937, joining the Universal Oil Products Company (UOP) the same year. While there he worked for a Ph.D. in chemistry from Northwestern University, which was awarded in 1941.

Following World War II, Dr. Haensel went to Europe under the auspices of the U.S. Petroleum Administration for War to evaluate German research on synthetic fuels.

In UOP he progressed to become vice-president and director of research (1969) and vice-president for science and technology (1972–79). In 1980 he became professor of chemical engineering at the University of Massachusetts Amherst, a position he held until his death, on 15 December 2002. He was survived by his wife, Hertha Skala Haensel.

== Work ==
Haensel worked on surface catalysts, patenting various methods for improving chemical processes in the oil industry. Platinum was known to chemists as a catalyst, but was considered too expensive for industrial use. Haensel, however, understood that only the surface mattered, so produced ceramic supports with tiny amounts of platinum metal on the surface, eventually showing that 0.01% could be effective. It has since been realised that the platinum was in the form of nanoparticles, long before this idea was common. The metal combined with the acid surface of alumina to carry out two chemical processes, resulting in the production of gasoline with a higher octane rating. At that time, octane rating was improved by the addition of anti-knock agents such as tetraethyllead. The development of the platforming process allowed the eventual removal of lead from gasoline. In addition, hydrogen was produced, which was valuable in itself but also helped to remove sulfur, giving a cleaner, more environmentally friendly process.

Furthermore, the catalyst produced aromatic compounds such as benzene, valuable for the chemical industry and the developing plastics industry. Thus Haensel had a major impact on three industries, and on the US economy. This was recognised in his receipt of the first National Academy of Sciences Award for Chemistry in Service to Society, 1981, "For his outstanding research in the catalytic reforming of hydrocarbons, that has greatly enhanced the economic value of our petroleum natural resources".

In the 1950s the source of photochemical smog was established as automobile exhaust emissions. In his senior position in UOP, from 1956 to 1974, Haensel directed the research programs which led to catalytic converters.

He was the inventor or co-inventor of 145 US patents.

In his later years (1981–1998), Haensel was an educator, encouraging undergraduates and postgraduates while remaining in touch with industry as a part-time consultant. His success was shown by receiving the Chancellor's Outstanding Teacher Award of the University of Massachusetts.

== Honors and awards ==
- member of the US National Academy of Sciences
- member of the National Academy of Engineering
- American Chemical Society ACS Award in Petroleum Chemistry 1952
- American Chemical Society E. V. Murphree Award in Industrial and Engineering Chemistry 1965
- Perkin Medal 1967
- Golden Plate Award of the American Academy of Achievement 1967
- National Medal of Science 1973
- NAS Award for Chemistry in Service to Society 1981
- Charles Stark Draper Prize 1997
- American Institute of Chemical Engineers Professional Progress Award
