= Marinda Li Wu =

American chemist

- Education: Ohio State University, University of Illinois
- Scientific career
- Fields: Chemistry
- Workplaces: Dow Chemical Company, Science is Fun!

Marinda Li Wu is an American chemist, who has worked for more than 30 years in the chemical industry, primarily with Dow Chemical Company, in research and development and plastics marketing. She was involved in early research on the recycling of plastics and environmental sustainability. She has also worked as an entrepreneur, and founded the organization "Science is Fun!" to interest students in science. She holds 7 U.S. Patents.

Wu has been a long-time member of the American Chemical Society (ACS) and has worked with it at various levels, most importantly as its 2013 president. She is the eighth woman president and the first Asian American to serve as president of the society. The theme of her presidency was "Partners for Progress and Prosperity". In 2015, she was named a fellow of the American Chemical Society.

== Education ==
Marinda Li Wu received a B.S. in chemistry from Ohio State University in 1971, and a Ph.D. in inorganic chemistry from the University of Illinois in 1976. She chose to go to Illinois because she wanted to work with Professor Russell Drago. She was told on arrival that he did not work with female students, but she convinced him to accept her as his second woman graduate student.

== Work for STEM ==
She is known for her support of STEM (science, technology, engineering and mathematics) education through public outreach initiatives such as “Family Science Nights” connecting the California Section of ACS with school districts in the San Francisco Bay Area, and initiatives with libraries and restaurants. She founded the organization "Science is Fun!" to support science education. She serves on the advisory board for the non-profit "Catalyst for Success".
