= ISO 4 =

Standard for abbreviated names of serial publications

ISO 4 (Information and documentation — Rules for the abbreviation of title words and titles of publications) is an international standard which defines a uniform system for the abbreviation of serial publication titles, i.e., titles of publications such as scientific journals that are published in regular installments.

== History ==
It was initially published in 1972 (ISO 4:1972), with a second edition published in 1984 (ISO 4:1984), and the third edition in 1997 (ISO 4:1997).

The International Organization for Standardization (ISO) has appointed the ISSN International Centre as the registration authority for ISO 4. It maintains the List of Title Word Abbreviations (LTWA), which contains standard abbreviations for words commonly found in serial titles. The most recent LTWA was updated on 26 February 2024. As of April 2026, it includes over 37,000 abbreviations across more than 60 languages.

One provision of ISO 4 is that components of compound words should be abbreviated. For hyphenated terms, each part is treated as a standalone word; for example, African-American becomes Afr.Am., typically with periods and no spaces between components. However, for unhyphenated compound words, the standard allows initial components to remain unabbreviated before a final abbreviated segment "if required by the national practice of a given language." For instance, while the German compound Altertumswissenschaft (the study of antiquity) could be abbreviated Altert.wiss. by strictly dividing its components, it is more commonly abbreviated as Altertumswiss. to reduce ambiguity and adhere to German orthographic norms.

A major use of ISO 4 is to abbreviate the names of scientific journals using the LTWA. For instance, under ISO 4 standards, the Journal of Biological Chemistry is cited as J. Biol. Chem., and the Journal of Polymer Science Part A should be cited as J. Polym. Sci. A (capitalization is not specified by the standard). The standard notes that "Full stops shall only be used to indicate an abbreviation. Full stops may be omitted from abbreviated words in applications that require limited use of punctuation" (section 4.6).

== See also ==
- ISSN
- CODEN

Preceded by ISO 3	Lists of ISOs; ISO 4	Succeeded by ISO 5
