= Ernest L. Eliel =

American chemist

Ernest Ludwig Eliel (December 28, 1921 – September 18, 2008) was an organic chemist born in Cologne, Germany. Among his awards were the Priestley Medal in 1996 and the NAS Award for Chemistry in Service to Society in 1997.

When the Nazis came to power, he left Germany and moved to Scotland, then Canada, then Cuba. He received his B.S. from the University of Havana in 1946. He moved to the United States in 1946 and taught at the University of Notre Dame from 1948. In 1972 he moved to be the W.R. Kenan, Jr. Professor of Chemistry at the University of North Carolina at Chapel Hill until his retirement in 1993. Eliel was elected a Fellow of the American Academy of Arts and Sciences in 1980. In 1981, Eliel became a founding member of the World Cultural Council. He served as president of the American Chemical Society in 1992. In 1995 he received the George C. Pimentel Award in Chemical Education, and in 1996 he was awarded the Priestley Medal of the American Chemical Society. He died in Chapel Hill, North Carolina.

His research focussed on the stereochemistry and conformational analysis of flexible organic molecules, including derivatives of cyclohexane and saturated heterocyclic rings, using nuclear magnetic resonance spectroscopy (NMR) extensively. His 1962 textbook Stereochemistry of Carbon Compounds influenced generations of organic chemists. The most recent edition is Stereochemistry of Organic Compounds, co-authored in 1994 with Samuel H. Wilen.
