= Albert C. Zettlemoyer =

American chemist (1915–1991)

- Born: July 13, 1915; United States
- Died: January 27, 1991 (aged 75); Bethlehem, Pennsylvania
- Education: Lehigh University
- Occupation: University professor
- Scientific career
- Fields: Chemist
- Workplaces: Massachusetts Institute of Technology

Albert Charles Zettlemoyer (July 13, 1915 – January 27, 1991) was an American chemist, researcher and university professor.

== Life ==
He was born on 13 July 1915.

He died on 27 January 1991 in Bethlehem, Pennsylvania.

== Education ==
He attended the Lehigh University, where he completed his B.S. degree in chemical engineering in 1936 and an M.S. degree in 1938. He completed his Ph.D. in physical chemistry from Massachusetts Institute of Technology in 1941.

== Career ==
He became the president of the American Chemical Society in 1981. He also served as the provost and vice president of Lehigh University.

He published more than 230 technical articles and held 10 patents.
