= Phi Lambda Upsilon =

American honorary society for chemistry

- ΦΛΥ
- Founded: March 1899; 127 years ago University of Illinois
- Type: Honor
- Affiliation: Independent
- Status: Active
- Emphasis: Chemistry
- Scope: National
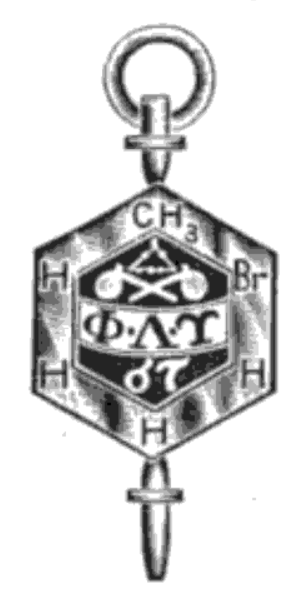
- Member badge
- Colors: Pink Litmus and Blue Litmus
- Symbol: Retort, Liebig bulb, formula for ortho-bromotoluene
- Publication: The Register
- Chapters: 75 active
- Members: 55,000 lifetime
- Headquarters: c/o Dr. Deborah Bromfield Lee; Department of Chemistry and Physics; Florida Southern College; 111 Lake Hollinsworth Drive; Lakeland, Florida 33801-5698; United States
- Website: philambdaupsilon.org

Phi Lambda Upsilon National Honorary Chemical Society (ΦΛΥ) was founded in 1899 at the Noyes Laboratory of the University of Illinois. Phi Lambda Upsilon was the first honor society dedicated to scholarship in a single discipline, chemistry.

== History ==
Phi Lambda Upsilon was founded as an honorary chemical society in March 1899, at the University of Illinois. Its founders were the senior member of the campus chemical club, Horace C. Porter, Paul A. Rudnik and Fred C. Koch. They were assisted by Professors A. W. Palmer, H. S. Grindley and W. W. Parr.

The society was established "to promote high scholarship and investigation in all branches of pure and applied chemistry". The founders envisioned a society that would serve the field of chemistry in much the same manner as Phi Beta Kappa does the humanities; Sigma Xi for scientific research; and Tau Beta Pi for engineering. Phi Lambda Upsilon was the first honor society dedicated to a single scientific discipline.

In 1906, Beta chapter was established at the University of Wisconsin. Five more chapters were chartered prior to June 28, 1911, when the national society was organized at a convention in Indianapolis, Indiana. By 1920, the group also had an alumni chapter in Chicago.

Thereafter the Phi Lambda Upsilon gradually lifted standards for membership and developed programs within the chapters. Phi Lambda Upsilon had established 78 chapters with approximately 60,000 members.

== Symbols ==
Phi Lambda Upsilon's badge is a key shaped like a hexagon. On its face is a white band bearing the Greek letters "ΦΛΥ". Above the band are cross retorts and a Liebig bulb. The formula for an organic compound is around the edge of the hexegon.

Members may wear an honor cord at graduation. The society's colors are pink litmus and blue litmus. Its publication is The Register.

== Membership ==
Members are elected by chapters or at-large on the basis of academic achievement. Membership includes exceptional students of pure and applied chemistry selected from the junior, senior, or graduate classes, and from qualified faculty, staffs, as well as from selected post-doctoral students engaged in chemical endeavors in affiliation with qualified institutions of higher learning.

Honorary membership is the highest honor the Society bestows upon an individual. Honorary members are scientists of national or international reputation and are chosen by a vote of the chapters. Regular membership does not preclude later election to honorary membership. This honor has been bestowed upon 210 individuals as of 2004 The roll of honorary members includes the names of prominent American and foreign chemists, including virtually all American Nobel Laureates in Chemistry.

== Governance ==
The executive committee meets triennially with delegates from local chapters nationwide and elects the national officers for the next triennium. National officers are elected from Phi Lambda Upsilon members who are faculty, governmental, or industrial chemists. Voting delegates are graduate or undergraduate members with each chapter who cast one vote on each issue raised or national office. Active chapters may send one voting delegate, although additional delegates from a given chapter and At-large members are invited to attend.

== Chapters ==
Phi Lambda Upsilon has established 78 chapters, with 75 active chapters in 2025.

== Notable members ==
- Daniel W. Armstrong (1975), professor at the University of Texas at Arlington
- Robert G. Bergman (1964) professor at the University of California, Berkeley
- St. Elmo Brady, first African American to obtain a Ph.D. in chemistry in the United States
- H. N. Cheng, chemist with U.S. Department of Agriculture in its Agricultural Research Service
- Granville C. Coggs, medical doctor and one of the 1007 documented Tuskegee Airmen pilots
- John H. Eicher, a Manhattan Project scientist and professor at Miami University in Oxford, Ohio
- Anne E. Giblin, marine biologist, senior scientist and acting director of the Ecosystem Center at the Marine Biological Lab
- Xu Guangxian, chemist and professor at Peking University
- Esmaiel Jabbari (1989), professor of chemical engineering at the University of South Carolina
- Donald L. Katz (1969), professor and chairman of the Chemical Engineering Department at the University of Michigan
- Riki Kobayashi, professor of chemical engineering at Rice University
- Frank Curry Mathers, professor at Indiana University Bloomington
- Alfred C. Nelson, professor at the University of Denver
- Melvin Spencer Newman, Ohio State University professor, best known for inventing the Newman projection
- Charles G. Overberger, professor and department chair at the University of Michigan
- George Parshall, organometallic chemist and senior scientist at E. I. du Pont de Nemours and Company
- Herman Pines (1946), research professor of chemistry of Northwestern University
- Alexander H. Popkin, inventor scientist with Esso
- John H. Sides, United States Navy admiral
- Otto J. M. Smith, professor at University of California, Berkeley
- Kenneth Symington (1953) civic leader and the last National Executive Commissioner of the Asociación de Scouts de Cuba
- Himie Voxman, director of the School of Music at the University of Iowa

== See also ==
- Honor cords
- Professional fraternities and sororities
