= Paul Haensel =

Soviet economist

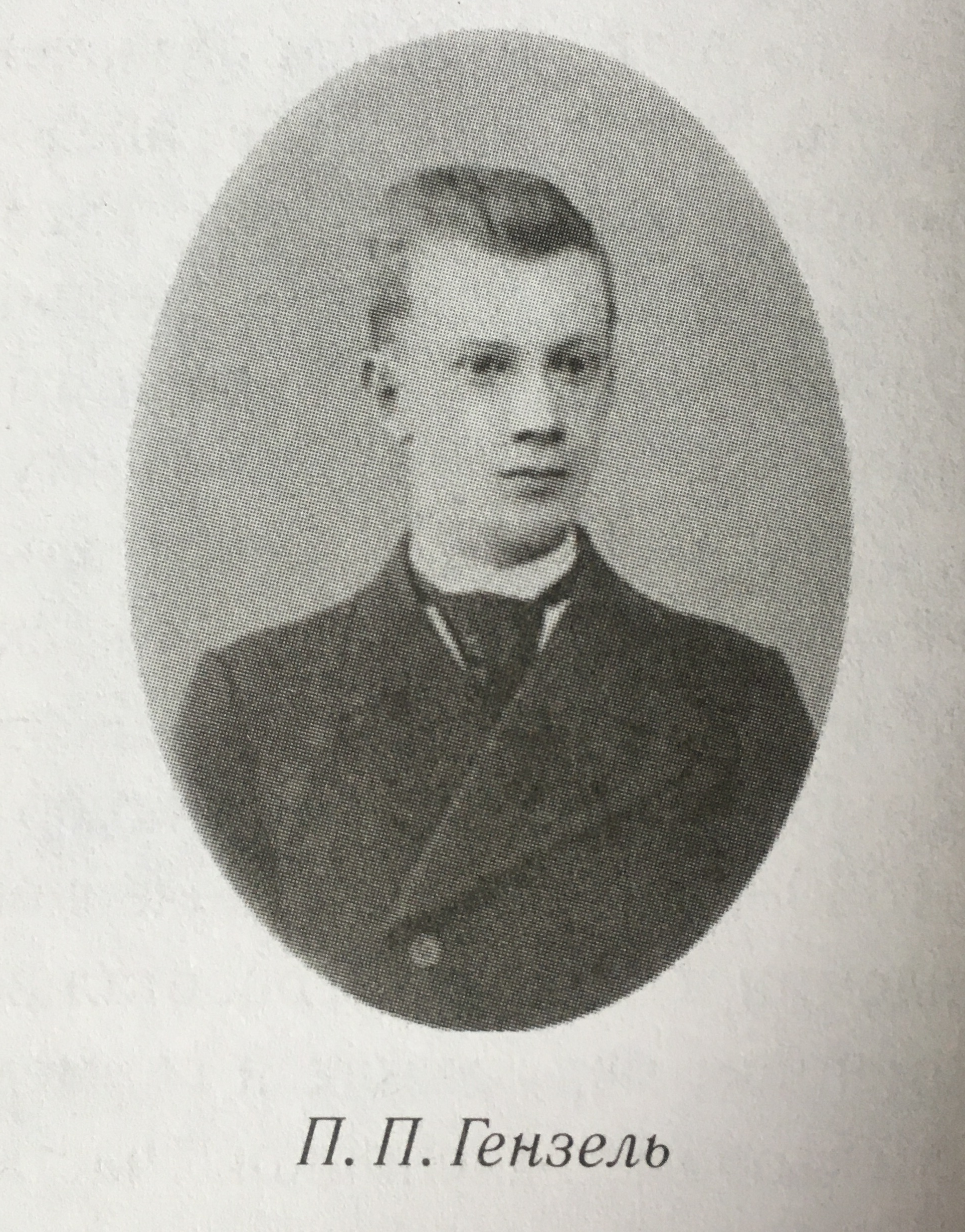
- Гензель Павел Петрович+ (1910)
- Born: January 27, 1878; Moscow
- Died: February 28, 1949 (aged 71); Virginia
- Education: Imperial Moscow University (1902)
- Occupation: Lawyer

Paul Haensel (Russian: Павел Петрович Гензель, Pavel Petrovich Gensel; 8 February 1878 – 28 February 1949) was Russian and American financier, economist and scholar.

== Early life ==
Paul Haensel was born in Moscow in 1878 in the family of merchant. In 1902 he graduated Moscow Practical Commercial Academy. He became a professor of Moscow University in financial law department and in 1918-1920 he worked as a dean of the law school.

In 1921-1928 he was a consultant for the Soviet finance ministry (комиссариат финансов) and a chief of financial department of the Institute of Economical Studies (Институт экономических исследований) in Moscow.

In 1914 his son Vladimir was born who later became a chemical engineer. Paul Haensel had three sons.

== Life in the West ==
Paul Haensel fled Russia in 1928 to become a visiting professor at the University of Graz in Austria and at the London School of Economics. He decided not to return to Soviet Russia.

From 1929 to 1943 he served as a professor of economics in Northwestern University in Chicago.

In 1943 he left his position in Northwestern University and moved to Mary Washington College of University of Virginia where he continued to teach until 1948.

In 1943 he spoke before the US Congressional committee on tax reform.

== Publications ==
- Taxation of craftsmen in Russia. Critical investigation. (1900, in Russian) (Промысловое обложение в России. Опыт критического исследования.) This is Paul Haensel's first publication.
- History of the budget in England. (1903, published in "Научное Слово") (История английского бюджета)
- Inheritance tax in England. (1907, in Russian) (Налог с наследства в Англии: Исследование по истории английских финансов) This is Paul Haensel's master's degree dissertation.
- Bibliography of the financial sciences. (1908, in Russian) (Библиография финансовой науки)
- New trends in communal taxation in the west. (1909, in Russian) (Новые течения в коммунальном обложении на Западе) This is Paul Haensel's Doctor dissertation.
- Essays on the history of finances. (1913, in Russian) (Очерки по истории финансов)
- The Economic Policy of Soviet Russia. (London: P. S. King & Son, Limited, 1930. vii, 190 p. 1st ed.)
- The sales tax in Soviet Russia. (The tax magazine, Jan 1936)
- The public finance of the Union of Soviet Socialist Republics. ("The tax magazine", 1938)
- Recent changes in the Soviet tax system. (The tax magazine, Nov 1941)

== Bibliography ==
- A. Andreev; D. Tsygankov (2010). Imperial Moscow University: 1755-1917: encyclopedic dictionary. Moscow: Russian political encyclopedia (ROSSPEN). pp. 148–149. ISBN 978-5-8243-1429-8.
