= Attila Pavlath =

American chemist (1930–2019)

- Born: March 11, 1930; Budapest, Hungary
- Died: November 22, 2024 (aged 94); Atlanta, Georgia
- Occupation: University Professor
- Awards: Charles Lathrop Parsons Award (2019)
- Scientific career
- Fields: Chemistry

Attila Endre Pavlath (March 11, 1930 – November 22, 2024) was a Hungarian-American chemist. He served as president of the American Chemical Society.

== Life ==
He was born on March 11, 1930 in Budapest.

He married and had two children: Grace and George.

He died on November 22, 2024 in Atlanta.

== Education ==
He completed his diploma in chemical engineering at the Technical University of Budapest.

He earned his PhD in chemistry from the Hungarian Academy of Sciences.

== Career ==
=== Academic ===
He accepted a research fellow position at McGill University in 1956.

He was a member of the Royal Society of Great Britain.

=== Practical ===
He served as senior emeritus scientist at the U.S. Department of Agriculture (USDA).

In 1958, he joined Stauffer Chemical Company of California where he led a research group on agricultural problems.

He served as president of the American Chemical Society.

== Recognition ==
- Charles Lathrop Parsons Award of American Chemical Society (2019)
- Kenneth A. Spencer Award for Outstanding Achievement in Agricultural and Food Chemistry from the ACS Kansas City Section (2013).

== Bibliography ==
He has published more than 130 research papers, he has authored 10 books and several chapters, and he also holds 25 patents.
