= Bruce E. Bursten =

Past President of the American Chemical Society

- Born: March 8, 1954 (age 72); Chicago, Illinois
- Occupation: Provost
- Board member of: president of the American Chemical Society, AAAS Chemistry Chair
- Awards: ACS fellow

Academic background
- Education: University of Chicago; University of Wisconsin–Madison
- Doctoral advisor: Richard F. Fenske

Academic work
- Discipline: Chemistry
- Sub-discipline: Inorganic chemistry
- Institutions: The Ohio State University, University of Tennessee, Knoxville, Barnard College, Worcester Polytechnic Institute

Bruce Edward Bursten (March 8, 1954) is an American chemist, professor of chemistry, and was president of the American Chemical Society. He was the provost of Worcester Polytechnic Institute between 2016 and 2021. His research has specialised in inorganic chemistry and metal-containing molecules.

== Life ==
He was born in Chicago, Illinois. He graduated from University of Chicago, and University of Wisconsin-Madison, where he studied with Richard F. Fenske. He was a postdoc fellow with F. A. Cotton at Texas A&M University.

He taught at Ohio State University, University of Tennessee, Knoxville, and Barnard College. He was AAAS Chemistry Chair and an ACS fellow.

== Sources ==
- American men & women of science: a biographical directory of today's leaders in physical, biological and related sciences. Vol. 1. Bowker. 1989. p. 965. ISBN 9780835225687.
