= Roger Williams (chemist) =

American industrial chemist

- Born: Roger Williams; 27 July 1890; Pottsville, Pennsylvania
- Died: 23 February 1978, (aged 87); Doylestown, Pennsylvania
- Occupation: chemist
- Years active: 1918–1955
- Spouse: Caddy Jennings Williams m1915-1954, her death

Roger Williams (27 July 1890 – 23 February 1978) was an American industrial chemist and senior executive at E. I. du Pont de Nemours & Co. (DuPont). He is best known for directing DuPont's role in the Manhattan Project, overseeing construction and operations at the Hanford Engineer Works, and for receiving the 1955 Perkin Medal, the highest honor in U.S. industrial chemistry.

== Early life and education ==
Roger Williams was born in 1890 in Pottsville, Pennsylvania. He graduated from Brown University in 1914 and did graduate work in chemistry at MIT. Shortly thereafter, Williams joined DuPont, beginning a career that would span several decades.

== Career at DuPont ==
Williams advanced through DuPont's chemical divisions, including work in explosives, ammonia production, and industrial chemical development. By the early 1940s, he had become assistant general manager of DuPont's Explosives Department and a member of the company's executive committee.

== Role in the Manhattan Project ==
During World War II, the U.S. Army selected DuPont to design, build, and operate the plutonium production facilities at the Hanford Engineer Works in Washington State. Williams was appointed to lead this effort, creating the TNX Division within DuPont's Explosives Department to manage the project.

He organized TNX into two subdivisions:

- Technical Division – headed by Crawford Greenewalt, which collaborated with the Metallurgical Laboratory on reactor and plant design.
- Manufacturing Division – headed by R. Monte Evans, responsible for plant construction and operations.

Williams also directed the design of an air-cooled graphite pilot reactor before scaling up to full production reactors, a decision intended to mitigate corrosion and cooling-system reliability risks. Colleagues later credited his organizational skills and modest leadership style as critical to Hanford's success.

== Later career and Perkin Medal ==
After the war, Williams resumed corporate leadership at DuPont, contributing to the company's post-war expansion into synthetic materials, industrial chemicals, and agricultural products. In October 1954, he was named the recipient of the Perkin Medal of the American Section of the Society of Chemical Industry, which was presented to him in January 1955 for his “contributions to many phases of industrial chemical development.”

== Personal life ==
Williams was based for most of his career in Wilmington, Delaware, where he participated in professional societies and community affairs. Colleagues described him as an intense, detail-oriented scientist and a chain smoker.

== Death and legacy ==
Roger Williams died in 1978. His leadership in managing the Hanford plutonium facilities and his industrial chemistry achievements at DuPont remain recognized as key contributions to both the chemical industry and U.S. wartime history.

== See also ==
- Hanford Engineer Works
- Perkin Medal
- Manhattan Project
- Crawford Greenewalt
