= Hanford Engineer Works =

Former American nuclear production complex

Coordinates: 46°38′51″N 119°35′55″W

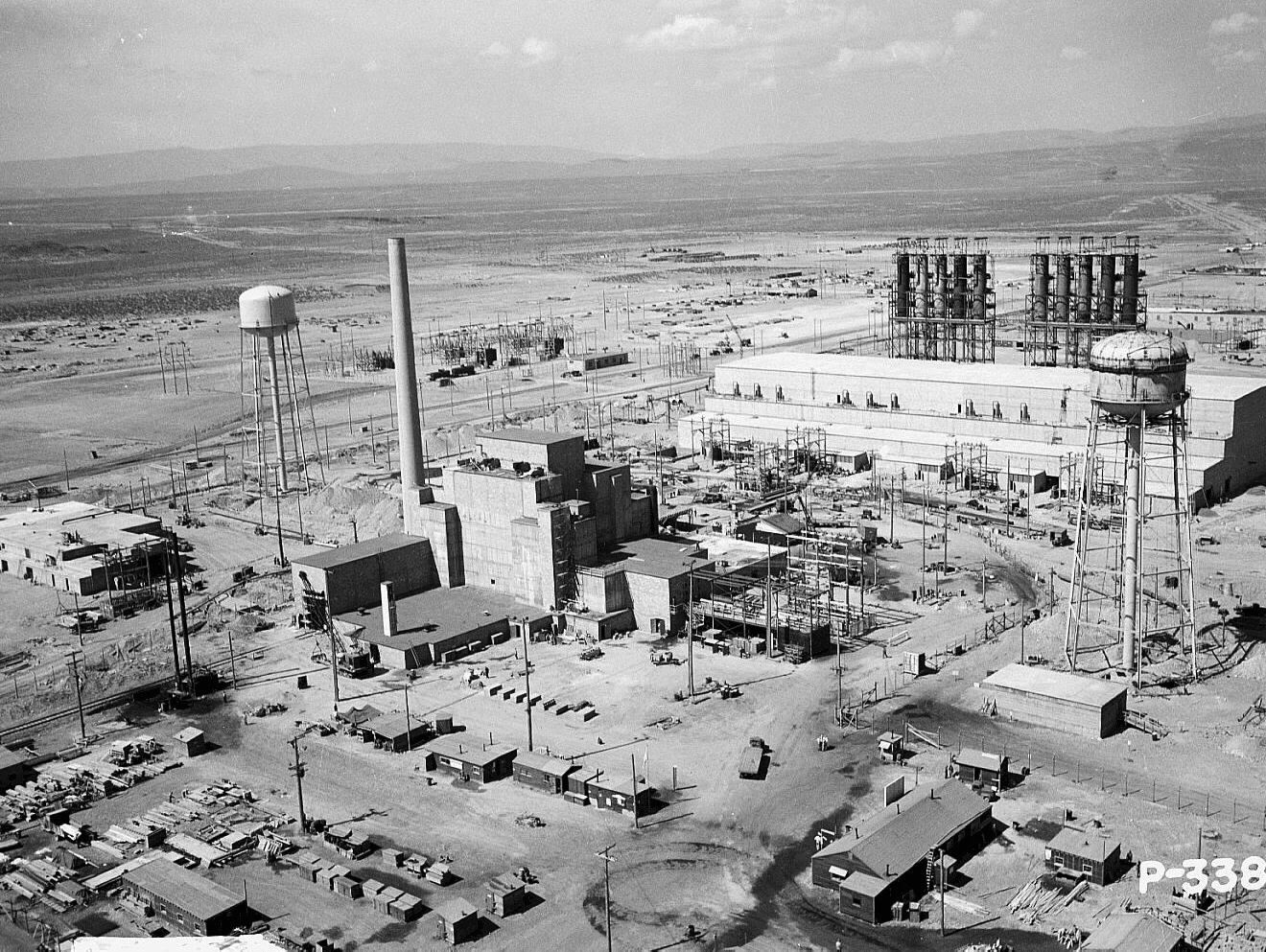
B Reactor and water treatment area in 1944

The Hanford Engineer Works (HEW) was a nuclear production complex in Benton County, Washington, established by the United States federal government in 1943 as part of the Manhattan Project during World War II. It built and operated the B Reactor, the first full-scale plutonium production reactor. Plutonium manufactured at the HEW was used in the atomic bomb detonated in the Trinity test in July 1945, and in the Fat Man bomb used in the atomic bombing of Nagasaki in August 1945. The plant continued producing plutonium for nuclear weapons until 1971. The HEW was commanded by Colonel Franklin T. Matthias until January 1946, and then by Colonel Frederick J. Clarke.

The director of the Manhattan Project, Brigadier General Leslie R. Groves Jr., engaged DuPont as the prime contractor for the design, construction and operation of the HEW. DuPont recommended that it be located far from densely populated areas, and a site on the Columbia River, codenamed Site W, was chosen. The federal government acquired the land under its war powers authority and relocated some 1,500 nearby residents. The acquisition was one of the largest in US history. Disputes arose with farmers over the value of the land and compensation for crops that had already been planted. The acquisition was not completed before the Manhattan Project ended in December 1946.

Construction commenced in March 1943 on a massive and technically challenging project. Most of the construction workforce, which reached a peak of nearly 45,000 in June 1944, lived in a temporary construction camp near the old Hanford townsite. Administrators, engineers and operating personnel lived in the government town established at Richland, which had a wartime peak population of 17,000. The HEW erected 554 buildings, including three graphite-moderated and water-cooled reactors (B, D and F) that operated at 250 megawatts. Natural uranium sealed in aluminum cans (known as "slugs") was fed into them.

B Reactor went critical in September 1944 and, after overcoming neutron poisoning, produced its first plutonium in November. Irradiated slugs were processed in two huge, remotely operated chemical separation plants (T and B) where the plutonium was extracted using the bismuth-phosphate process. Radioactive wastes were stored in underground tanks. The first batch of plutonium was processed in the T plant between December 1944 and February 1945 and delivered to the Manhattan Project's Los Alamos Laboratory. The identical D and F reactors came online in December 1944 and February 1945, respectively. The HEW suffered an outage on 10 March 1945 when a Japanese balloon bomb struck a high-tension power line. The total cost of the HEW up to December 1946 was over $348 million (equivalent to $4.4 billion in 2025).

The Manhattan Project ended on 31 December 1946 and control of the HEW passed from the Manhattan District to the Atomic Energy Commission.

== Contractor selection ==
During World War II, the S-1 Section of the federal Office of Scientific Research and Development (OSRD) sponsored a research project on plutonium by scientists at Columbia University, Princeton University, the University of Chicago and the University of California at Berkeley. Plutonium, a synthetic element only recently produced in laboratories, was theorized to be fissile and therefore usable in an atomic bomb. Metallurgical Laboratory physicists in Chicago designed nuclear reactors ("piles") that could transmute uranium into plutonium, while its chemists investigated ways to separate the plutonium from untransmuted uranium and fission products. Approximately four tonnes of uranium was required to produce one kilogram of plutonium. The plutonium program became known as the X-10 project.

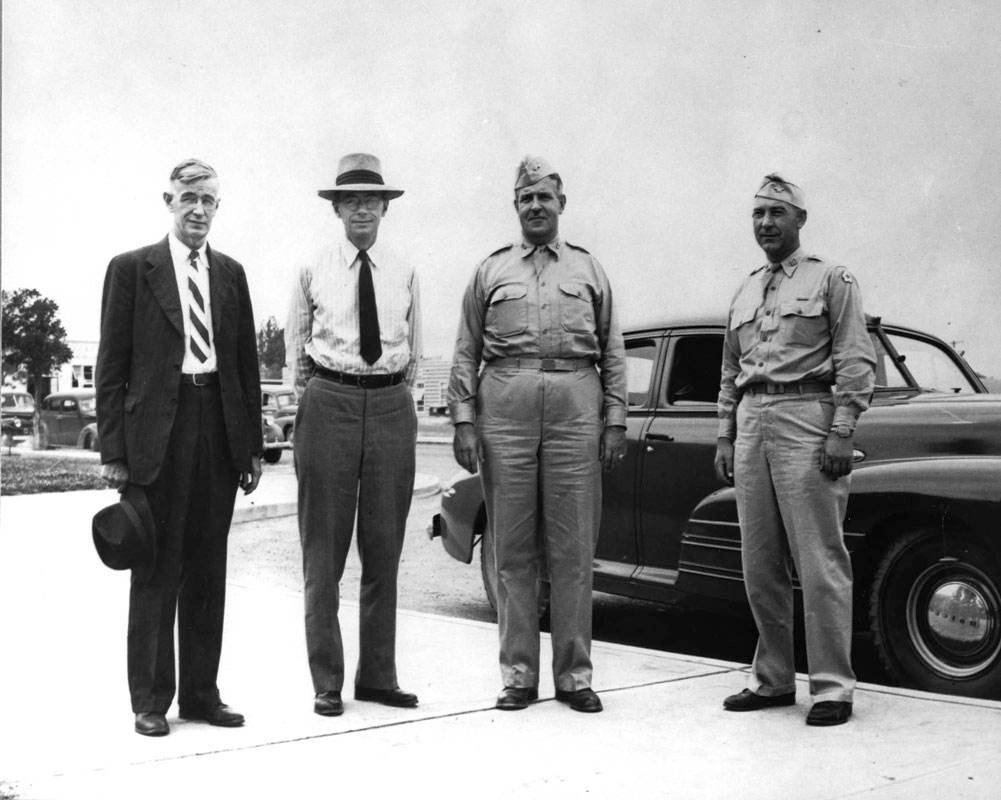
Vannevar Bush, James B. Conant, Leslie Groves and Franklin Matthias at the Hanford Engineer Works in June 1945

On 23 September 1942, Brigadier General Leslie R. Groves Jr. became the director of the Manhattan Project. Stone & Webster had been engaged to carry out the construction of the Clinton Engineer Works in Oak Ridge, Tennessee, but Groves considered the task of designing, building, and operating the Manhattan Project's facilities to be beyond the resources of a single firm. At the same time, he wanted to keep the number of major contractors down for security reasons.

Groves was attracted to DuPont, a firm he had worked with in the past, because it designed and built its own plants, suggesting it had the expertise to act as prime contractor for the plutonium production complex. This had the added benefit of not requiring the Manhattan District (the military component of the Manhattan Project) to coordinate the work of contractors on the project, thereby reducing Groves's workload. Groves briefed DuPont vice president Willis F. Harrington and chemist Charles Stine on the Manhattan Project on 31 October. They both protested that the company "had no experience or knowledge of physics and that they were incompetent to render any opinion except that the entire project seemed beyond human capability."

On 4 November, DuPont chemists and engineers – including Stine, Elmer Bolton, Roger Williams, Thomas H. Chilton and Crawford Greenewalt – visited the Metallurgical Laboratory in Chicago. On 10 November, Groves, Colonel Kenneth Nichols (the deputy chief engineer of the Manhattan District who was responsible for the HEW, the Clinton Engineer Works, and other production sites), Arthur H. Compton (the director of the Metallurgical Laboratory) and Norman Hilberry (Compton's deputy) met with DuPont's executive committee at the company headquarters in Wilmington, Delaware. Groves assured DuPont's president, Walter S. Carpenter Jr., that the Manhattan Project was considered of the greatest importance by President Franklin Roosevelt, Secretary of War Henry L. Stimson, and the Chief of Staff of the United States Army George C. Marshall.

Mindful of having been denounced as a merchant of death after World War I, DuPont initially refused payment, but for legal reasons a cost-plus contract was agreed upon, with the fee of one dollar. At Carpenter's request, OSRD Director Vannevar Bush had Roosevelt initial a letter noting that the government assumed all responsibility for all hazards involved in the project.

== Site selection ==
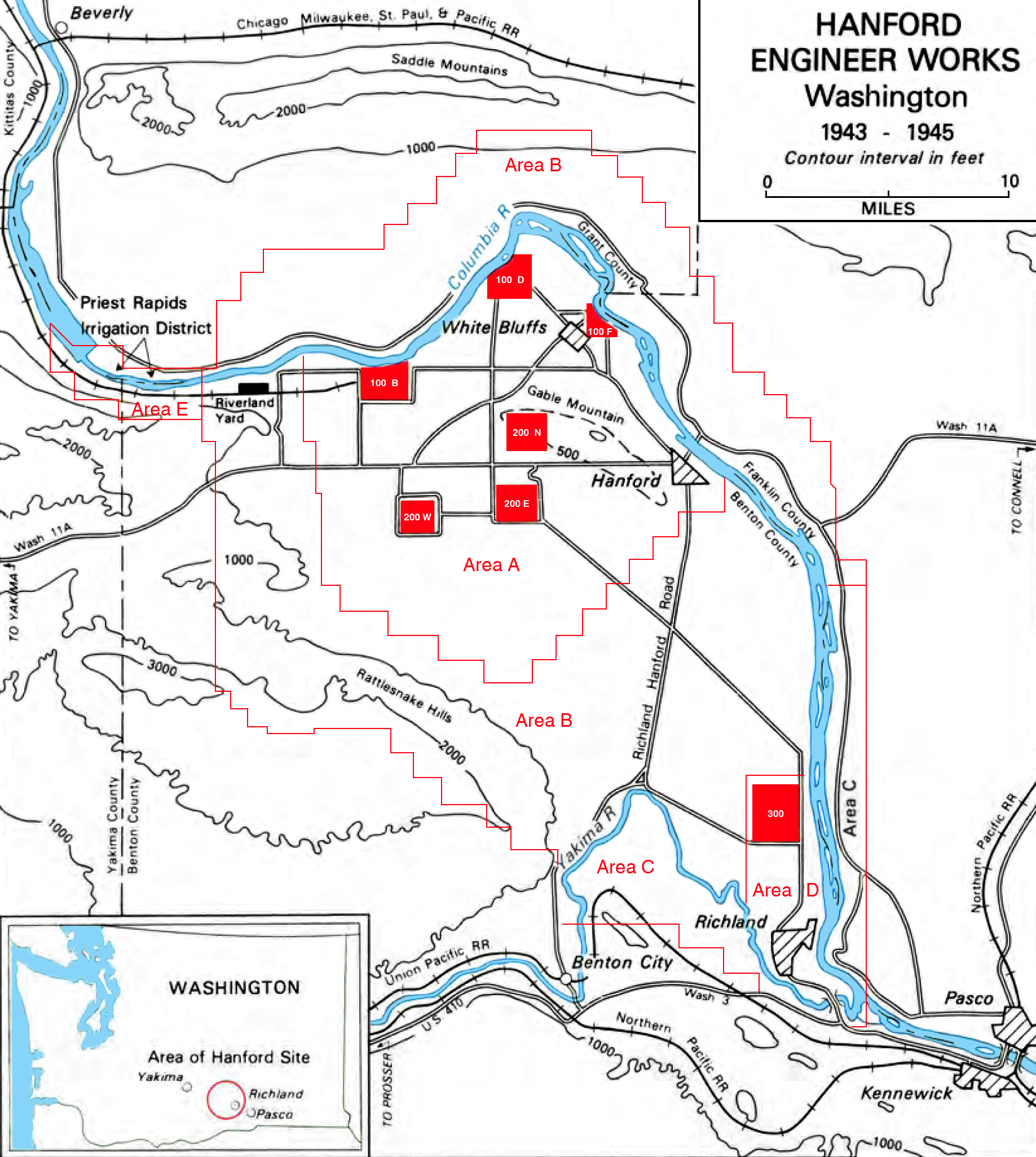
Map of the Hanford Site

It had originally been intended that the reactors be built at the Oak Ridge site, but Carpenter expressed reservations about this, because Oak Ridge was only 20 miles (32 km) from Knoxville. Physicists at the Metallurgical Laboratory were more sanguine about the safety of nuclear reactors; Eugene Wigner claimed they could be built on the Potomac River near Washington, DC. A major accident might result in loss of life and severe health effects, and Groves was concerned that even a minor one could disrupt vital war production – particularly of aluminum – or require evacuation of the Manhattan Project's isotope separation plants. But spreading the Oak Ridge facilities over a larger area would involve the purchase of more land. In December 1942, the number of reactors that needed to be built was still uncertain; for planning purposes it was intended to build six reactors and four chemical separation plants.

The ideal site was described by eight criteria:

1. A clean and abundant water supply (at least 25,000 US gallons per minute (1,600 L/s))
2. A large electric power supply (about 100,000 kW)
3. A "hazardous manufacturing area" of at least 12 by 16 miles (19 by 26 km)
4. Space for laboratory facilities at least 8 miles (13 km) from the nearest reactor or separations plant
5. The employees' village no less than 10 miles (16 km) upwind of the plant
6. No towns of more than a thousand people closer than 20 miles (32 km) from the hazardous manufacturing area
7. No main highway, railway, or employee village closer than 10 miles (16 km) from the hazardous manufacturing area
8. Ground that could bear heavy loads.

The most important of these criteria was the availability of electric power. The needs of war industries had created power shortages in many parts of the country, and using the Tennessee Valley Authority was ruled out because the Clinton Engineer Works was expected to absorb its excess generating capacity. Between 18 and 31 December 1942 (just twelve days after the Metallurgical Laboratory team led by Enrico Fermi started up Chicago Pile-1, the first nuclear reactor) a survey party consisting of Lieutenant Colonel Franklin T. Matthias and DuPont engineers A. E. S. Hall and Gilbert P. Church inspected several alternative sites.

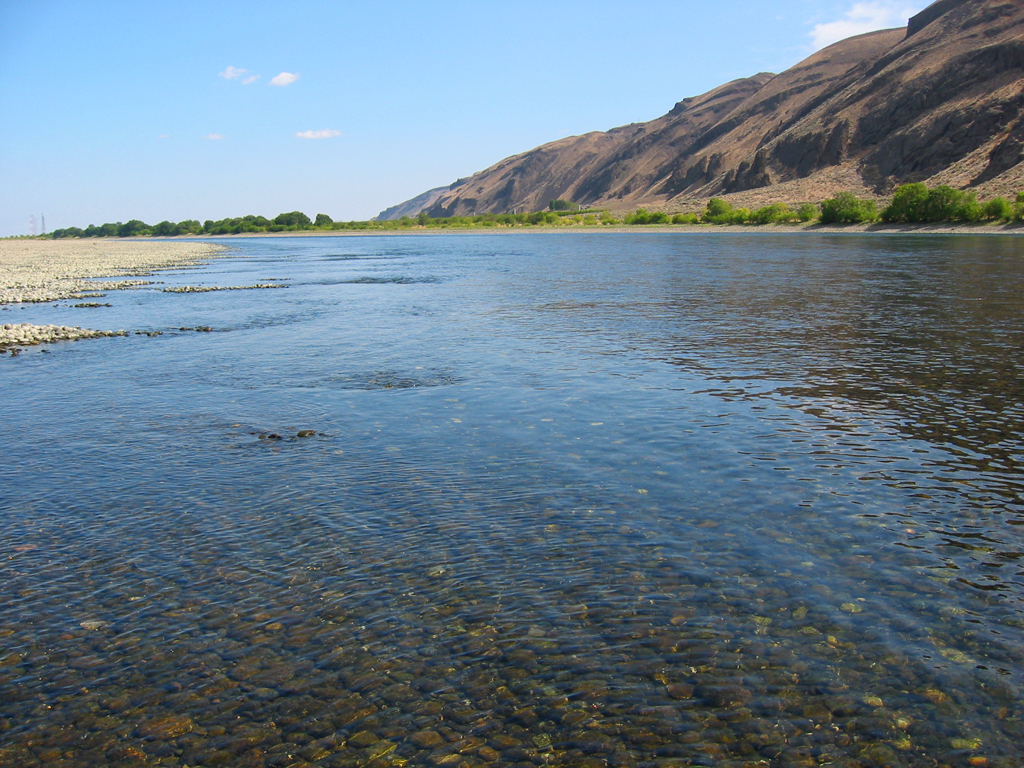
The Columbia River at the Hanford Reach

They looked at sites near Coeur d'Alene, Idaho; Hanford, Washington; Mansfield, Washington; the Deschutes River and John Day River Valleys in Oregon; the Pit River in California; Blythe, California; and Needles, California (the last two being on the Colorado River). On 1 January 1943, Matthias called Groves from Portland, Oregon, and reported that the Hanford Site was "far more favorable in virtually all respects than any other". The survey party noted an abundance of aggregate, which could be used to make concrete, and that the ground appeared firm enough to support massive structures. They noted that a high-voltage power line connecting Grand Coulee Dam to Bonneville Dam traversed the site. Groves visited it on 16 January 1943, and approved the selection. It was officially designated the Hanford Engineer Works (HEW), and codenamed "Site W".

Matthias had worked with Groves on their previous project, the construction of the Pentagon. Groves intended for Matthias to become his deputy, but on the advice of the chief engineer of the Manhattan District, Colonel James C. Marshall, Matthias became the Hanford Site area engineer. Gilbert Church became the field project manager of DuPont's construction team. Part of the reason for sending them together on the survey party was to verify that they were compatible as coworkers. As area engineer, Matthias had an unusual degree of autonomy. Hanford's isolated location meant that communications were limited, so day-to-day reporting back to Manhattan District headquarters in Oak Ridge was impractical. The project enjoyed the War Production Board's AAA rating, giving it the highest priority for procurement of raw materials and supplies.

DuPont created a division within E. B. Yancey's explosives department under Roger Williams known as TNX. Williams divided it into two subdivisions: a Technical Division, headed by Greenewalt, to work with the Metallurgical Laboratory on design; and a Manufacturing Division under R. Monte Evans to supervise plant operations. Construction was the responsibility of DuPont's Engineering Department, whose head, E. G. Ackart, assigned responsibility for the plutonium project to his deputy Granville M. Read. Eventually, 90 percent of DuPont's engineering personnel and resources were devoted to the Manhattan Project.

== Land acquisition ==
Secretary Stimson authorized the acquisition of the land on 8 February 1943. A Manhattan District project office opened in Prosser, Washington, on 22 February. Federal judge Lewis B. Schwellenbach issued an order of possession under the Second War Powers Act the following day, and the first tract was acquired on 10 March. Notices went out in March to residents of White Bluffs, Hanford and Richland, about 1,500 people in all. The army dug up 177 graves at the White Bluffs Cemetery, and moved them to Prosser, on the other side of Rattlesnake Mountain.

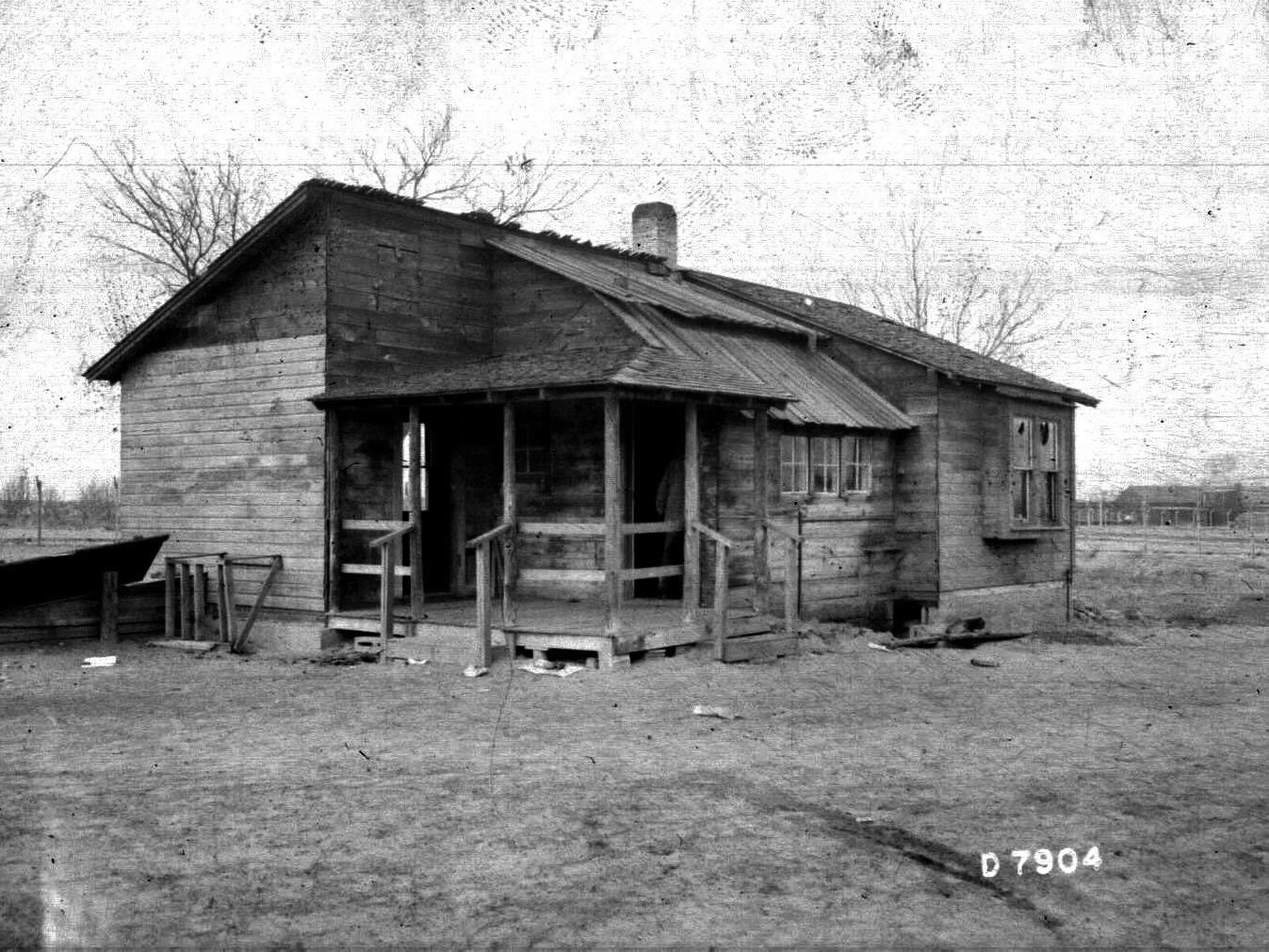
Abandoned Hanford farmhouse post-acquisition

The land was divided into five areas. Area A, at the center of the site, was the location of the project facilities; it was acquired outright, and for safety and security reasons all non-project personnel would be removed. Surrounding Area A was a safety zone, Area B; this land was leased, with its occupants subject to eviction at short notice. Area C was earmarked for the workers' village and was leased or purchased. Area D was earmarked for production plants and was purchased. Finally there were two parcels of land designated as Area E, that were to be acquired only if necessary. Ultimately, 6,599.45 acres (2,670.70 ha) of Area E was acquired by lease, fee or transfer. In all, 4,218 tracts totaling 428,203.65 acres (173,287.87 ha) were to be acquired, making it one of the largest land acquisition projects in American history.

Some 88 percent of this land was sagebrush, where eighteen to twenty thousand sheep grazed. Almost all the rest was farmland, although not all was under cultivation. Farmers felt that they should be compensated for the value of crops under cultivation as well as their land. Most of the appraisers from the Federal Land Bank were based in Seattle or Portland, and were unfamiliar with the region's crops and farming practices. They visited in winter when many fields looked fallow and farmers were absent for the season, often working in the shipyards in Seattle, or serving in the military, but did not consider their land to be abandoned. There had been few land sales in the area for comparison, and prices were poor during the Great Depression. The values assigned to the farms therefore tended to be quite low.

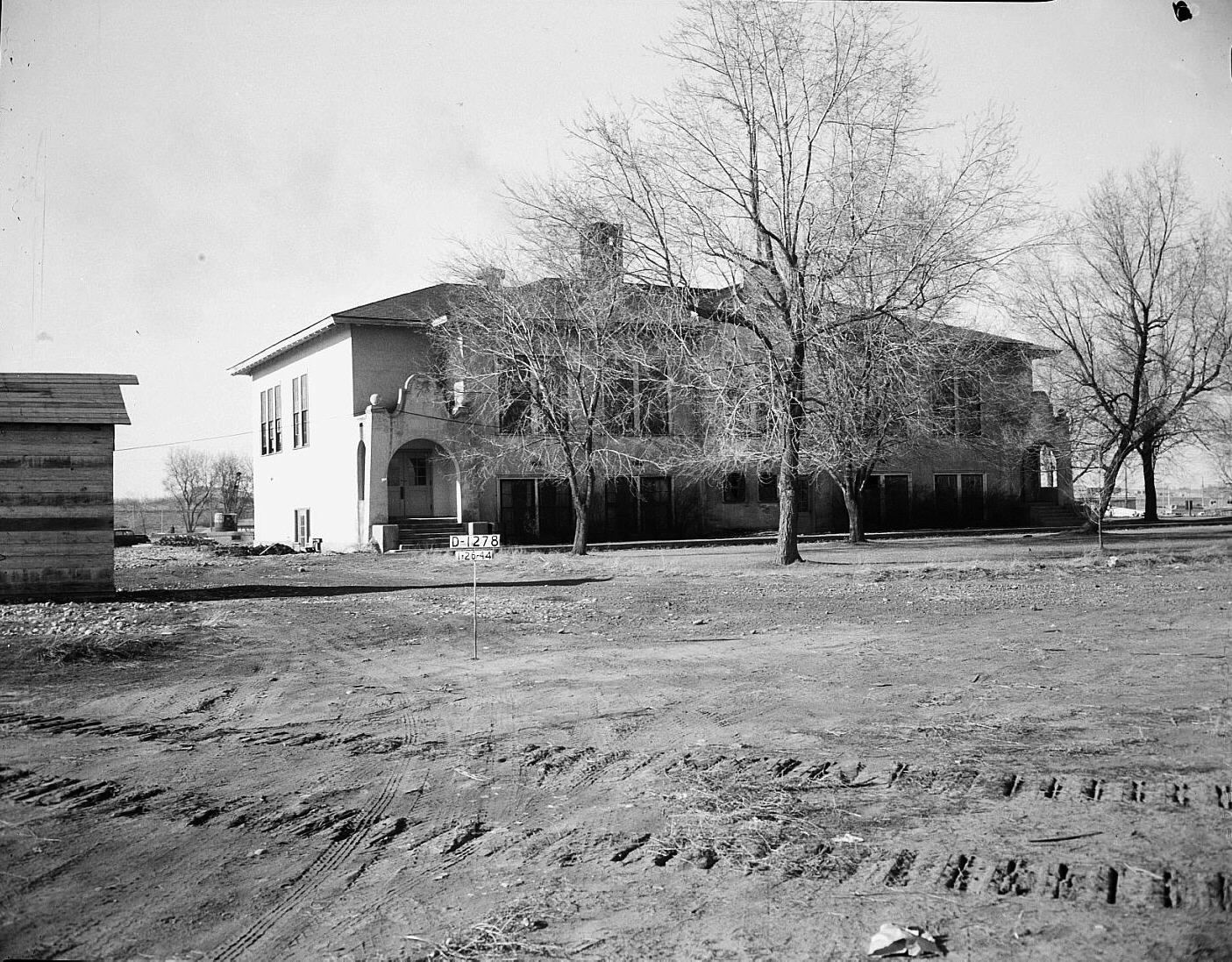
Richland High School

Since work on the site could not commence immediately, Groves postponed taking physical possession of land under cultivation so that crops already planted could be harvested. Harvest dates ranged from April through September, depending on the type of crop, but when the residents came to be seen as a security hazard, an order was issued on 5 July expelling them with two days' notice.

The harvest in the summer and fall of 1943 was exceptionally bountiful, and prices were high due to the war. This increased land prices. It also promoted exaggerated ideas about the value of the land, leading to litigation. A particular problem was the irrigation districts, which provided a nucleus for organized opposition to the acquisition, and hired legal counsel. The farmers had to pay for their share of irrigation district land from the sale of their property. An appraisal on 7 August confirmed that the bonds were adequately covered but until then many farmers refused to sell. The biggest grievance was slow payment. On 18 June 1943, Matthias noted that only nineteen checks had been delivered for the two thousand completed transactions.

Land acquisition by previous utilization
Classification	Tracts	Acres	Hectares
Town plots	496	679.71	275.07
Farmland	1,008	48,956.05	19,811.81
Grazing land	1,589	377,468.19	152,755.96
Miscellaneous	125	1,099.70	445.03
Total	3,218	428,203.65	173,287.87

Discontent over the acquisition was apparent in letters from Hanford Site residents to the War and Justice Departments. Bush briefed Roosevelt on the acquisition but the Truman Committee began making inquiries. On 15 June, it sent letters to Carpenter and Julius H. Amberg, Stimson's special assistant, seeking an explanation for the choice of the location, the estimated cost of the project, and the need for the acquisition of so much land. At a cabinet meeting on 17 June, Roosevelt asked Stimson whether the Manhattan Project would consider moving plutonium production elsewhere. Groves reassured Stimson that there was no other site "where the work could be done so well". Stimson then went to see Senator Harry S. Truman, who agreed to remove the Hanford Site from the committee's investigations on the grounds of national security. Despite Stimson's attempts to keep all knowledge of its purpose from Truman, the latter wrote to a Spokane judge in July about the site: "I know something about that tremendous real estate deal, and I have been informed that it is for the construction of a plant to make a terrific explosion for a secret weapon that will be a wonder." In December, an investigator from the Truman Committee once again attempted to probe the Hanford project because of "various rumors" that another Senator had sent to Truman, and March 1944, the Committee again needed reassurance that the project was secret and could not be audited.

Between March and October 1943, settlements averaged 108 per month. The first condemnation trial began on 7 October. Trial juries were largely drawn from Yakima, where land productivity and prices were much higher, and they distrusted the Federal Land Bank appraisers. Under the usual procedure in Washington state, they visited the tracts under adjudication, and the sight of workers with DuPont identification badges generated rumors that the project had no military value and the government was using eminent domain for the benefit of private enterprise. The juries were sympathetic to the claims of the landowners and the payments awarded were well in excess of the appraisals.

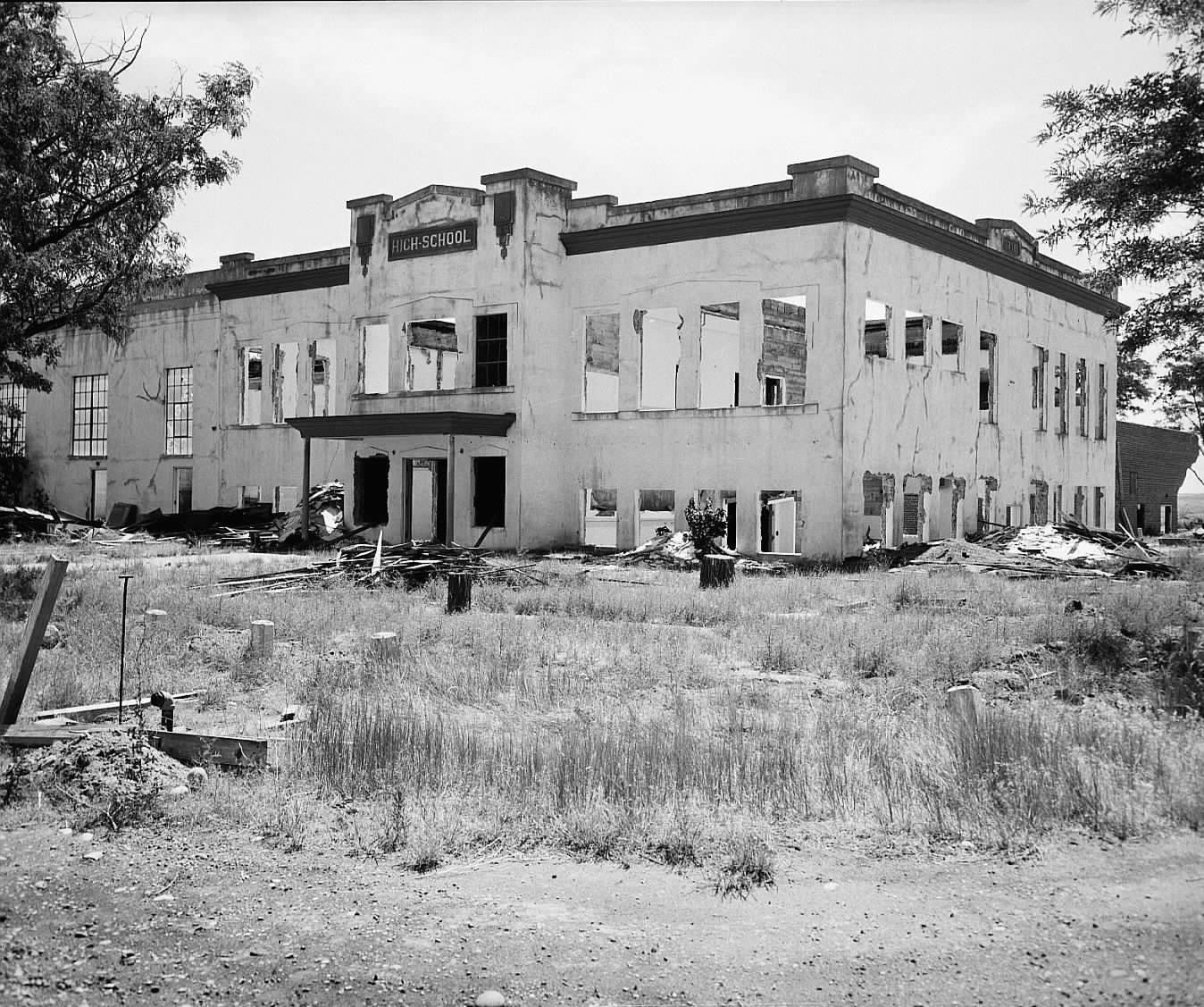
Old Hanford High School in 1954

From October 1943 until April 1944, the rate of settlements dropped to an average of seven per month. Groves became concerned that public attention generated by the trials and the inspection of tracts by juries where construction was now commencing might jeopardize project security. He arranged with Norman M. Littell, the assistant attorney general in charge of the Lands Division at the Justice Department, for additional flexibility in making adjustments to valuations to facilitate out of court settlement, and for the establishment of a second court with additional judges. Air conditioning was installed in the courtroom in Yakima to permit cases to be heard during the summer months.

Littell became convinced that the root of the problem was faulty appraisals, and on 13 October 1944, he appeared at the court in Yakima and asked Schwellenbach to put all condemnation trials on hold until the Justice Department could carry out reappraisals of more than 700 tracts still awaiting settlement. The Under Secretary of War, Robert P. Patterson sent a strongly worded letter to Attorney General Francis Biddle. This brought to a head a long-standing dispute between Biddle and Littell over the administration of the Lands Division, and Biddle asked for Littell's resignation. When this was not forthcoming, he had Roosevelt remove Littell from office on 26 November. When the Manhattan Project ended on 31 December 1946, there were still 237 tracts remaining to be settled. In all, $5,148,462 (equivalent to $65,000,000 in 2025) was spent on land acquisition.

Also affected were the Wanapum people, the Confederated Tribes and Bands of the Yakima Nation, the Confederated Tribes of the Umatilla Indian Reservation, and the Nez Perce Tribe. Native Americans were accustomed to fishing in the Columbia River near White Bluffs for two or three weeks in October. The fish they caught was dried and provided food for the winter. A deal was struck with Wanapum Chief Johnny Buck allowing Buck and his two assistants to issue passes to fish at the site. This authority was revoked in 1944 for security reasons. The Yakima rejected offers of an annual cash payment, and Matthias provided a truck and a driver to take them to Priest Rapids each day during the fishing season but they were not permitted to camp there overnight. Matthias gave assurances to the Native Americans that their graves would be treated with respect, but it would be fifteen years before the Wanapum were allowed access to mark the cemeteries. In 1997, tribal elders were permitted to bring children and young adults onto the site once a year to learn about their sacred sites.

== Township ==
=== Hanford ===
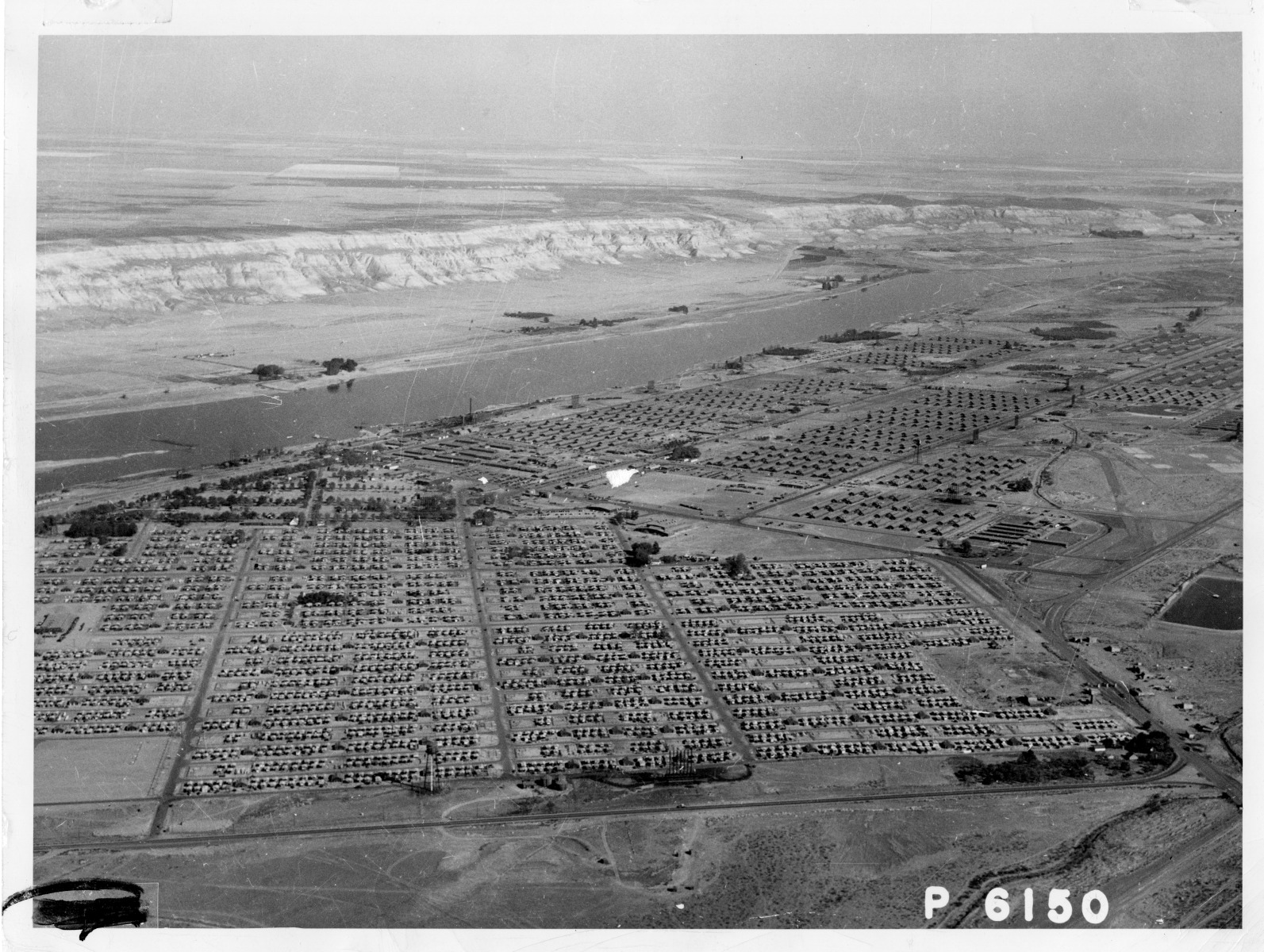
Aerial view of the Hanford construction camp

Matthias and Church met in Wilmington on 2 March 1943, and drew up an outline of the layout of the Hanford Engineer Works. Normally in an isolated area, employees would be accommodated on site, but in this case for security and safety reasons it was desirable to house them at least 10 miles (16 km) away. Even the construction workforce could not be housed on site, because some plant operation would have to be carried out during startup testing. The Army and DuPont engineers decided to create two communities: a temporary constructions camp and a more substantial operating village. Rather than create temporary construction camps at every building site, one large camp serviced all the building sites.

Construction was expedited by locating the construction camp and the operating village on the sites of existing villages, where they could take advantage of the buildings, roads and utility infrastructure already in place. The engineers decided to locate the temporary construction camp on the site of the village of Hanford, which had a population of about 125. It was 6 miles (9.7 km) from the nearest process area site, which was considered to be sufficiently distant at startup. It was served by the Connell–Yakima state highway, the Pasco–White Bluffs road, and a branch line of the Chicago, Milwaukee, St. Paul and Pacific Railroad. Electricity was available from the Pacific Power and Light Company substation, and water from local wells. Community facilities included stores, two fruit-packing warehouses, a stock yard, a combined grade and high school, and a church.

Since DuPont and the Metallurgical Laboratory had yet to make much progress on the design of the reactors or the processing plants, it was not known how many construction workers would be required to build them. Town planning proceeded on the assumption that construction would require 25,000 to 28,000 workers, half of whom would live in the camp, but DuPont designed the camp to permit expansion. This proved to be wise; nearly twice that number of workers would ultimately be required, and the capacity of surrounding communities to absorb workers was limited. Three types of accommodation were provided in the camp: barracks, hutments and trailer parking. The first workers to arrive lived in 125 US Army pyramidal tents with wooden floors and sides while they erected the first barracks. Two types of barracks were erected: two-wing barracks for women and four-wing for men. White and non-white people had separate barracks. Construction commenced on 6 April 1943 and eventually 195 were erected, the last of which were completed on 27 May 1944. There were 110 for white men, 21 for black men, 57 for white women and 7 for black women. Not all were used for accommodation, and one white-women wing was turned over to the Women's Army Corps. The barracks could hold 29,216 workers.

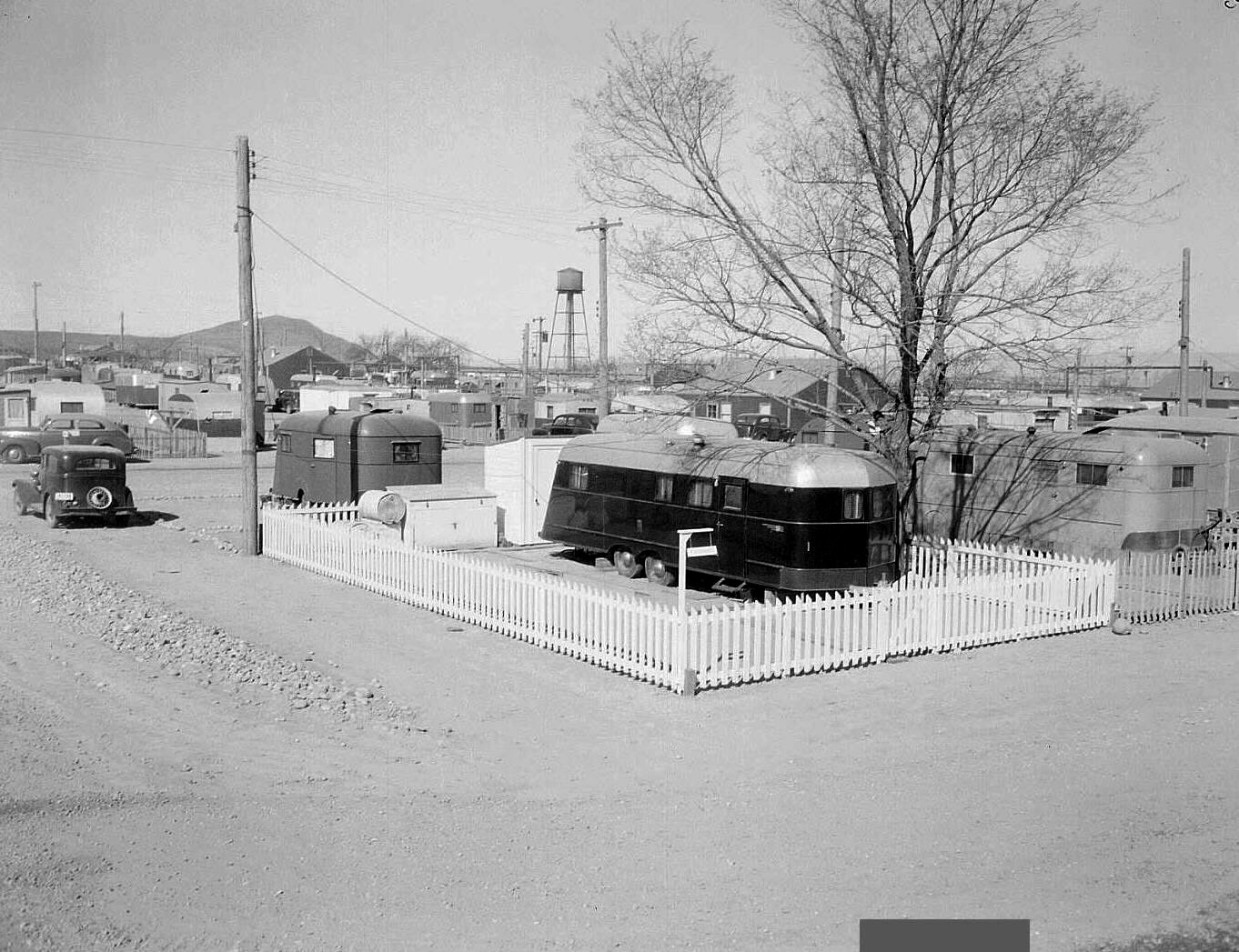
Hanford camp trailer park

As construction of the facilities got under way, Groves released construction workers working on barracks by purchasing hutments. These were simple, prefabricated plywood and Celotex dwellings capable of accommodating ten to twenty workers each. For heating, they had a wood- or coal-burning stove in each unit. In all, 820 double huts and 272 single huts were bought from the Pacific Huts company in Seattle. Erected between 27 February and 15 July 1944, they held 7,120 white men and 2,714 black men. Between them, the barracks and hutments held 39,050 workers. Many workers had their own trailers, taking their families with them from one wartime construction job to the next. Seven trailer camps were established, with 3,639 lots, of which all but 45 were occupied during the peak of construction work, and 12,008 people were living in them.

In addition to accommodation, the Hanford camp contained other buildings and facilities. Mess halls and recreation halls were operated by the Olympic Commissary Company under subcontract to DuPont. The original grocery and clothing stores remained in operation, and DuPont leased other stores, the number of which gradually expanded over time, to private operators. The Hanford camp contained two garages and service stations, a laundry, a bank, a post office and a bus station. There was a hospital, churches, a library, and police and fire stations. Before the Manhattan District arrived, the school had about 65 students. When the fall term commenced on 14 September 1943, it had 560 students and 18 teachers. In the 1943–1944 school year there were 1,891 students and 38 teachers. The school closed on 13 February 1945.

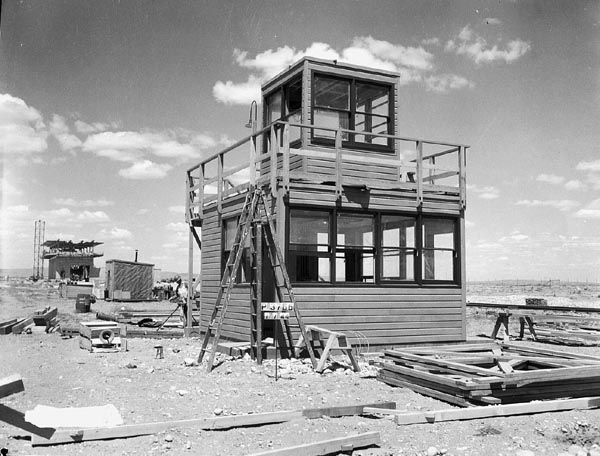
Hanford Airport control tower under construction

There was also an airport with a blacktop runway 30 feet (9.1 m) wide and 2,000 feet (610 m) long. When the camp expanded, the airport was moved to a new site about 1 mile (1.6 km) west of Hanford. The new airport had two runways, one aligned north-south and the other east-west. Both were 200 feet (61 m) wide, but the north-south runway was 4,000 feet (1,200 m) long and the east-west only 2,400 feet (730 m) long. This enabled the airport to handle Air Transport Command aircraft carrying air express shipments. The airport's buildings consisted of two hangars and a hutment, and there were electrical fuel pumps.

With the completion of construction in February 1945, the camp population rapidly decreased in size. Administrative and service offices were relocated to Richland. For security and safety reasons, it was desirable to have non-operating personnel located outside the restricted area, so it was decided to demolish the Hanford construction camp, leaving only a residual camp for a thousand men in case emergency construction was required. The Area Engineer's office removed all electrical and mechanical equipment for re-use, but much of it was surplus to the needs of the Hanford Engineer Works and was either shipped to other Manhattan Project sites or disposed of. The demolition contract was awarded to the Mohawk Wrecking and Lumber Company of Detroit, which tendered the lowest bid of $103,005.30 (equivalent to $1,460,000 in 2025). Demolition commenced in January 1946 and was expected to take twelve months. A maximum of 363 workers were employed. Items salvaged included 23,000,000 board feet (54,000 m^{3}) of lumber, 157,000 feet (48,000 m) of wooden stave and 9,000 feet (2,700 m) of steel water pipe, 55,000 feet (17,000 m) of steel steam pipe and 6,500,000 square feet (600,000 m^{2}) of plasterboard. The total cost of the Hanford construction camp up to 31 December 1946 was $37,589,302 (equivalent to $473,000,000 in 2025).

=== Richland ===
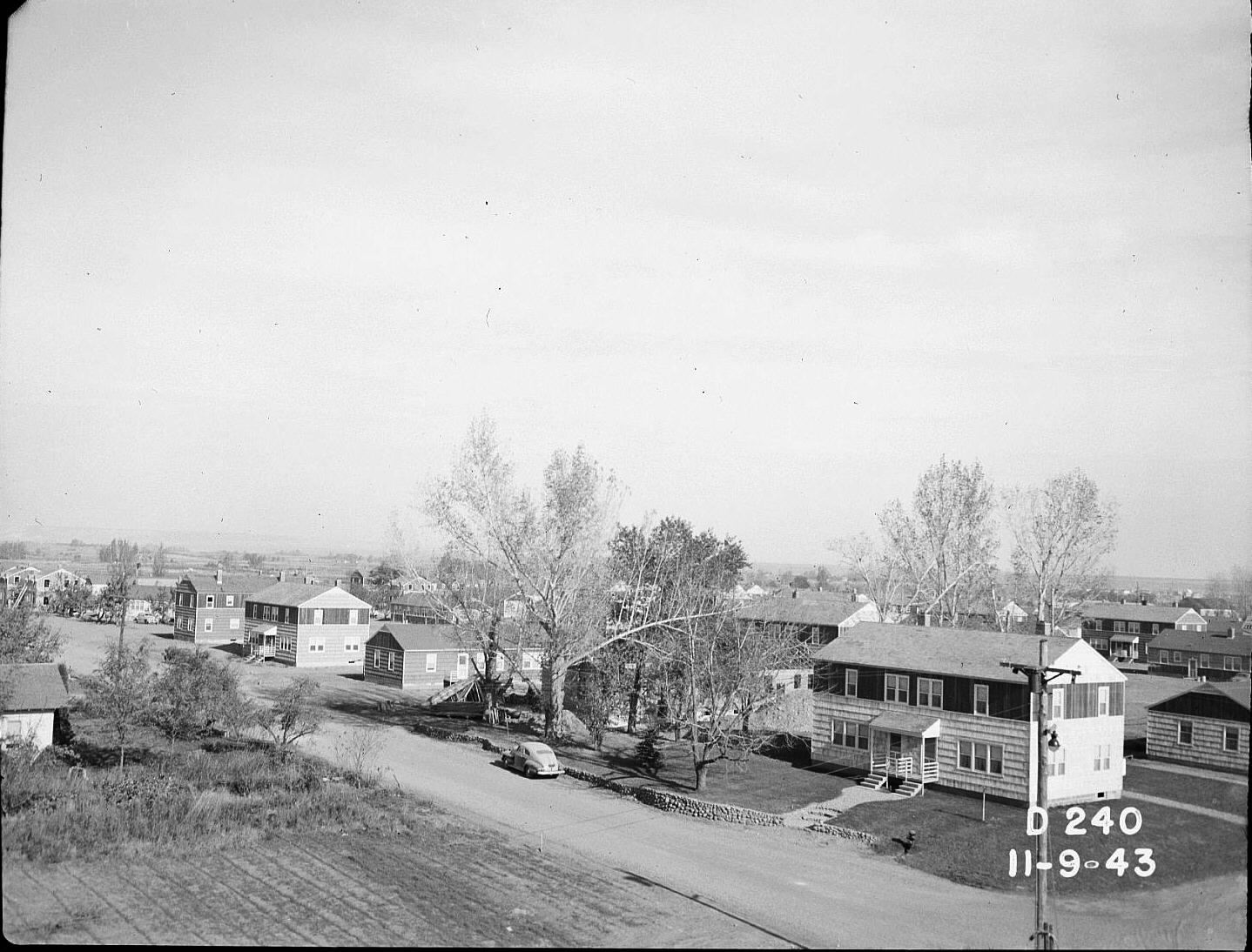
Richland housing area in September 1943

Richland was chosen as the site for the operating village. The project engineers also considered Benton City, Washington. It was more suitable, but was not part of the area initially acquired, and for security reasons it was desirable to have the operating village inside the restricted area. The Manhattan District could have acquired the area but given the opposition to the land acquisition already in progress, they decided to use Richland, which was already being acquired. Richland lay about 25 miles (40 km) from the reactor sites. The village had a population of about 250, but was surrounded by small farms, so the 2,500-acre (1,000 ha) site had a population of about 600. The citizens of Richland were given until 15 November 1943 to vacate their homes.

The plan called for a village of 6,500 people, expandable up to 7,500, based on the assumption that 30 to 40 percent of the operating employees would live in the surrounding communities. The inability of those communities to absorb the numbers soon became apparent, and in September 1943 the size of Richland was set at 16,000. DuPont put the contract for building the village out to tender, and the contract was awarded to the lowest bidder, G. Albin Pehrson, on 16 March 1943. Pehrson opened an office at Pasco High School. He produced a series of standard house designs based on the Cape Cod and ranch-style house design fashions of the day. While the Hanford construction camp had a grid layout, the residential areas of Richland had curved streets and cul-de-sacs. Existing shade and fruit trees were retained where possible. Unlike Oak Ridge and Los Alamos, Richland was not surrounded by a high wire fence. Because the town was open, Matthias asked DuPont to ensure that it was kept neat and tidy.

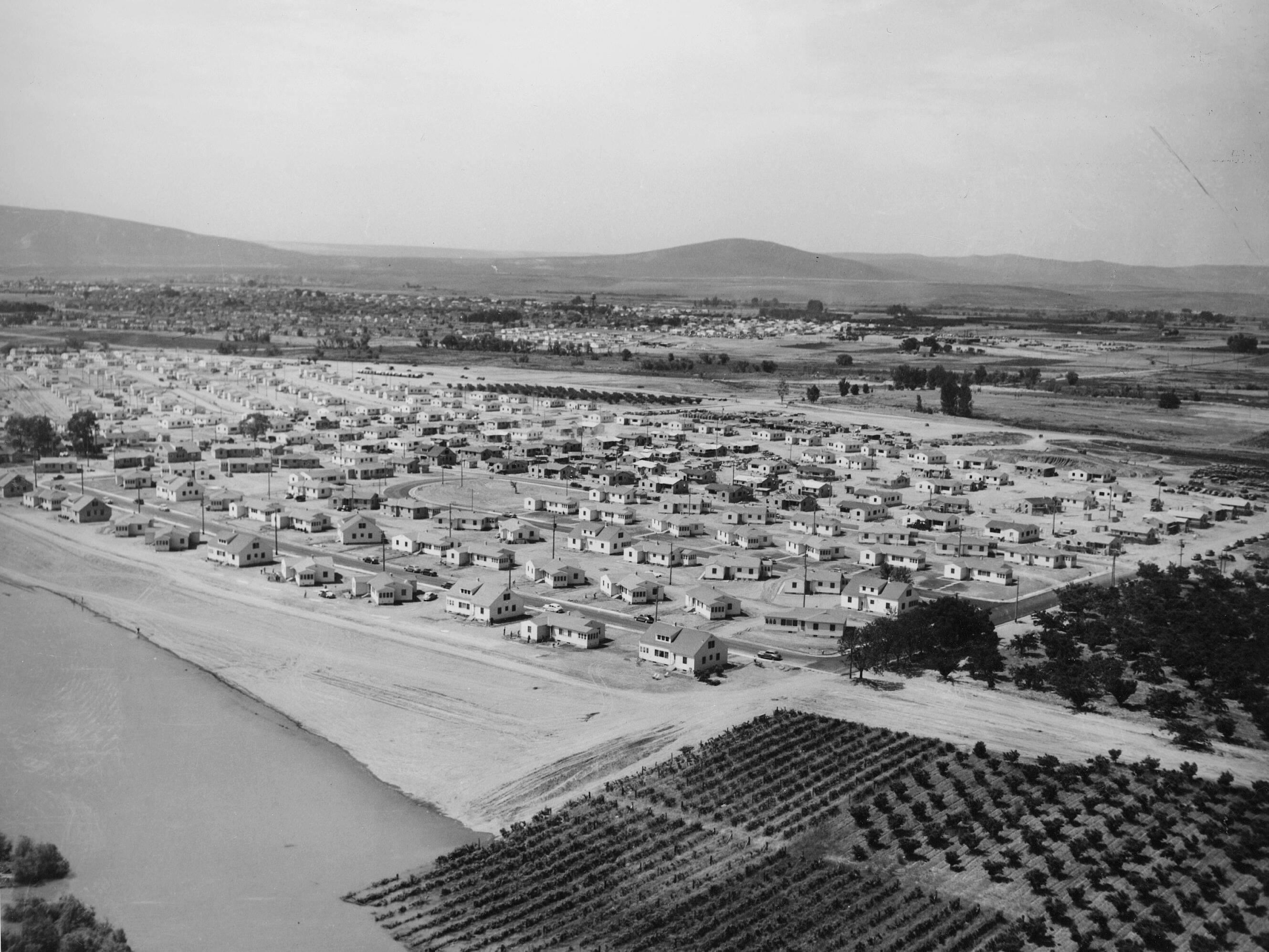
The town of Richland

Pehrson accepted the need for speed and efficiency, but his vision of a model late-20th century community differed from that of Groves. Groves was, for example, opposed to the stores having display windows, which he felt would encourage window shopping and impulse buying; he wanted them to look like the utilitarian post exchanges on Army posts. In this, and in many other things, Pehrson ultimately had his way, because DuPont was his customer, not the Army. The result was a compromise between his vision and that of Groves, although closer to the former than the latter. Groves wanted the houses to be clustered close together, so the residents could walk to amenities, but Pehrson gave them spacious lots, so cars and buses were required.

The initial list of commercial establishments included a shopping center, but only two food stores, each with 10,000 square feet (930 m^{2}) of retail space. As the town grew in size, Pehrson was able to convince Groves to allow more shops, but in each case he had to provide data demonstrating that the establishment in question was appropriate for a village the size of Richland. The resulting compromise would handicap Richland for many years with inadequate sidewalks, stores and shops, no civic center, and roads that were too narrow.

It was hoped that the existing commercial establishments could be reused, and they were permitted to continue to trade after the acquisition, but most were found to be too small or too poorly located. Several were converted to other uses. Most of the new commercial establishments were completed by 15 February 1945. It was likewise hoped that the existing dwellings could be re-used, but many were in poor shape, and renovating them would have cost more than building new houses. By February 1945, only 25 of the original dwellings, known as tract houses, were still in use.

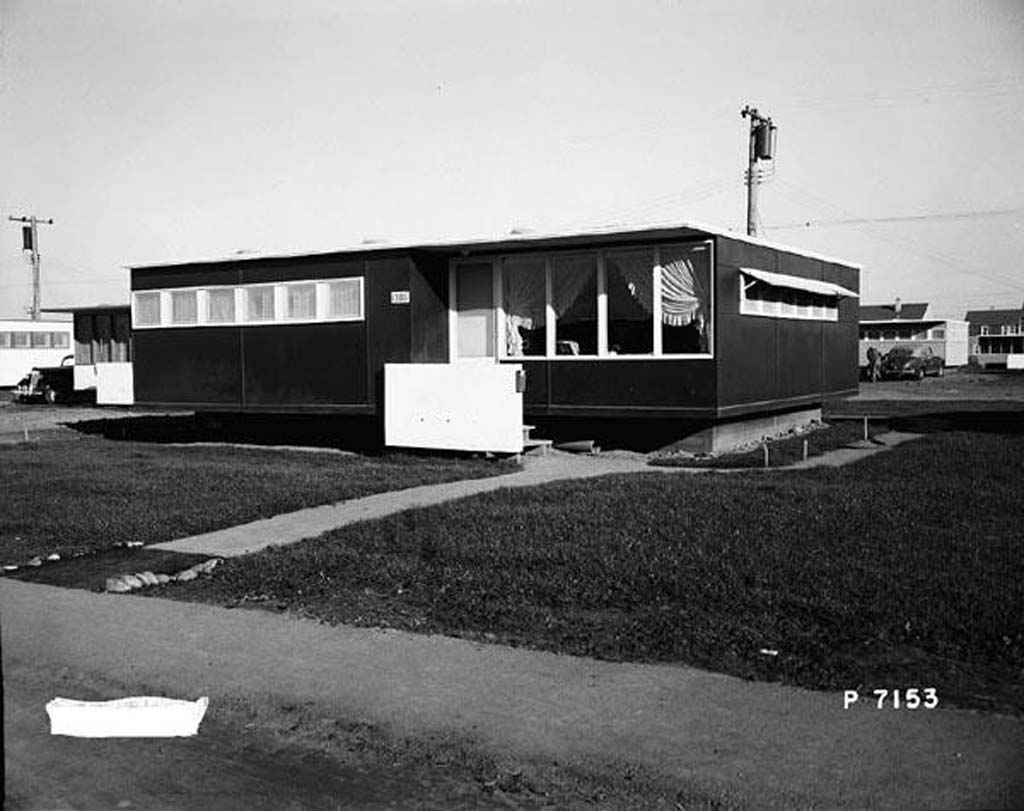
Prefabricated housing at Richland

Some 1,800 prefabricated houses were added to the plan. The company responsible for their manufacture, Prefabricated Engineering, did not have the equipment to transport them to Richland from its plant in Toledo, Oregon, so it hired a Chicago-based firm to do this. The subcontractor ran afoul of wartime regulations requiring the company to hire local drivers, and the International Brotherhood of Teamsters union, who cited safety issues. Matthias arranged for the prefabricated houses to be delivered by rail, which cost more. He negotiated a settlement with the union in April 1944, but the Office of Defense Transportation and the Interstate Commerce Commission were another matter, and Prefabricated Engineering was forced to hire a more expensive local firm. By the time the last of the prefabricated houses was ordered in May 1944, most of the available sites were gone, and prefabricated houses were clustered together on the western side of Richland.

Hiring a moving company to ship possessions was difficult in wartime, so the dwellings, including the prefabricated houses, were provided with basic furnishings, including a refrigerator, an electric stove, and an electric hot water system. Occupants paid monthly rentals of $27.50 (equivalent to $454 in 2025) to $80, depending on the size and type of the house. In addition to houses, there were eight dormitories for men and seventeen for women. The first nineteen built had single and double rooms, but the last six had only double rooms. These provided accommodation for up to 1,000 people. Dormitory residents paid from $15.00 (equivalent to $248 in 2025) to $22.50 per month.

Housing authorized in Richland
Class	1 BR	2 BR	3 BR	4 BR	Total
Prefabricated	400	800	600	-	1,800
$4,000	-	1,040	816	-	1,856
$6,000	-	-	500	-	500
$7,500	-	-	84	60	144
Total	400	1,840	2,000	60	4,300

Housing assignments were based on the employee's rank. At the time three-bedroom houses were considered a luxury, and Groves wanted two-bedroom houses; but DuPont argued that a quarter of the employees would be administrators or technical staff, who warranted larger homes. Groves was appalled at the idea of clustering houses of a certain value together, so that employees of a certain ranks would live in the same neighborhood. To Groves this was an overt assertion of social class in the United States, but DuPont had its way, and the best houses were built on the most desirable lots along the river front.

The population of Richland increased spectacularly once operating personnel began arriving in January 1944, reaching a peak of 17,000 in the middle of the year when construction and startup overlapped. It then declined to 15,000 by the end of the year as the construction workers departed. Before the acquisition Richland had an elementary school for 320 students and a high school for 100 students. An additional 16-room elementary school was authorized on 16 March 1943, then a third, and a fourth. The original high school was used in the 1943–1944 school year, but was found to be too small. A new one was authorized in July 1943, and an extension to it in 1944. The four elementary schools and the high school had facilities for 1,900 students.

Electricity was drawn from the Pacific Power and Light Company's 66-kilovolt line. Two 5,000-kilowatt substations and one 10,000-kilowatt substation were built. The central portion of Richland had streetlights but in the outlying parts lighting was provided only at intersections. The streets were paved with asphalt-bound macadam. A sewage treatment plant was built to handle 900,000 US gallons (3,400,000 L) per day; its capacity had to be doubled. Water was drawn from wells (rather than pumping from the Columbia River) and fed into a 1,000,000-US-gallon (3,800,000 L) reservoir. When the water table began to drop, fields around Richland were flooded with water from the irrigation system to maintain it. The total cost of the Richland village up to 31 December 1946 was $43,674,392 (equivalent to $549,000,000 in 2025).

== Personnel ==
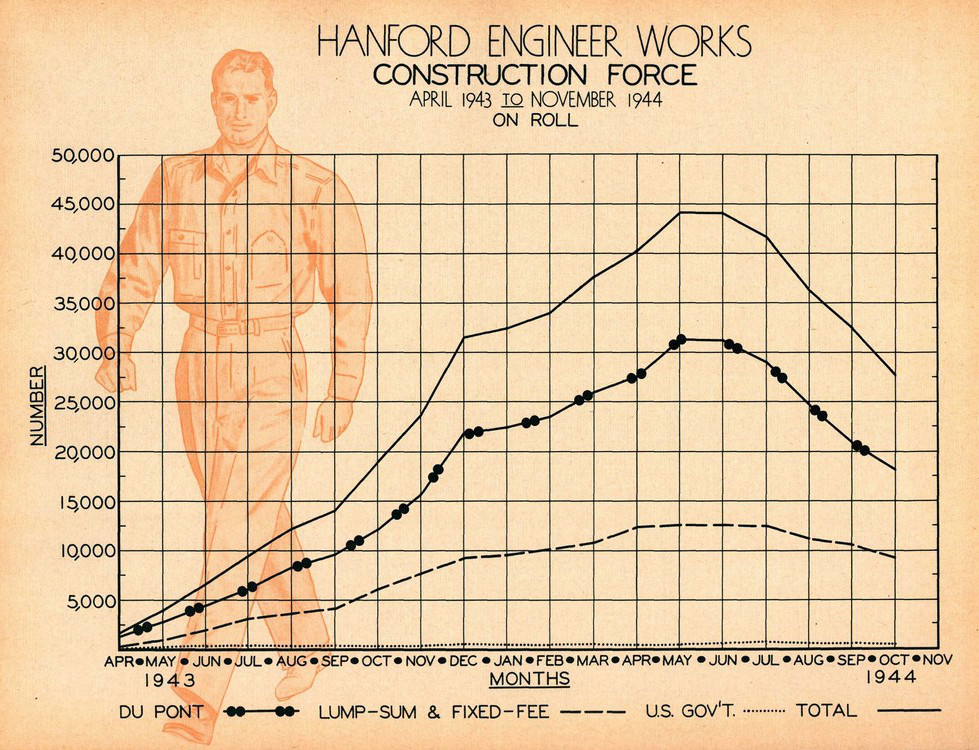
Hanford construction work force

The Manhattan District and DuPont set about recruiting a construction workforce with the help of the United States Employment Service and the War Manpower Commission. DuPont advertised for workers for an unspecified "war construction project", offering an "attractive scale of wages". Daily rates were higher than elsewhere: at Hanford unskilled laborers earned an average of $8 a day (equivalent to $149 in 2025) when $3 to $4 was usual elsewhere in the nation; skilled pipefitters and electricians earned $15 a day when $10 was normal. Between 1943 and 1946, the recruiters interviewed 262,040 people and hired 94,307 of them. The Hanford Engineer Works had high standards. Those hired as welders had to present work records and job references dating back fifteen years and then pass a test that eliminated 80 percent of applicants. Defective welds could not be tolerated, for once the reactors became operational, their 50,000 feet (15,000 m) of welding joints became inaccessible.

The construction workforce reached a peak of 45,096 on 21 June 1944. About 13 percent were women, and 16.45 percent were non-white. African-Americans lived in segregated quarters, had their own messes and recreation areas, and were paid less than white workers. Although DuPont agreed to hire some as construction workers, it had no intention of hiring them as operating personnel. These workers were all white and most were Protestant.

Not all the 1,532 operating personnel had worked for DuPont before, but most came from DuPont ordnance plants in Colorado, Illinois, Tennessee and Utah, where production had been scaled back or halted during 1943. Some were given special training at Oak Ridge or the Metallurgical Laboratory. More than half were over the maximum draft age of 38, and three-quarters of the 3,705 men aged 18 to 26 in the construction workforce were classified as 4-F by the Selective Service System, and not required to serve because they did not meet the Army's minimum standards. The Manhattan District also arranged with local draft boards for exemptions for key personnel. The Selective Service Section of the area engineer's office handled 14,701 requests for exemption and 50 percent were approved. These were forwarded to the draft board with a letter signed by Matthias.

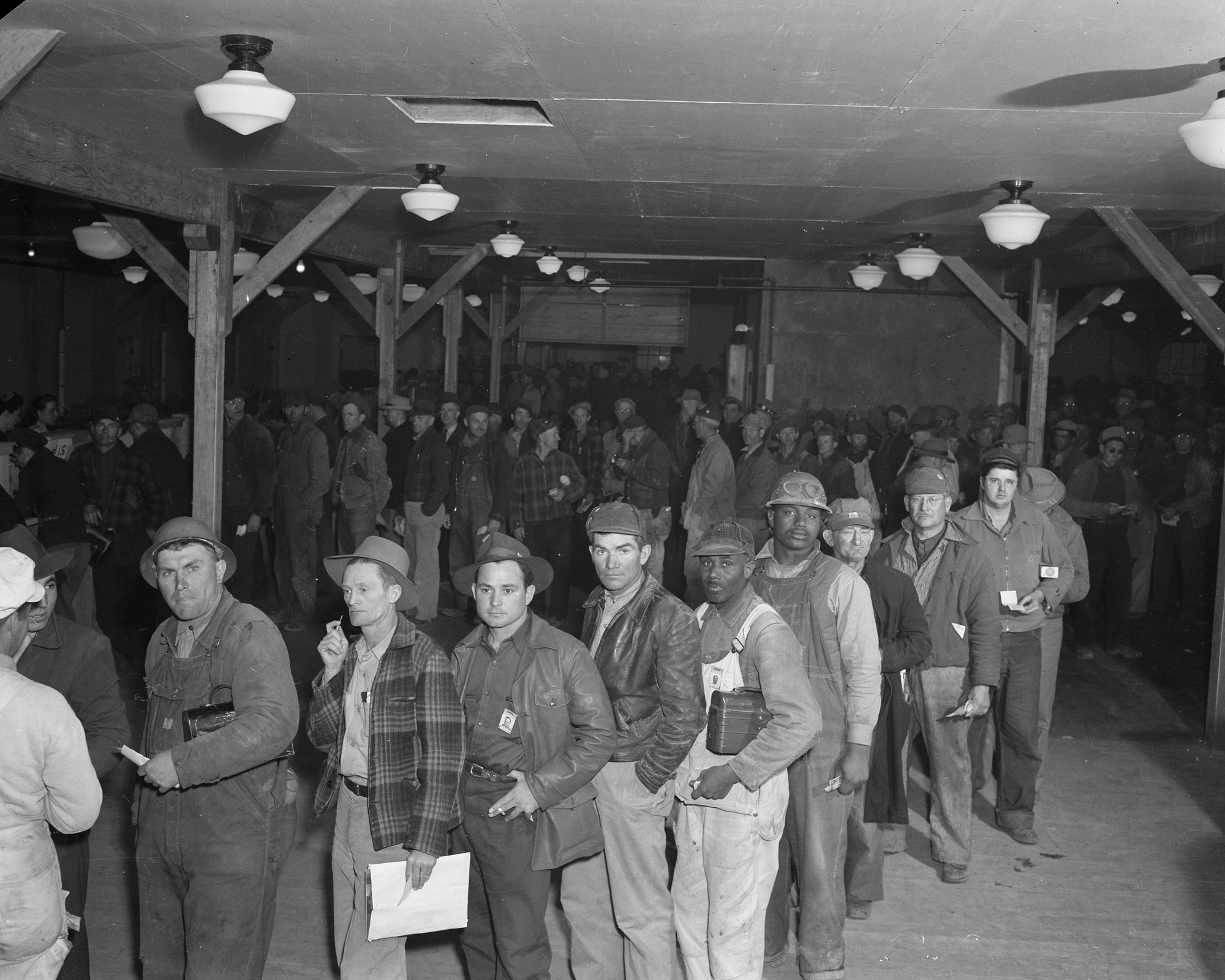
Hanford construction workers

Recruiting workers was one problem; keeping them was another. Turnover was a serious issue. Groves was sufficiently concerned to mandate exit interviews. These revealed that the main causes of dissatisfaction were the isolated site, poor working conditions, and a sense that the work was not important to the war effort, a consequence of the secrecy surrounding the Manhattan Project. To make up for the shortfall in workers, Matthias instituted a five-and-a-half-day and then a six-day work week. Workers worked ten hours a day. An eight-week campaign reduced the rate of absenteeism from 9.8 percent in November 1943 to 5.3 percent in September 1944.

Certain skills were in high demand. One was pipefitting; the reactors required water to cool them, and the chemical separation plants moved materials from stage to stage in pipes. Work had to be of the highest quality, because once radioactive substances were introduced, it would be too dangerous to repair the pipes. Arrangements were made with the International Association of Plumbers and Pipefitters that if any chapter could make twenty or more pipefitters available for the Hanford Engineer Works, the Air Transport Command would fly them in from their home state. In August 1944 the Manhattan District arranged for 198 skilled pipefitters to be furloughed from the Army to work on the project. Stimson specified that they be limited-service personnel not qualified for overseas service. They were transferred to the reserves and taken on by the piping subcontractor as civilians. The first of them arrived at the Hanford Engineer Works on 1 September 1944.

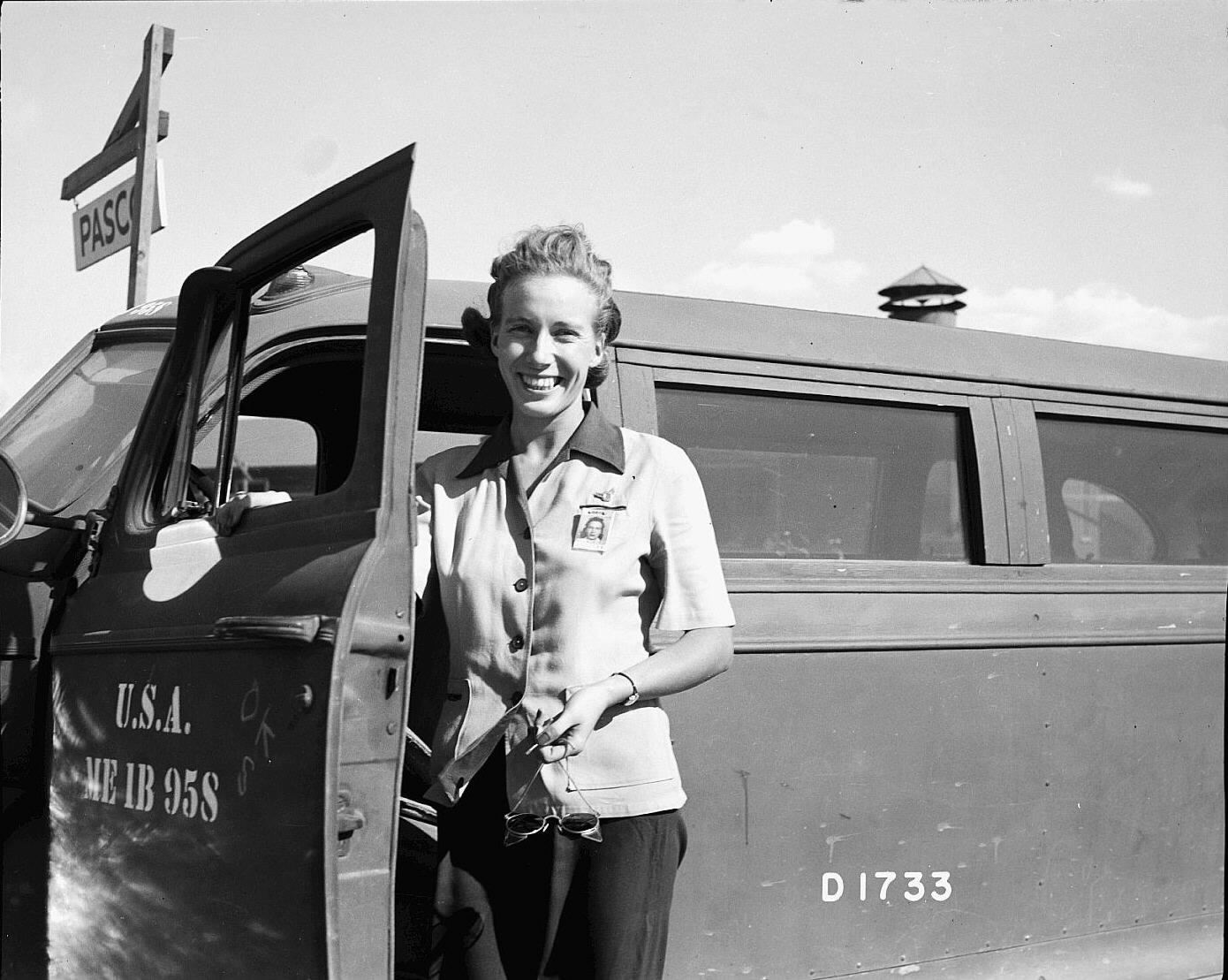
Driver at the Hanford Engineer Works

After an accident in which seven workers died when a tank being moved into position was dropped from a crane, the union asked for local representation. Groves declined the request, but Matthias agreed to collect union dues on behalf of the union. This did not keep the workers from striking, and there were a series of wildcat strikes and stoppages. Nonetheless, the industrial relations record of the Hanford Engineer Works was good. Of 126,265,662 man-hours worked by the construction workforce between December 1943 and December 1946, 15,060 man-hours (0.011 percent) were lost due to stoppages, and 205 of these were disputes with management; the other 14,855 man-hours lost were due to jurisdictional disputes.

At its peak in 1944, about 4,000 women were employed at the HEW. Most were secretaries, clerks, and food service workers, or performed other supporting roles. There was a small detachment of Women's Army Corps, with 16 to 24 WACs, all of whom worked in production. Most of the women were young, lured to the HEW by the promise of good pay and important war work. Groves became concerned about high turnover and hired Buena Maris, the Dean of Women at Oregon State College, as the Supervisor of Women's Activities, at a salary of $4,000 per year (equivalent to $74,000 in 2025). Maris and Margaret Shaw were the only women in top management, and Maris attended the weekly senior staff meetings. Maris hired "house mothers" to look after each barracks. She arranged for late-night, women-only buses, had asphalt sidewalks laid to save shoes being damaged by gravel, and persuaded a women's clothing chain to set up shop in Pasco. She established a Red Cross and a scout troop. She returned to Oregon State University in September 1944.

Another source of labor was prisoners. The Manhattan District arranged with Federal Prison Industries for crops to be harvested by prisoners from the McNeil Island Penitentiary. Most were conscientious objectors. A special camp was established for them with a capacity of 300, and during the war it was almost always full. They weeded the fields, pruned the trees, picked the fruit, harvested the crops, and maintained the irrigation ditches, fences and farm property. Crops harvested were used to supplement the prison diet, with surpluses sold. Initially they farmed between 1,300 and 1,500 acres (530 and 610 ha), but from December 1944 on DuPont reduced the area under cultivation due to radiological hazards, and by October 1946 it had been reduced to 800 acres (320 ha). The number of prisoners fell to 120, because the end of the war reduced the number of incarcerated conscientious objectors, and using hardened criminals created discipline problems.

== Health and safety ==
Conditions at the Hanford Engineer Works undoubtedly were hazardous: workers had to deal with high voltages, toxic chemicals and radioactive substances. Nonetheless, between December 1943 and December 1946, 28,902,042 man-hours were worked by the non-construction workforce with 0.81 accidents per million hours worked, including one fatality, and a severity of 0.26, measured in days lost per thousand hours worked. This was well below the rates for accidents in industry at the time. In 1946, the Hanford Engineer Works won an award for 144 days straight without a workplace accident involving loss of time due to injury; it eventually went without one for 235 days. Stafford L. Warren, the head of the medical section of the Manhattan Project, arranged medical insurance for civilian workers, for which they paid $2.50 per month for singles or $5.00 per month for families.

The medical program at the Hanford Engineer Works was headed by William Dagett Norwood. He secured the services of Herbert M. Parker, a physicist from the Metallurgical Laboratory, who became the health physicist. Norwood oversaw the construction of the Kadlec Hospital, which was staffed by civilians, and dealt with an outbreak of meningitis among the construction workers that resulted in two deaths. Workers in the production facilities wore film badge dosimeters and two small ionization chambers known as "pencils". The pencils were read and their results recorded on a daily basis; the dosimeters on a weekly one. Urine samples were taken to detect radioactive isotopes, particularly plutonium. Some was detected, up to amounts of 0.004 microcuries (0.15 kBq). Between January and August 1944 in the 200 area, which contained the plutonium processing facilities, more than a million pencils and 170,000 dosimeters were processed.

== Facilities ==
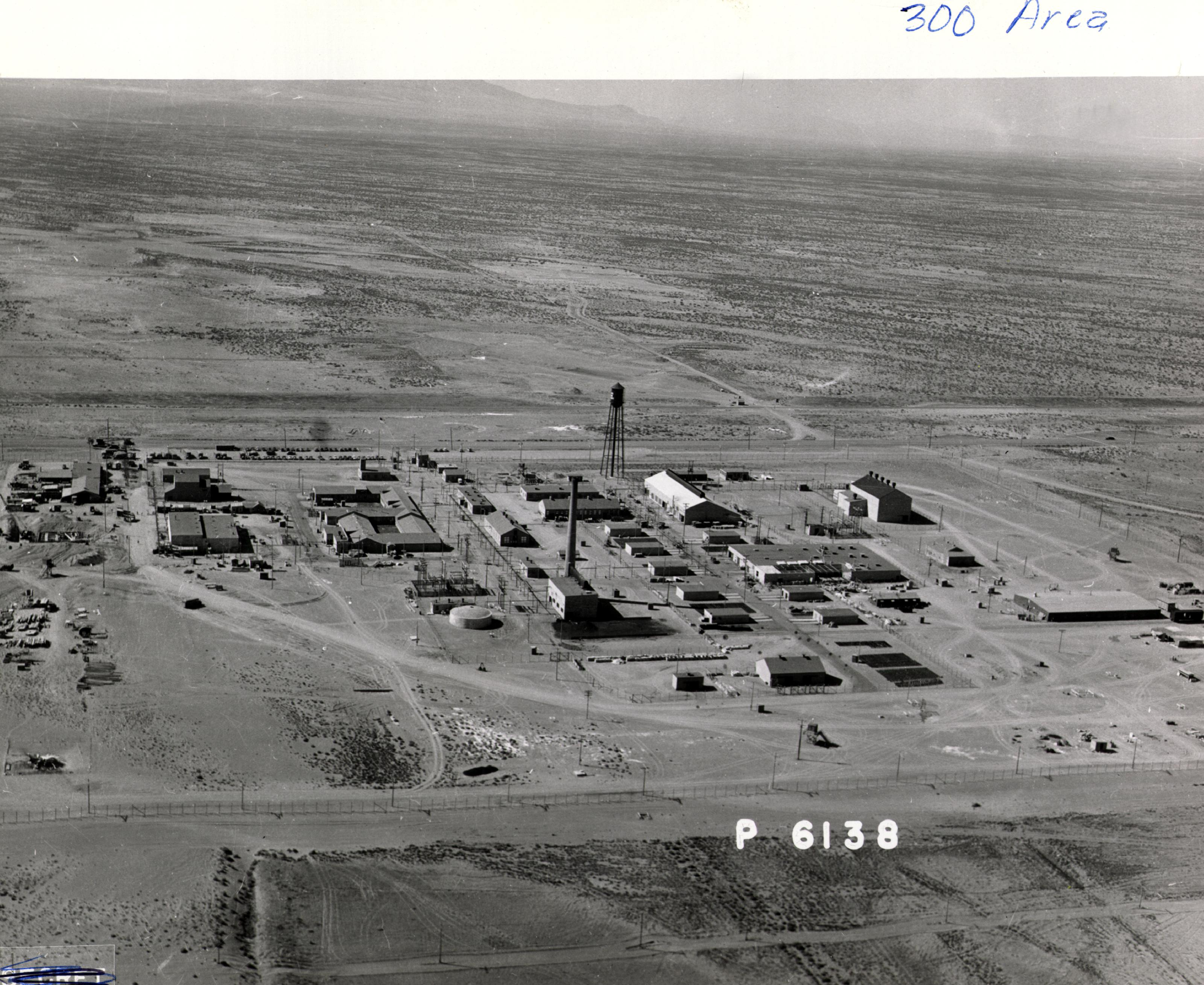
Aerial view of 300 area in 1944

The December 1942 layout of the Hanford Engineer Works provided for three reactors and two separation units, with the option to add another three reactors and a third separation unit. The three reactors were to be located near the Columbia River in the vicinity of White Bluffs in what was called the 100 area, on three sites designated 100-B, 100-D and 100-F. Each was located 6 miles (9.7 km) from any other installation. The 200 area 10 miles (16 km) to the south consisted of three separation sites: 200 W, 200 N and 200 E. Two separation units were situated at 200-W, with about 1 mile (1.6 km) between them, and one at 200-E. There was one other production site, the 300 area, north of Richland.

=== Fabrication ===
The highest priority for construction was the Metal Fabrication and Testing (300) Area, for it contained facilities without which the others could not operate. Its 41 permanent buildings and 19 facilities included those for testing materials to be used in construction and operations, and for fabricating the uranium fuel elements used by the reactors. Only three or four of its buildings were urgently required though. Considerable difficulty was encountered in meeting the deadlines. The biggest problem was that the function of the Hanford Engineer Works was novel, and there was little previous experience on which to draw. Plans were subject to change during the construction process as more was learned. This was especially true of the laboratory testing areas.

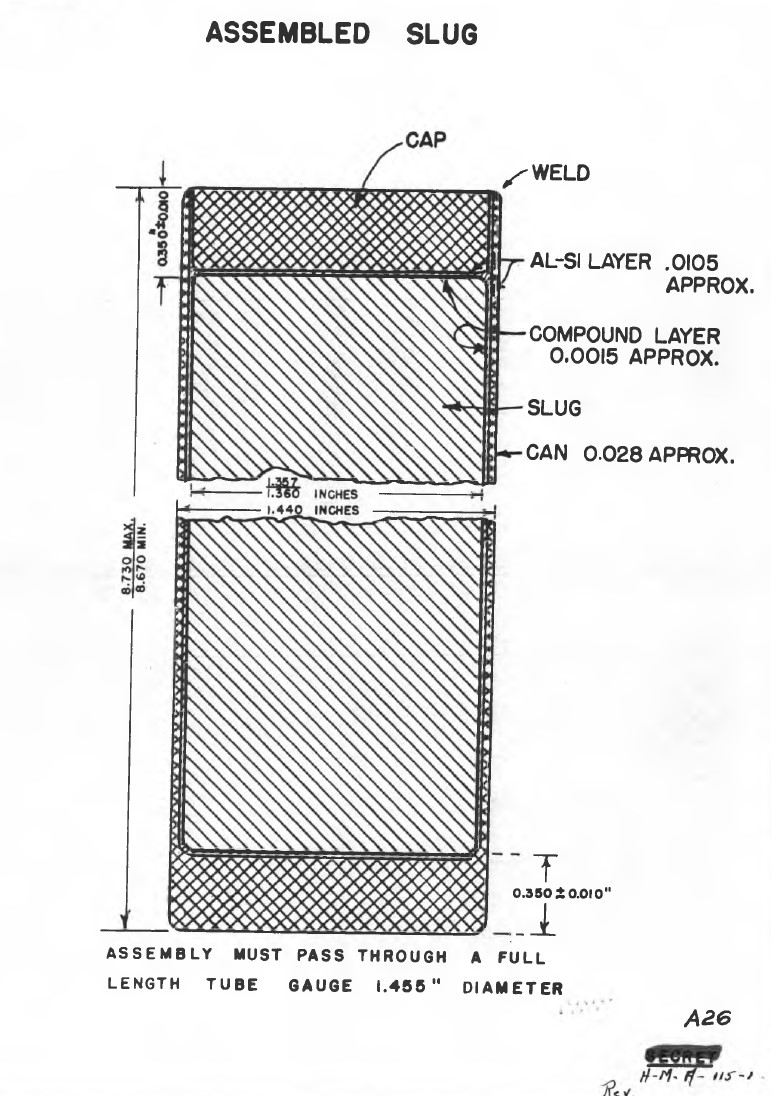
Assembled uranium slug

Uranium arrived at the Hanford Engineer Works in the form of billets roughly 4 1/2 inches (11 cm) in diameter and 12 to 20 inches (30 to 50 cm) long. In the Metal Fabrication and Testing (500) Area they were heated to 1,700 °F (930 °C) in a furnace with an inert argon gas atmosphere, and extruded through a die by means of a hydraulic press to form rods 1 1/2 inches (3.8 cm) in diameter and about 12 feet (3.7 m) long. They were then quenched in water and heated again in an argon atmosphere to prevent the formation of gas pockets or compounds of uranium and hydrogen. The rods were straightened and machined with lathes into pieces, known as "slugs", 1.569 inches (3.99 cm) in diameter and 8 inches (20 cm) long. The initial charge of the three reactors required more than 20,000 billets, and another two thousand were required each month.

It was the next step that caused the most problems. The uranium had to be protected from corrosion by the cooling water, and the cooling water from contamination by radioactive fission products. The ideal canning substance had a high resistance to corrosion by water, a low capacity for absorbing neutrons, and was capable of transmitting heat to the cooling water. This narrowed the choice of materials down to aluminum and aluminum-silicon alloy. Uranium is highly reactive with water, so the can had to be watertight. It also had to be airtight to prevent gaseous fission products from escaping, and it had to be strong; a burst can would release fission products, and could jam in the reactor, stop the flow of cooling water, and force a complete shutdown of the reactor.

DuPont investigated the problem at the Hanford Engineering Works, while the Metallurgical Laboratory studied it in Chicago. Uranium was so reactive that oxidation occurred no matter how quickly the canning process was applied. Several techniques were tried without success, as they failed to get the required exact fit. A contract was let for unbonded slugs in case no canning process could be found, but this was unnecessary. One evening DuPont's Raymond Grills and his assistant Ed Smith tried performing the canning operation in a bath of molten solder, which kept the oxygen away. They found that this created a uniform heating of the slug, and a snug fit of the aluminum can, although the heat melted a hole in it. The technique therefore involved dip coating the slug, first in a molten bath of 50–50 copper–tin alloy, then in one of aluminum-silicon alloy. The aluminum can was heated and chemically cleaned, and placed in a protective steel sleeve, and then in a press, with a small quantity of molten aluminum-silicon alloy added. The hot slug and aluminum cap were then pressed into the can at elevated temperature, displacing most of the molten aluminum-silicon alloy but leaving enough to fill any voids. The cap was then arc welded onto the can in an argon atmosphere.

Slug production commenced in June 1944 and by September enough canned slugs had been accumulated to commence loading the first reactor. In August 1944, the process was improved by reducing the temperature of the copper–tin alloy by 50 °F (28 °C). This lifted the number of acceptable canned slugs from a few percent to more than 75 percent. In September, the hydraulic presses were abandoned in favor of a process in which the slugs, cans and tops were assembled manually in the solder bath. This increased the number of acceptable canned slugs to over 90 percent. The canned slugs were visually inspected for warps or defects. They were then subjected to the frost test. This involved cleaning the slug with carbon tetrachloride and spraying with a nearly saturated solution of acenaphthene to produce a smooth white film on the surface. If there was a defect, the heat induced was above the 203 °F (95 °C) melting point of acenaphthene and it melted at the point of the defect. Slugs were then tested by being exposed to steam at 347 °F (175 °C) and 100 pounds per square inch (690 kPa) for forty hours. Less than one faulty slug was found for each 2,000 tested. Those found to be defective had their coatings dissolved using a mixture of caustic soda and sodium nitrate, followed by an immersion In hydrofluoric acid and a final wash with nitric acid.

=== Irradiation ===
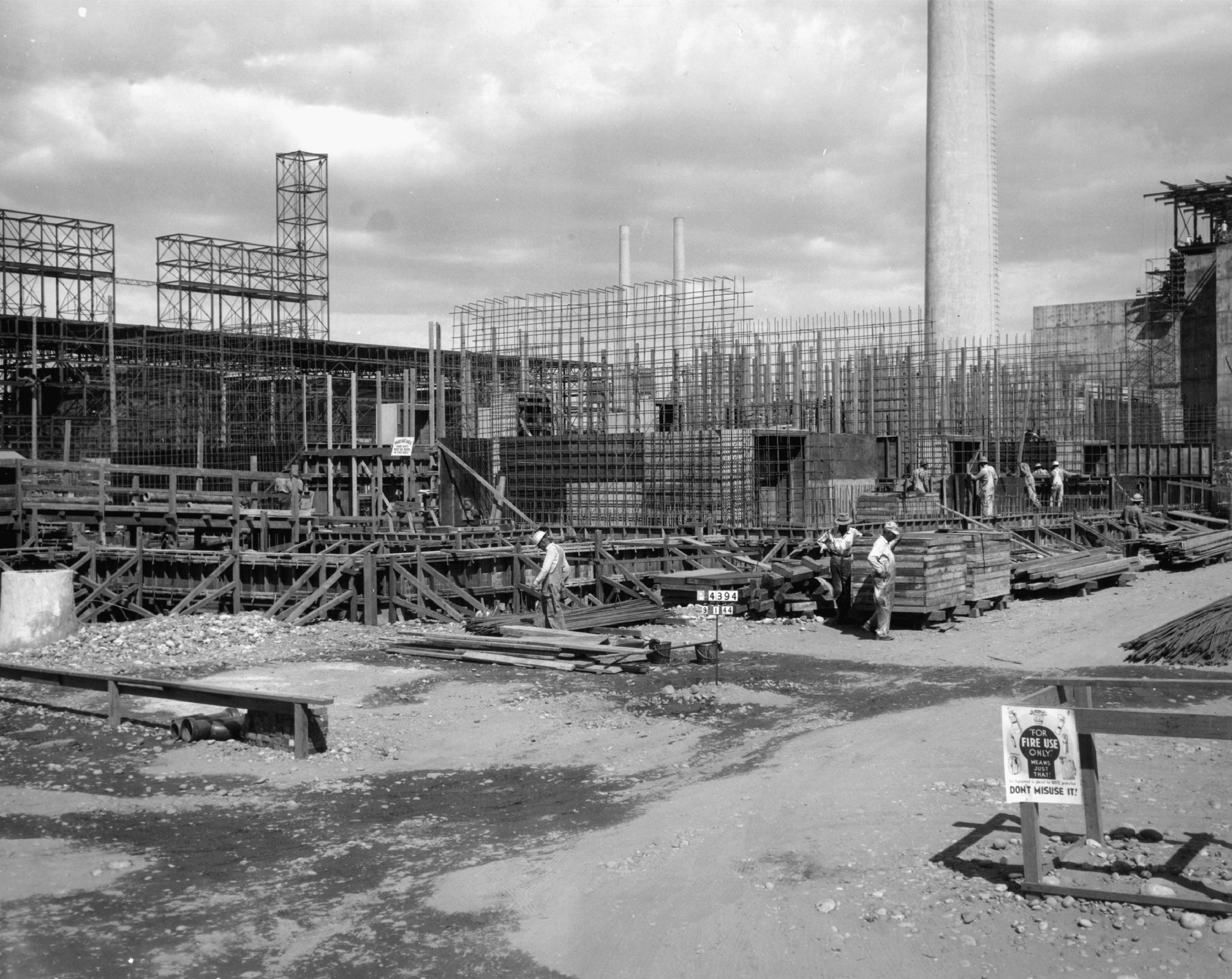
B Reactor under construction on 9 January 1944

Construction work on the reactors could not commence until the TNX Department at DuPont in Wilmington released the plans, which did not occur until 4 October 1943, but the engineers were aware that they were to be water cooled and run at 250 MW. Construction therefore commenced on the cooling water facilities in area 100-B on 27 August. The reactors would normally run at 65 °C (149 °F), well below the boiling point of water, both for safety and because aluminum corrodes at high temperatures. Ninety-four percent of the heat was in the canned slugs, with most of the rest in the graphite moderator.

It was estimated that each reactor would require 30,000 US gallons per minute (1,900 L/s) of cooling water and the three separation areas would require another 5,000 US gallons per minute (320 L/s) between them. This would normally be enough for a city of a million people. However, although the reactor could be shut down in two and a half seconds, it would continue to generate about one-fifth of the full-power heat due to the decay of fission products, which would diminish slowly. It was therefore vital that the flow of water should not cease. For this reason, forty pumps with a total capacity of 355,000 US gallons per minute (22,400 L/s) were installed. If the power failed, the steam pumps would automatically cut in and continue to deliver water at full capacity for long enough to allow an orderly shutdown.

Consideration was given to using groundwater, which would save the cost of building filtration plants, but tests indicated that the supply was inadequate even for one reactor. Water therefore had to be drawn from the Columbia River. Water intakes were designed to protect the fish. Facilities had to be provided to remove algae, solids, gases and dissolved minerals from the water. In the summer, the water would be too warm, so refrigeration was required. To save time, this was omitted from the first reactor to be built, B Reactor, which would initially operate during the winter months when the water required no refrigeration.

Helium was circulated through the reactors to provide an additional non-neutron absorbing coolant and a means of reducing the temperature differentials in parts of the reactor. Moisture was removed from the helium using silica gel and impurities removed by passing it through a charcoal filter. It entered the reactor through a duct in the floor and passed through the reactor via a horizontal manifold at the front, eventually being collected through a horizontal manifold at the rear.

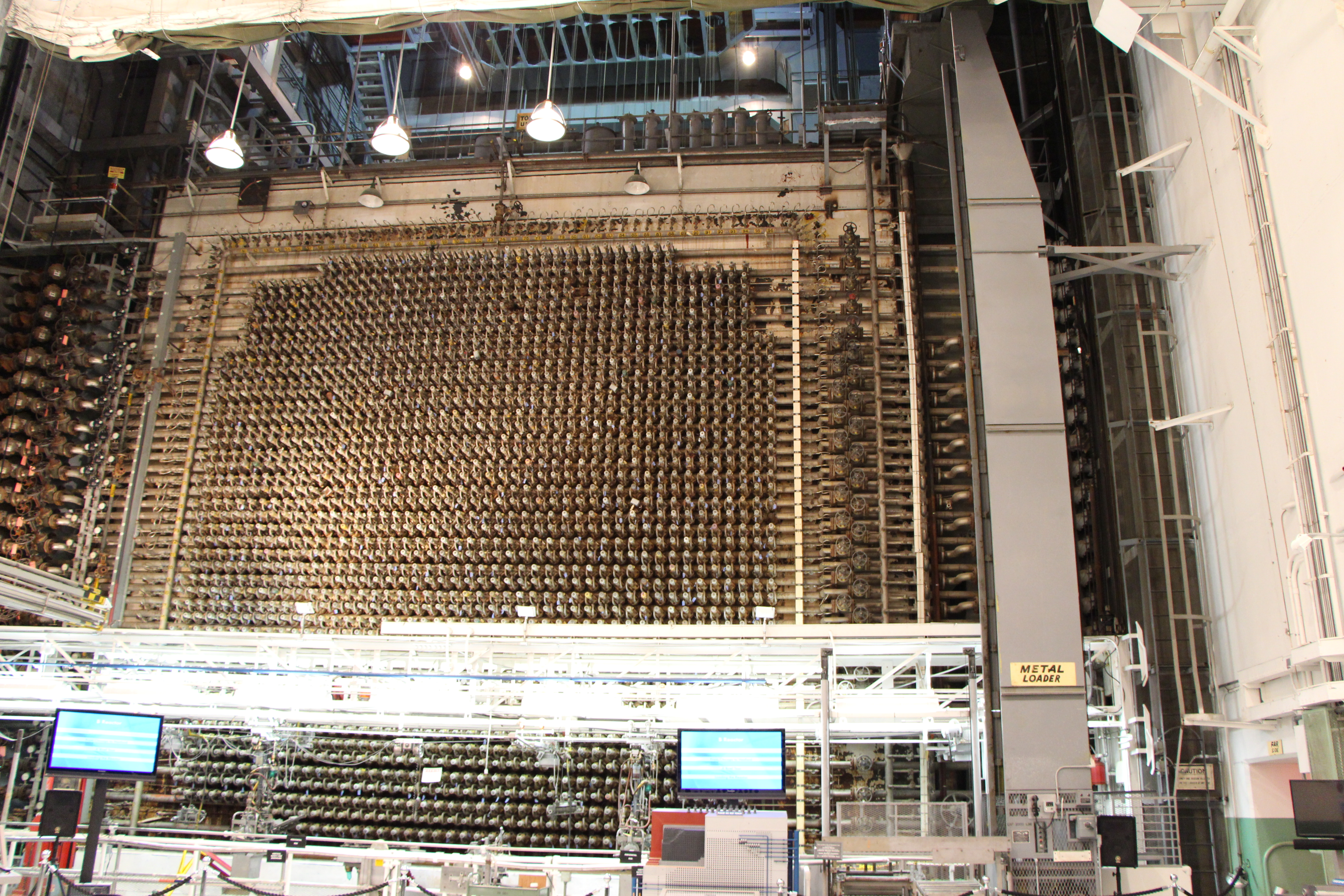
Front face of B Reactor in 2013

On 1 February 1944, with the 28-foot (8.5 m) thick concrete floor of the reactor building poured, workmen began assembling the reactor itself. The workmen set cast-iron blocks that would form the thermal shield, and the 726 laminated steel and Masonite sheets, each weighing 10 short tons (9.1 t) that would form the biological shield on the front (charge) and rear (discharge). The steel absorbed gamma rays and provided structural strength. The wood in the Masonite, being rich in hydrogen, absorbed gamma rays and neutrons. The steel came in sheets 1 7/8 inches (4.8 cm) thick and the Masonite in sheets 1/8 inch (0.32 cm) thick. Each wall contained 26 inches (66 cm) of steel and 24 inches (61 cm) of Masonite. The biological shield used 20,000 short tons (18,000 t) of steel and 7,600,000 square feet (710,000 m^{2}) of Masonite. The thermal shield also absorbed radiation, but its primary purpose was to prevent the concrete front disintegrating under neutron bombardment. It consisted of 15,000 10-inch (25 cm) cast-iron blocks, and was placed between the graphite and the biological shield.

The cast-iron base was then laid. This was welded to the similar sections front, back and sides sections to completely encase the reactor and make it airtight. The top, bottom, front and back faces were 10 inches (25 cm) thick, and those on the sides were 8 inches (20 cm) thick. The front and rear faces contained 2004 holes for the aluminum tubes. In the Metallurgical Laboratory's original design there were 1,500 tubes arranged in a circle in the middle of the faces. DuPont's George Graves altered this to fill in the corners as well as a factor of safety, resulting in 2,004 holes. There were 29 holes in the top for vertical control rods, and nine in the sides for horizontal control rods. The front and discharge faces also contained 208 holes for the cooling water pipes. An elevator at the front supported a machine for emplacing the charges. The thermal shield had close tolerances: the base had to be machined to an accuracy of 0.008 inches (0.20 mm), and have a flatness after grouting in the concrete of ±0.005 inches (0.13 mm). The base was complete on 19 May.

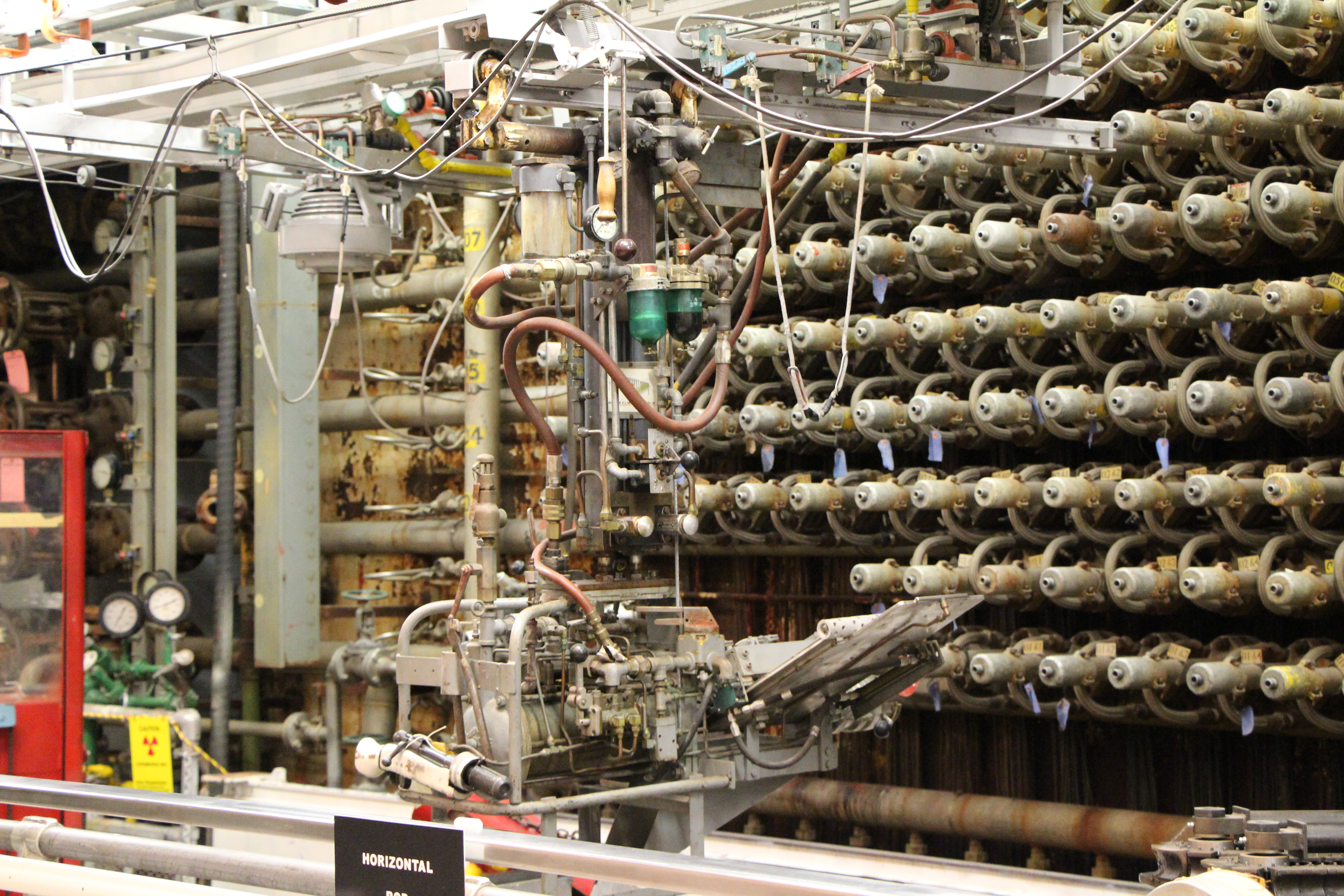
B Reactor's automatic tube loader

Then came the graphite. This arrived from the manufacturer in 10-to-40-inch (25 to 102 cm) long blocks with a 4 3/16-inch (10.6 cm) square cross section. Based on experience with the X-10 Graphite Reactor at the Clinton Engineer Works, the blocks were finished on site. An assembly-line process was used for this. Each block was carefully cleaned and numbered. Precision and cleanliness were emphasized; the workmen wore special uniforms and placed the graphite blocks with gloved hands. Each layer was vacuumed to remove dirt and dust. The last block was laid on 11 June, and the top shield was installed. The result was a mass of graphite 36 feet (11 m) across, 36 feet (11 m) high and 24 feet (7.3 m) from front to back. The reactors contained no moving parts; the only sounds were those of the pumps.

Compton, Fermi, Greenewalt, Matthias, Williams and personnel from Wilmington and the Metallurgical Laboratory were on hand for the startup of B Reactor on 13 September 1944. That day the Operations Department accepted responsibility for the 100-B area from the Construction Department, including some minor work that was unfinished. Fermi inserted the first slug at 17:43. A chain reaction commenced with no cooling water in the reactor (dry critical) at 02:30 on 15 September with 400 tubes loaded. With water flowing through the pipes, wet critical was achieved at 17:30 on 18 September, with 834 tubes loaded. Production operations commenced in low power mode at 22:48 on 26 September. The power was increased to 9 megawatts, but after an hour the operators noticed that power had started dropping off and by 18:30 on 27 September the reactor had shut down completely. The following morning the reactor suddenly started up, but it shut down again when the power level was raised.

The possibility that there was coolant leak or a contaminant in the water was investigated, but no evidence was found. Suspicion then fell on there being an unknown neutron poison being generated as a fission product. Compton asked Walter Zinn to look for evidence in the Chicago Pile-3 reactor at Argonne and Richard L. Doan to investigate with the X-10 Graphite Reactor at the Clinton Engineer Works. Doan could not find anything, but Zinn ran the Chicago Pile-3 at full power for twelve hours and detected the same pattern of decay and neutron capture as at Hanford. He reported that "there can be little doubt that the high cross-section poisoning product is xenon-135."

Fermi and Greenewalt independently determined that xenon-135 was the culprit. Although its neutron-absorbing properties – 70 times greater than any previously known isotope – came as a surprise, the possibility of a neutron poison being created had been considered. It was calculated that the reactor could operate at 14 megawatts with 1,000 tubes loaded, 94 megawatts with 1,600 tubes, and 216 megawatts with 2,004 tubes. This demonstrated the benefit of the extra tubes. It also helped that the reactor had nine control rods instead of just three, which permitted an orderly shutdown with the extra fuel.

The amount of time a slug needed to be irradiated depended on the power the reactor was running at, and the position of the slug inside the reactor; those in the center of the reactor were exposed to a higher neutron flux and required less time. Every four to six weeks, about a quarter of the tubes would be discharged at a time. As the operators gained experience, the discharge rate rose from 10 to 50 tubes per eight-hour shift.

=== Separation ===
The next phase in the production process was to separate the plutonium in the irradiated slugs from the uranium and fission products. Each separation plant included a ventilation building for the disposal of radioactive gases and a waste storage area for solid and liquid wastes. The original plan called for eight separation plants, but as a result of experience gained at the pilot plant at the Clinton Engineer Works this was reduced to four and then, in the summer of 1944, to three: T and U plants at 200-W and B plant at 200-E.

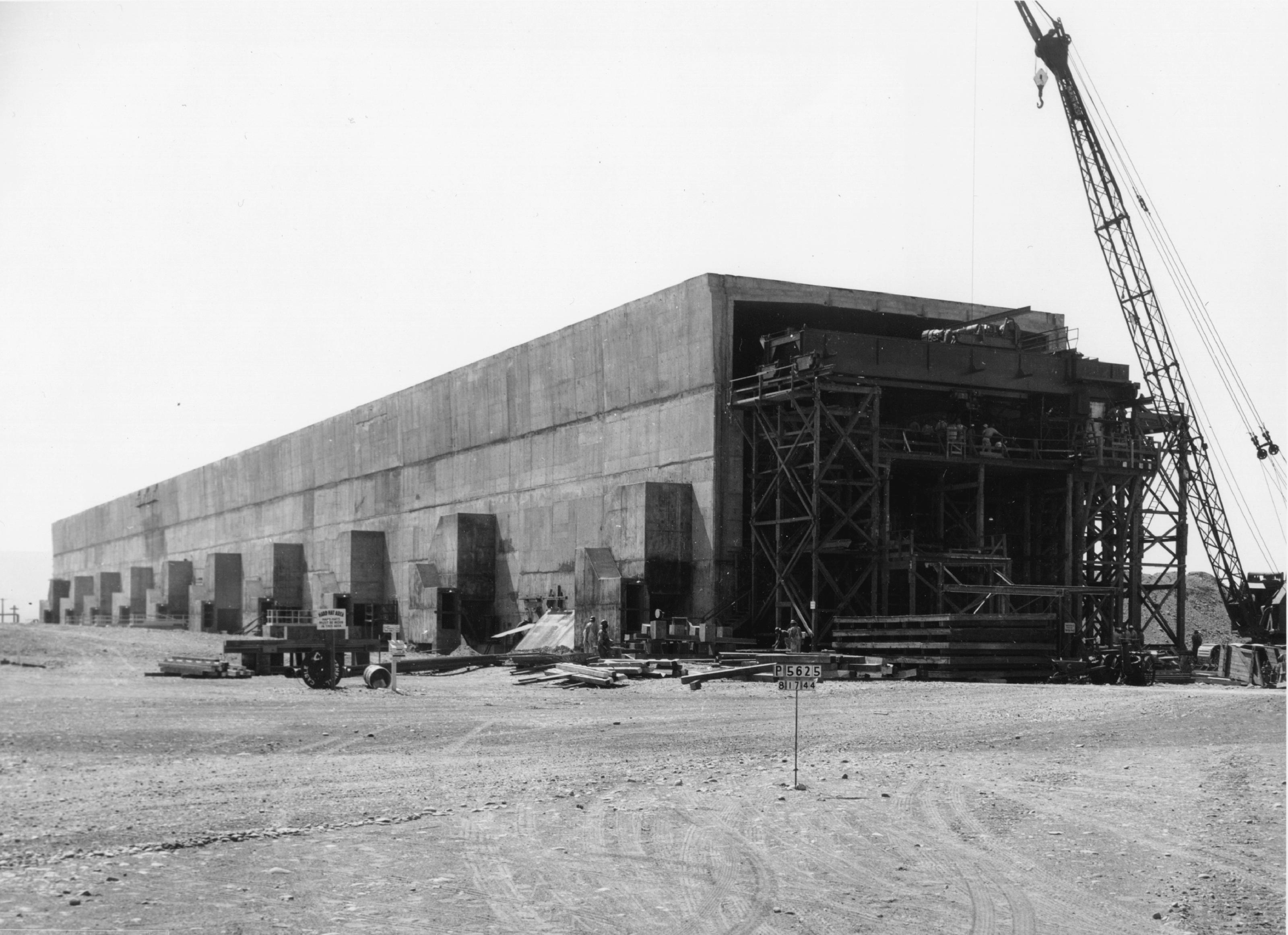
221-T building under construction

Priority for construction was accorded to facilities in the 300 and 100 areas, as they were required first, and there was insufficient skilled labor to work on all the areas simultaneously. Little work was done on the 200 areas until January 1944. Although construction commenced on 26 June 1943, the work at 200-W was only three percent complete by the end of the year. The construction of the separation building, 221-T, was also affected by delays in delivery of critical equipment such as stainless steel pipe and the 10-ton crane. There were also some late design changes. The pace picked up in mid-1944, and 100-W was completed in December. Ground was broken in the 100-E area on 2 August 1943, but work was only six percent complete at the end of April 1944. It was completed in February 1945. Ground was broken at 200-N on 17 November 1943, and was completed in November 1944. T plant began processing irradiated slugs on 26 December 1944; B Plant followed on 13 April 1945. U plant never did, and was used as a training facility.

The quantity of plutonium in each canned slug was dependent on the time spent in the reactor, the position in the reactor, and the power level of the reactor. The history of each of the 70,000 slugs in each reactor was recorded and tracked with an automatic index card machine. Tubes could be selectively discharged. Discharge was effected simultaneously with recharging: as new slugs were inserted into the tube, the irradiated ones fell out the discharge side onto a neoprene mattress and then rolled into the water-filled discharge storage basin. The water was deep enough to shield the working area above from radiation. The slugs were sorted manually with long tongs and placed into buckets suspended from an overhead monorail system. The buckets were weighed, placed into lead-lined water-cooled casks and transported to the lag storage (200-N) area on a special railroad car operated by remote control. Each tank car carried two casks. Here, they were stored underwater to allow short-lived but highly-radioactive fission products to decay.

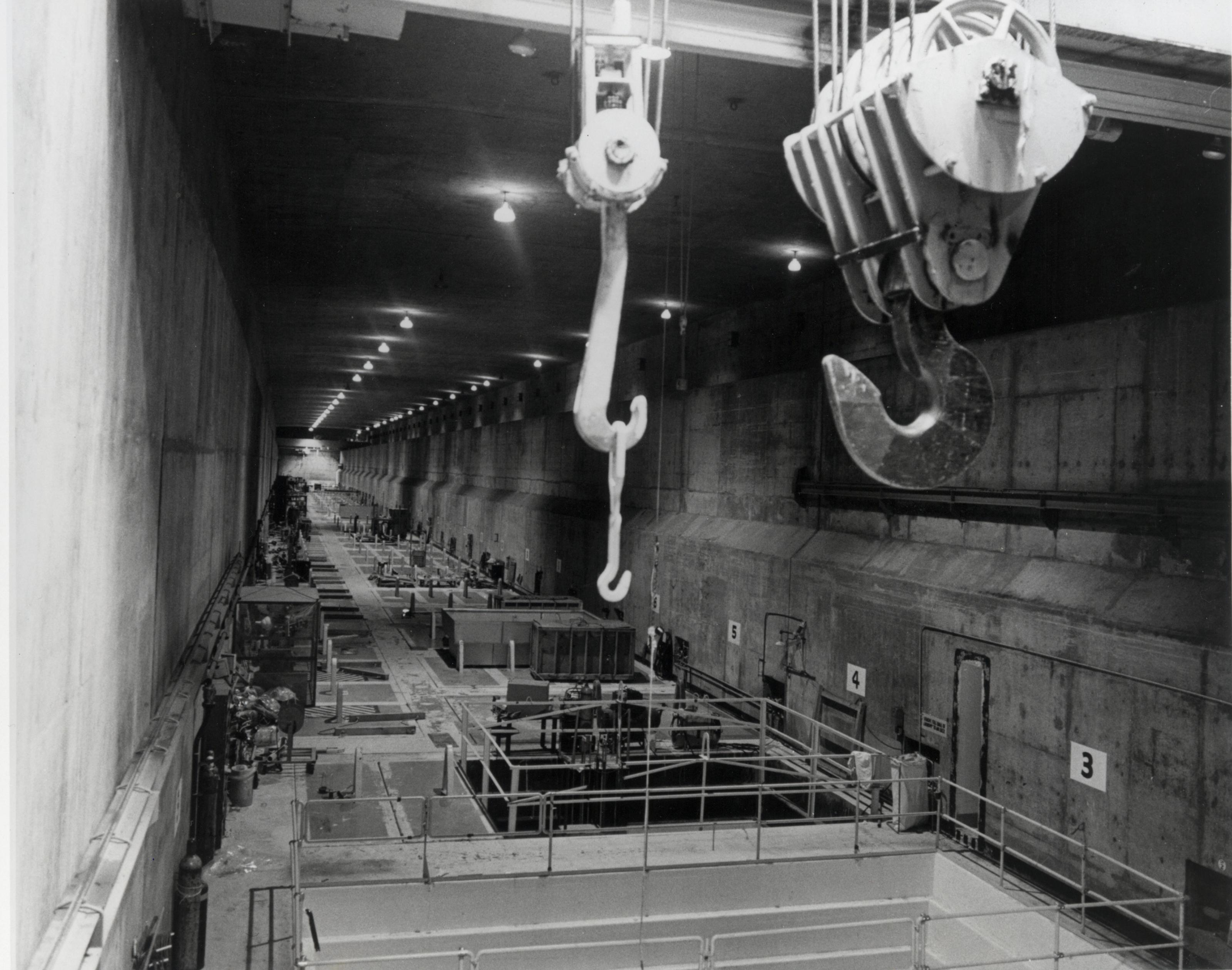
Inside the 221-T building

The separation buildings were massive windowless concrete structures, 800 feet (240 m) long, 80 feet (24 m) high and 65 feet (20 m) wide, with concrete walls 3 to 5 feet (0.91 to 1.52 m) thick. Inside, the buildings were canyons and galleries. The galleries contained piping and equipment. The canyons were divided into 22 sections in T plant and 20 in B plant. Each section contained two concrete cells. Sections were 40 feet (12 m) long, except for sections 1, 2 and 20, which were 44 feet (13 m) long. Most of the cells were 15 feet (4.6 m) square and 20 feet (6.1 m) deep, and were separated from each other by 6-foot (1.8 m) thick concrete blocks.

Items could be moved about with a 60-foot (18 m) long overhead crane. Once the canyons began processing irradiated slugs, the machinery would become so radioactive that it would be unsafe for humans ever to come in contact with it. The engineers had to devise methods to allow for the replacement of any component via remote control. They came up with a modular cell concept, which allowed major components to be removed and replaced by an operator sitting in a heavily shielded overhead crane.

Periscopes and closed-circuit television gave the crane operator a better view of the process. It was found that radiation blackened the glass lenses of the periscopes, so plastic ones were used instead. The operators generally preferred the periscopes, designed by the Metallurgical Laboratory and DuPont in Chicago and built by DuPont in Wilmington, to the closed-circuit television, as the picture quality of the latter was poor. Raymond Genereaux, the manager of the separation plants, had the operators assemble all the equipment inside by remote control as if the area was already radioactive.

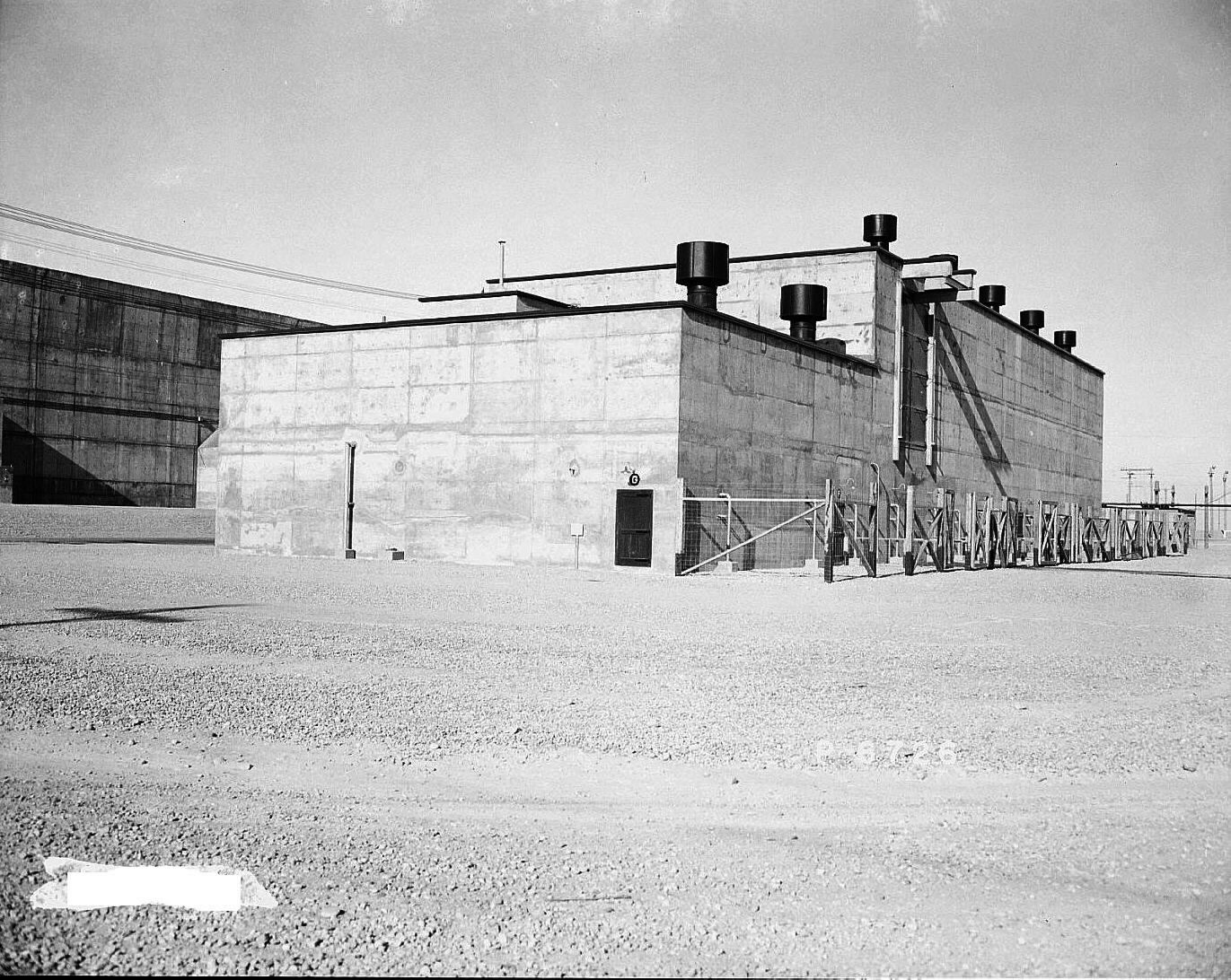
Building 224-T in December 1944

A series of chemical processing steps separated the plutonium from the remaining uranium and the fission waste products. The slugs were dumped into a dissolver, covered with sodium nitrate solution and brought to a boil, followed by slow addition of sodium hydroxide. After removing the waste and washing the slugs, nitric acid was used to dissolve them. Bismuth nitrate and phosphoric acid were added, producing bismuth phosphate, which was precipitated carrying the plutonium with it. The precipitate was removed from the solution with a centrifuge and the liquid discharged as waste. This reduced the gamma radiation by 90 percent. The precipitate was placed in another tank and dissolved in nitric acid. Sodium bismuthate or potassium permanganate was added to oxidize the plutonium. The bismuth phosphate was precipitated, and the plutonium left behind in solution. This step was then repeated.

The plutonium-bearing solution now had 100,000-th of the original gamma radiation. It was transferred from the 221 buildings to the 224 Bulk Reduction buildings through underground pipes. These were 40-foot (12 m) high, three-story concrete structures located 150 feet (46 m) to the rear of the 221 buildings. Phosphoric acid was added, and the bismuth phosphate precipitated and removed. In the "crossover" step, a lanthanum fluoride process was used. Lanthanum salts and hydrogen fluoride were added, and lanthanum fluoride was precipitated, leaving the plutonium in solution. This removed lanthanides that the bismuth phosphate process could not remove. The process was then repeated. This time potassium hydroxide was added to metathesize the solution. Liquid was removed with a centrifuge and the solid dissolved in nitric acid to form plutonium nitrate. At this point, a 330-US-gallon (1,200 L) batch sent to the 224-T building would have been concentrated to 8 US gallons (30 L). The final step was carried out at the 231-Z Isolation building, where hydrogen peroxide, sulfates and ammonium nitrate were added to the solution and the plutonium precipitated. It was dissolved in nitric acid and put into shipping cans, which were boiled in hot air to produce a plutonium nitrate paste.

Radioactive wastes from the chemical separations process were deposited in tank farms consisting of 64 single-shell underground waste tanks (241-B, 241-C, 241-T, and 241-U).

== Operations ==
On 19 July 1944, Charles A. Thomas informed Williams and Greenewalt that Robert Oppenheimer, the director of the Manhattan Project's Los Alamos Laboratory, had given up all hope of getting the Thin Man gun-type nuclear weapon to work. Los Alamos had discovered that reactor-bred plutonium contained an unacceptably high amount of the plutonium-240 isotope, which had a far higher spontaneous fission rate than plutonium-239. A gun could not fire a plutonium bullet fast enough to avoid predetonation, and prospects for separating the isotopes seemed dim. The Los Alamos Laboratory was now going to concentrate on the development of the Fat Man implosion-type nuclear weapon.

A meeting with Groves and James B. Conant in Washington, DC, was arranged for 21 July. At this point, Reactor B was nearly complete, but Reactor D was several months behind it, and Reactor F was not even a quarter complete. If the Los Alamos Laboratory was somehow able to design and build a working implosion weapon in just a few months, then each bomb would require only a few kilograms of plutonium, and there might be no need for Reactor F. If not, then there would be no need for any of the reactors at all. Groves and Conant were not convinced that the figures they had were reliable enough to take such a drastic step as canceling Reactor F, and they suggested that Williams and Greenewalt discuss the issue with Fermi when they got back to Hanford. They did, and Fermi confirmed that an implosion-type weapon would indeed require much less plutonium. In the event, the Fat Man actually used 6.2 kilograms of plutonium.

Reactor startup
Reactor	Charging commenced	Charging completed	In operation	Full power
B	13 September 1944	28 December 1944	26 September 1944	4 February 1945
D	5 December 1944	10 December 1944	17 December 1944	11 February 1945
F	15 February 1945	19 February 1945	25 February 1945	8 March 1945

The first batch of plutonium was refined in the 221-T plant between 26 December 1944 and 2 February 1945. Batches of plutonium nitrate were despatched in a small truck in twenty metal containers inside wooden boxes, escorted by two patrol cars. Matthias personally couriered it by train from Portland to Los Angeles, where he hand delivered it to a courier from Los Alamos. He chose to send it by road because he considered air was too risky and rail too slow. By 28 March, all three reactors were operating at full power, 250 megawatts, for the first time, and by April, trains containing kilogram-quantity shipments of plutonium were headed to Los Alamos every five days. Road convoys replaced the trains in May, and in late July shipments began being despatched by air from the airport at Hanford. The plutonium shipped to Los Alamos was at least 98 percent pure. The only complaint from Los Alamos was the presence of silica fibers left over from the filtration process; these were reduced as the production process was refined and fewer filtrations were required.

On 10 March 1945, a Japanese balloon bomb struck a high-tension line running between Grand Coulee and Bonneville. This caused a surge in the lines to the reactors. A scram was automatically initiated and the safety devices shut the reactors down. The bomb failed to explode and the transmission line was not badly damaged. The Hanford Engineer Works was the only US nuclear facility to come under enemy attack.

At Oppenheimer's request, the Hanford Engineer Works also produced polonium-210. Greenewalt protested the diversion of plutonium production capacity to Compton, but to no avail; polonium was required for the Fat Man's neutron initiators, and concentrating all production at the X-10 Graphite Reactor at Oak Ridge would jeopardize the entire effort if there was a mishap there. On 1 May four tubes in D reactor were loaded with 264 slugs containing bismuth. The irradiated bismuth slugs were shipped to Los Alamos for processing. After June 1945, bismuth irradiated at Hanford was sent to the Dayton Project in Dayton, Ohio for bulk polonium extraction. By the end of 1946, the HEW was supplying raw material that contained as much as 13.2 millicuries of polonium per gram of bismuth. This was far more dangerous to handle than that from the X-10 Graphite Reactor due to the greater beta and gamma radiation from small amounts of heavy metal impurities in the bismuth.

There was intense pressure in June and early July to produce more plutonium for the Trinity test on 16 July 1945, and in late July for operational use. Experiments were conducted in increasing the batch size. This was dangerous, as it was not known how much plutonium-bearing liquid could be safely handled without the risk of a criticality accident. Changes were made to procedures in July and August to minimize the risk. The length of the cooling period was cut to less than thirty days, and possibly as short as fifteen days.

== Postwar ==
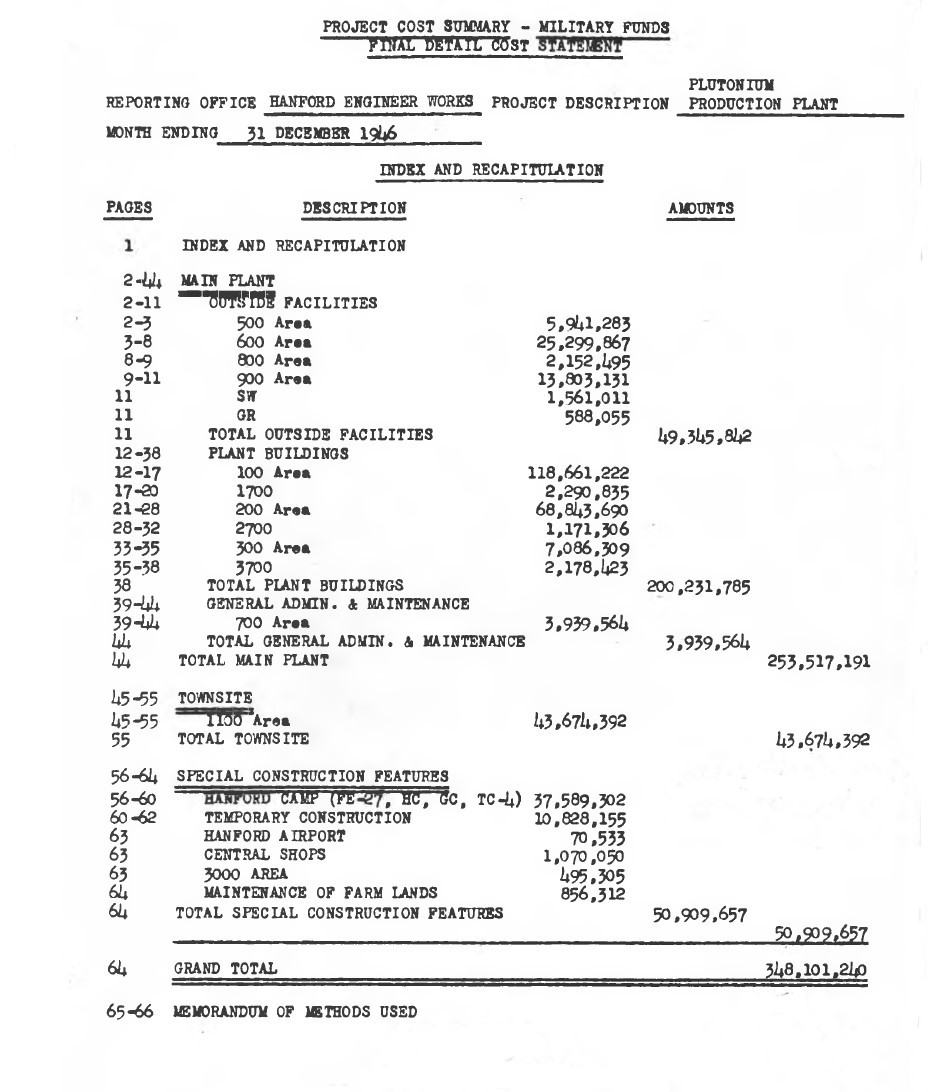
Project cost summary through 31 December 1946: "GRAND TOTAL 348,101,240"

Throughout the war, the Manhattan Project maintained a top secret classification. Until news arrived of the atomic bombing of Hiroshima, fewer than one percent of Hanford's workers knew they were working on a nuclear weapons project. Groves noted that "We made certain that each member of the project thoroughly understood his part in the total effort; that, and nothing more." The words "uranium" and "plutonium" were forbidden; the former was "base metal" and the latter "product". Posters and cartoons featuring "Security Jane" and "Corporal Paddy" exhorted workers to avoid talking about the work they did.

The existence and purpose of Hanford was publicly revealed through press releases on 7 and 9 August 1945, after the 6 August bombing of Hiroshima but before Hanford plutonium in a Fat Man bomb was used in the bombing of Nagasaki on 9 August. Further details came with the publication of the Smyth Report on 12 August 1945. The general public was now informed about Hanford, although the report did not reveal many of Hanford's secrets. Groves presented the Hanford Engineer Works with the Army-Navy "E" Award on 20 October 1945. He arranged for Senators Hugh Mitchell, Homer S. Ferguson and Harley M. Kilgore to be given a guided tour of the Hanford Engineer Works. They were the first civilians not directly connected with the Manhattan Project to enter a process building.

Matthias was succeeded as area engineer by Colonel Frederick J. Clarke in January 1946. DuPont would soon be gone too. The Manhattan District's original contract with DuPont was for the duration of the war plus six months thereafter. A supplemental agreement extended this to 30 June 1946, with an option to extend for a further year, which Groves exercised. Groves attempted to negotiate a long-term extension, but Carpenter declined. He agreed to remain until 31 October 1946, but he insisted that DuPont would walk away at that time. On 11 March 1946, Groves informed Patterson, who had succeeded Stimson as Secretary of War on 21 September 1945, that DuPont would have to be replaced. Because DuPont left before the term of the contract, the government asked for 33 cents of the one dollar fee back.

Possible replacement companies for DuPont were General Electric (GE) and Westinghouse Electric Corporation. Kenneth Nichols preferred GE as having more chemical capabilities than Westinghouse, but Groves thought GE would be too expensive, and it wanted support for a nuclear laboratory adjacent to its research center in Schenectady, New York. GE president Charles Wilson, was initially reluctant, but on 28 May 1946 he accepted the assignment. The contract stipulated that GE would operate the Hanford Engineer Works, design and construct alterations and additions, and conduct research and development incidental to the work at Hanford. It allowed GE to withdraw unilaterally if legislation before Congress to create the Atomic Energy Commission was not to its liking, and provided for the establishment of the Knolls Atomic Power Laboratory, a new government-owned laboratory where GE would conduct research and development. GE took over operations at Hanford on 1 September 1946, and accepted formal control on 30 September.

On 31 December 1946, the Manhattan Project ended and control of the Hanford Site passed to the Atomic Energy Commission. The total cost of the Hanford Engineer Works up to that time was $348,101,240 (equivalent to $4.38×10^{9} in 2025). The project had built 386 miles (621 km) of roads, 158 miles (254 km) of railway, and four electrical substations, with more than 50 miles (80 km) of transmission lines, and 780,000 cubic yards (600,000 m^{3}) of concrete and 40,000 short tons (36,000 t) of structural steel went into its construction.

During the Cold War, the Hanford Site facilities were expanded to include nine nuclear reactors and five large plutonium processing complexes that produced plutonium for most of the more than 60,000 weapons built for the US nuclear arsenal. After sufficient plutonium had been produced, the production reactors were shut down between 1964 and 1971. In 2000 large portions of the original site were turned over to the Hanford Reach National Monument. B Reactor was listed on the National Register of Historic Places in 1992. It was designated a National Historic Landmark by the National Park Service in 2008, and became part of the Manhattan Project National Historical Park alongside other sites at Oak Ridge and Los Alamos in 2015. The United States Department of Energy gives free guided tours of the site.
