= The Chemists' Club =

Private club in New York

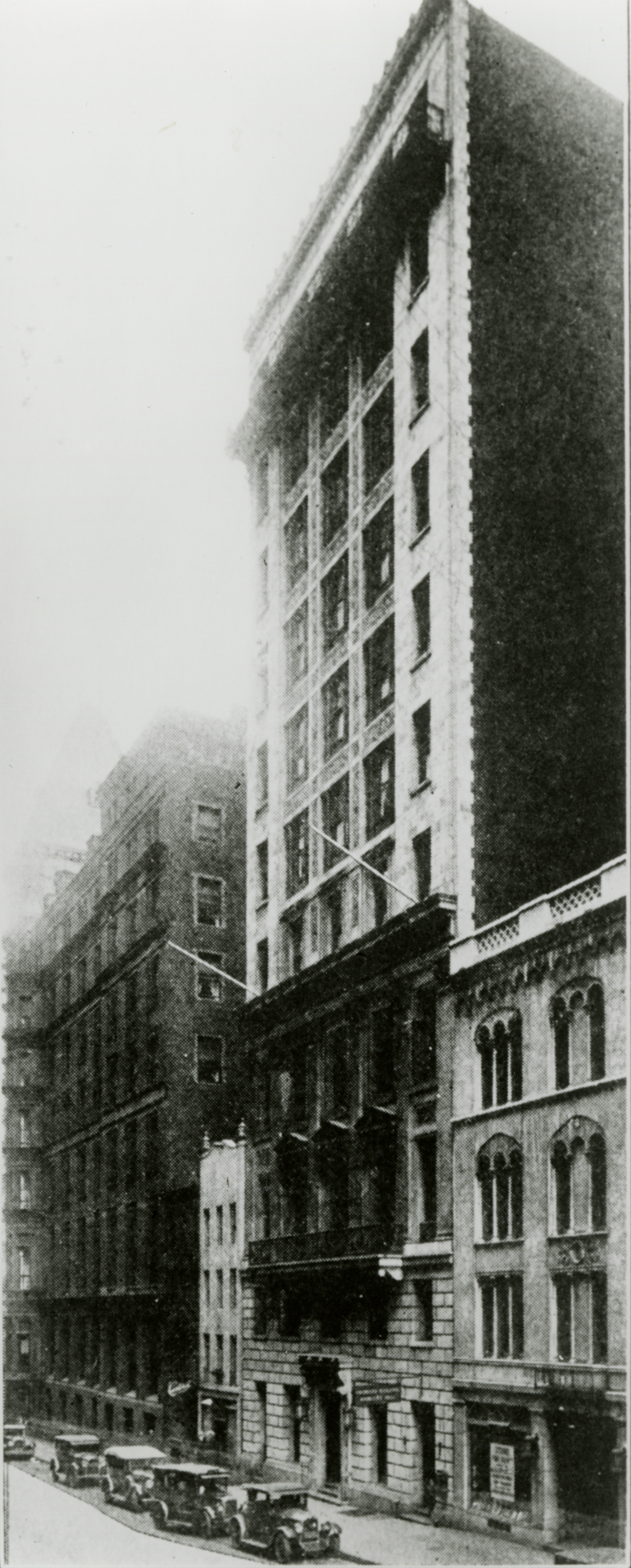
- Formation: December 12, 1898; 127 years ago
- Type: Private Club
- Legal status: Private Social Club
- Purpose: Hotel, Dining, Chemical laboratories, Meeting Space
- Location: 52 East 41st Street, New York City, New York, United States (1910-1980s)
- Region served: New York metropolitan area
- Website: www.thechemistsclub.org

The Chemists' Club is a private club in New York whose membership is open to research and industrial chemists from all areas. The Chemists' Club filed for incorporation on December 9, 1898. The Club's goal was "to promote the interests of chemists and those interested in the science and applications of chemistry", by providing academics and industrial chemists with space to meet, work, and study. It provided a place for members of various chemical societies to meet and mingle, including the American Chemical Society, the Society of Chemical Industry, the Verein Deutscher Chemiker, the American Electrochemical Society and the American Institute of Chemical Engineers (AIChE). The club is a 501(c)(3) Public Charity; in 2024 it reported total revenue of $228,482 and total assets of $58,186.

From 1910 to the 1980s, the Club was located at 52 East 41st Street, New York City. Built by the architects York and Sawyer, the 41st Street building contained areas for talks, meetings, and dinners, living and laboratory spaces that could be rented by members, and a world-class chemical research library. The New York Times called it “absolutely unique in the world”. The board room was a recreation of an alchemist's laboratory. Sold in the 1980s, and now the Dylan Hotel, the building has been proposed as an individual landmark by the New York Landmarks Conservancy.

== Formation ==
Before the club was founded in 1898, members of the American Chemical Society and the Society of Chemical Industry held events and meetings in homes, classrooms, and lecture halls, using whatever space was available. In 1898 Charles F. McKenna, William McMurtrie, Marston T. Bogert and others formed an organizational committee, and raised money to rent an available property at 108 West 55th Street. Committee chairperson Charles F. Chandler, a professor at Columbia University, donated $1000 to the fledgling organization and became its first president. As of November 29, 1898, the club had 154 charter members, including Leo Baekeland, Edward G. Love, William H. Nichols and Maximilian Toch. The Chemists' Club filed for incorporation on December 9, 1898. The papers were signed on December 24, 1898 and recorded on December 30, 1898.

== Locations ==
=== 108 West 55th Street ===
The club's first physical location was at 108 West 55th Street, previously the home of the Mendelssohn Glee Club. The space included a large assembly hall, reading rooms, and a small library. The club could not, however, secure a long-term lease on the property. The last meeting at the 55th Street location occurred on March 4, 1911.

=== 52 East 41st Street ===
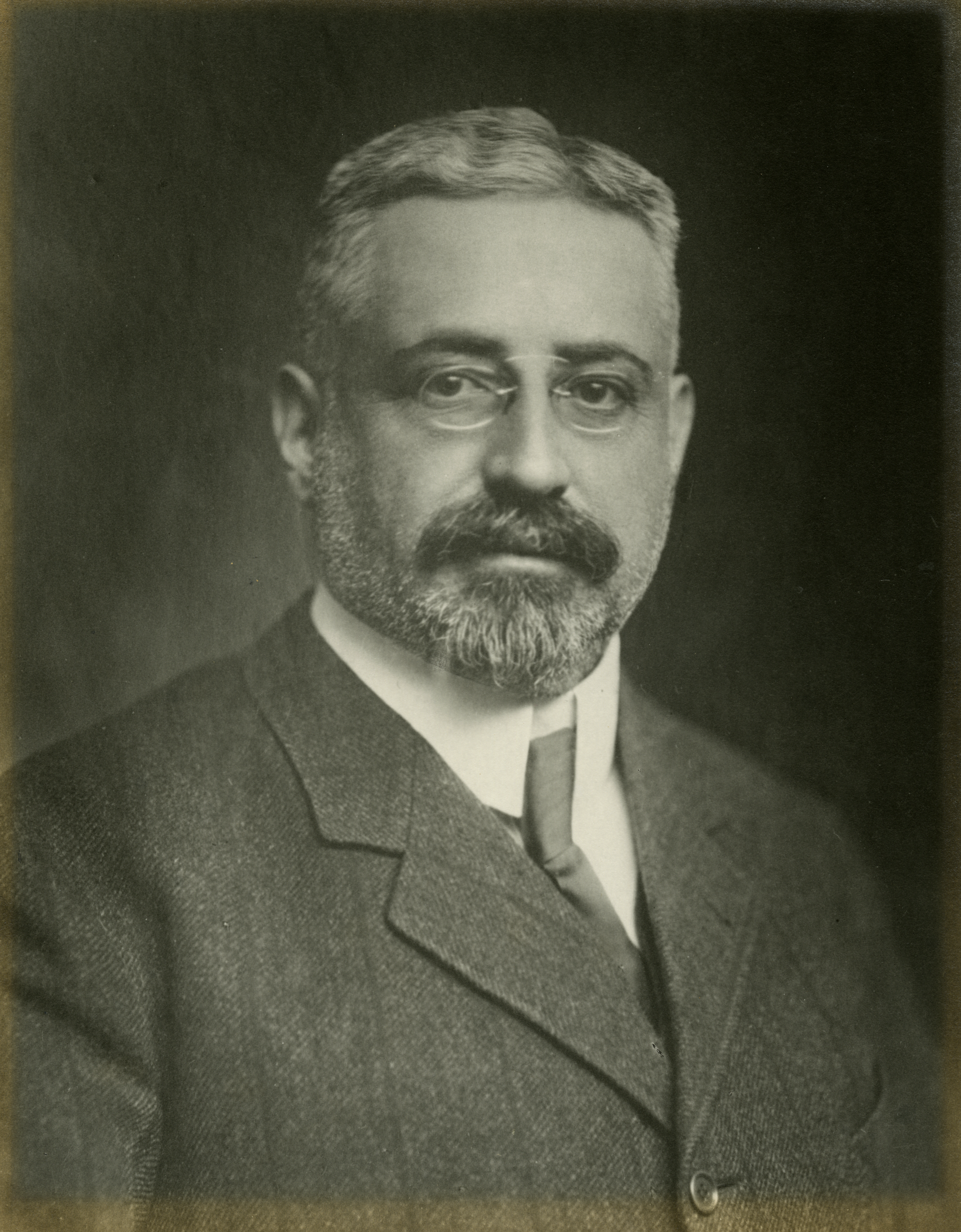
Morris Loeb, president, 1909-1910

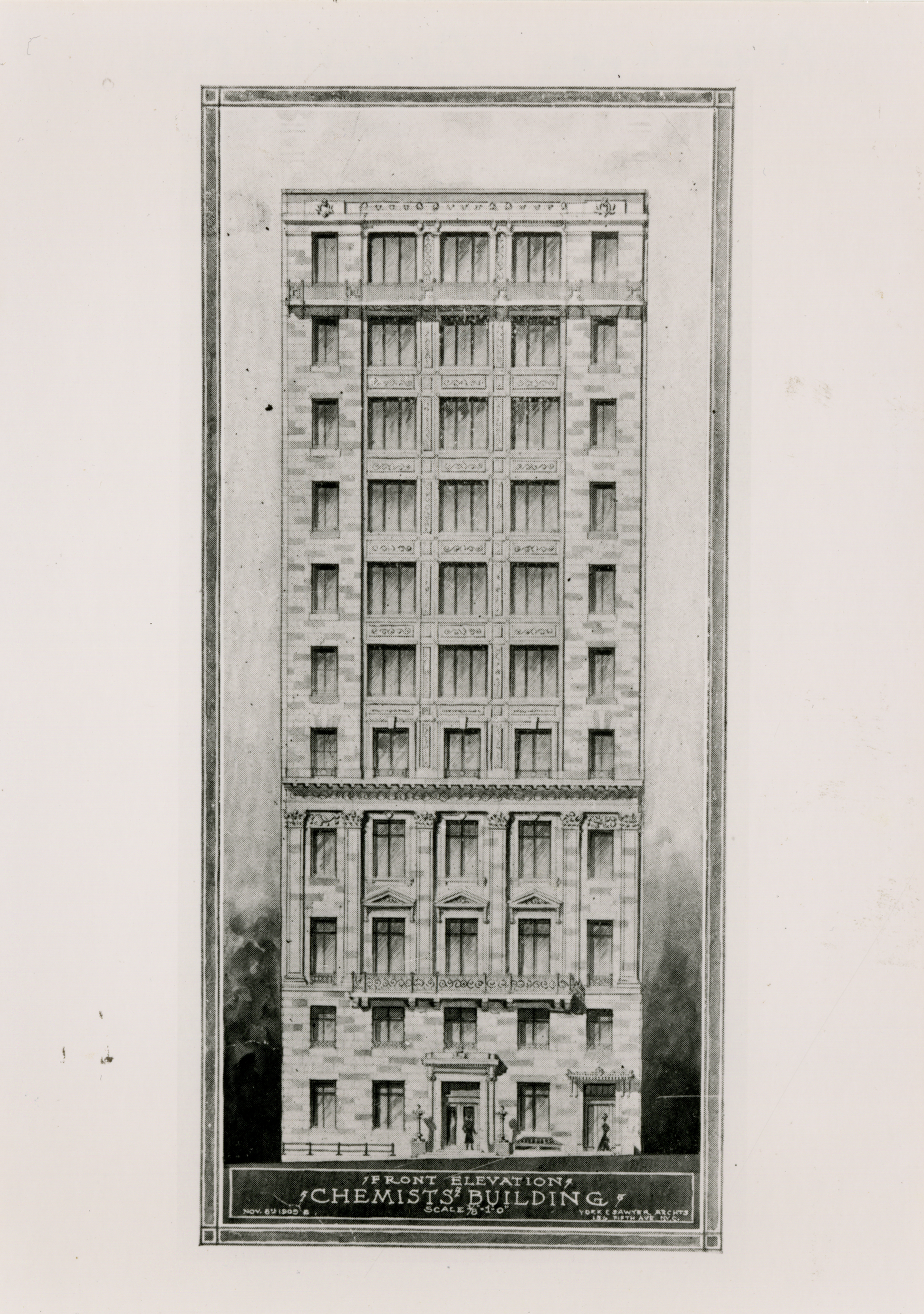
York and Sawyer front elevation, 1909

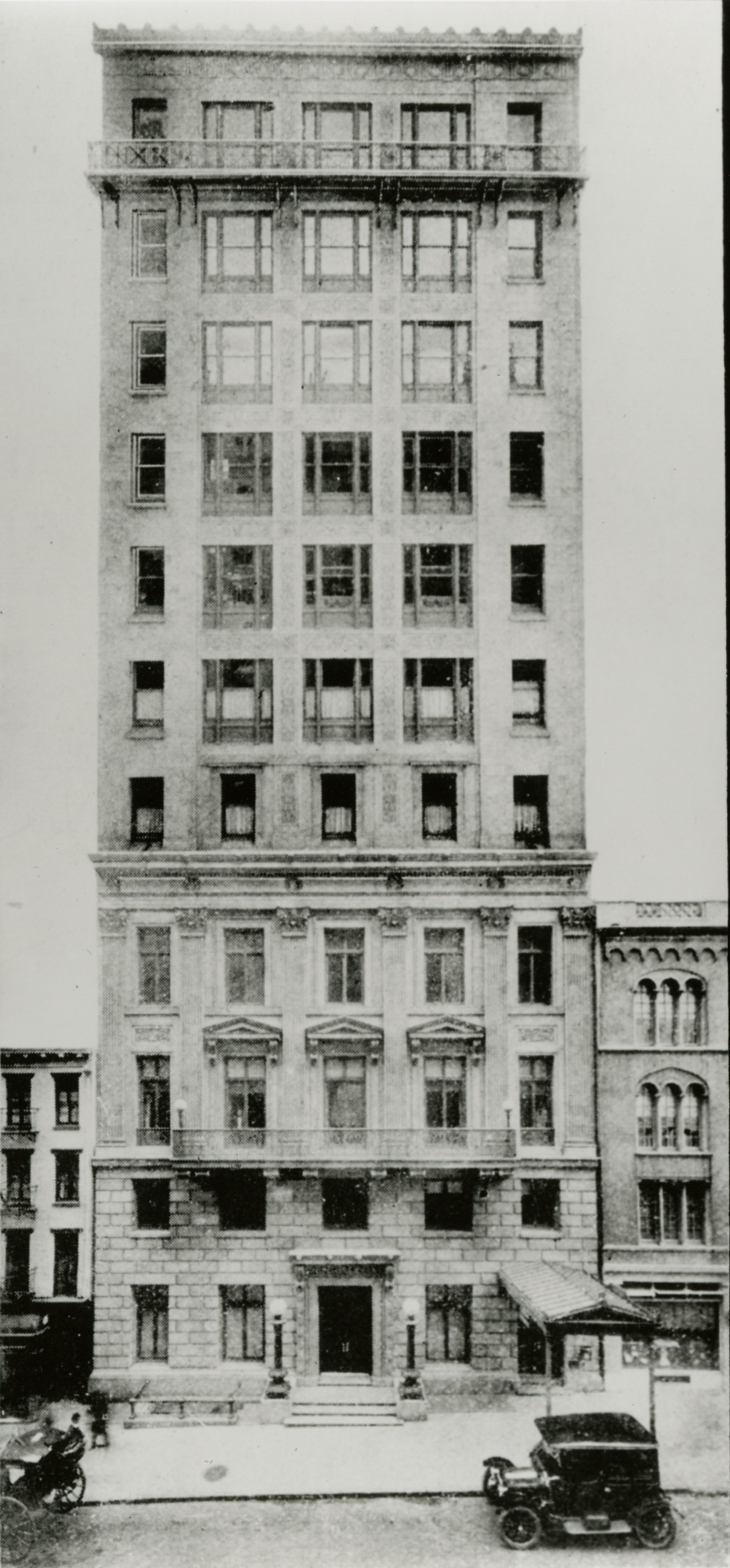
Completed in 1911

Morris Loeb, the club president in 1909, was a professor at New York University and a member of a wealthy New York banking family. He was determined to create a permanent space for the Chemists' Club, and actively campaigned to raise money for the project. When a suitable property was found, Loeb purchased it for $175,000, under his own name. The Chemists Building Company was subsequently formed, and sold shares of stock to help finance the project. These shares were later reclaimed through donation and purchase. Loeb personally donated $75,000 of the eventual $500,000 building fund. Sadly, Loeb died not long after the club building was completed. His death of typhoid fever and pneumonia, on October 8, 1912, was felt to be a great loss.

The Chemists' building at 52 East 41st Street, New York City, New York, United States was built by the architects York and Sawyer, replacing previous numbers 50-54. York and Sawyer filed the plans in January 1910 and completed the work in March 1911. The building opened on March 17, 1911. Several days of events were held to celebrate the opening. A number of scientific papers were presented, ranging from "The characteristics of living matter from the physico-chemical point of view" by Jacques Loeb to "The chemistry of phosphorescence" by Wilder Dwight Bancroft and "The contributions of chemistry to sanitation" by William P. Mason.

The resulting ten-story building was the home of the club from 1810 to the 1980s. The building was "an artistic structure of white marble, in the style of the French Renaissance of the Louis XVI period, finished with Ionic pilasters and balconies at the second story and similar decorative balconies at the top story.”

The New York Times called the building “absolutely unique in the world”. The first three floors of the club were meeting and social spaces. The main floor included a large auditorium with a balcony. The second floor included a dining room, a billiard room, and other social areas. The third floor housed the library and museum. The fourth and fifth floors were living spaces for members. Above that, five floors were allocated to laboratory space fitted out with scientific apparatus for the use of members. Members could rent living and working space for days, weeks or months, according to their needs. If they wished, they could live at the club while carrying out their research.

The organization was determined to make spaces available for those who would otherwise not have access to the resources they needed:

"for the young man whose income is still small, for the technical man who wants library facilities, for the teacher who is primarily interested in the scientific side of his work, and at the same time in retaining the interest and support of the business man, the executive and sales manager who wants a Club to which he is glad to bring his friends and business acquaintances."

To go with the new building, Loeb and others designed an emblem for the club. It included a hexagonal benzene ring for organic chemistry, crossed retorts for distillation, and a salamander surrounded by fire, in red and gold.

In 1988 the building was sold and eventually repurposed as the Dylan Hotel. The redesign has preserved many original features of the building, including the boardroom, which has been restored as the Alchemy Suite. The building has been proposed as an individual landmark by the New York Landmarks Conservancy.

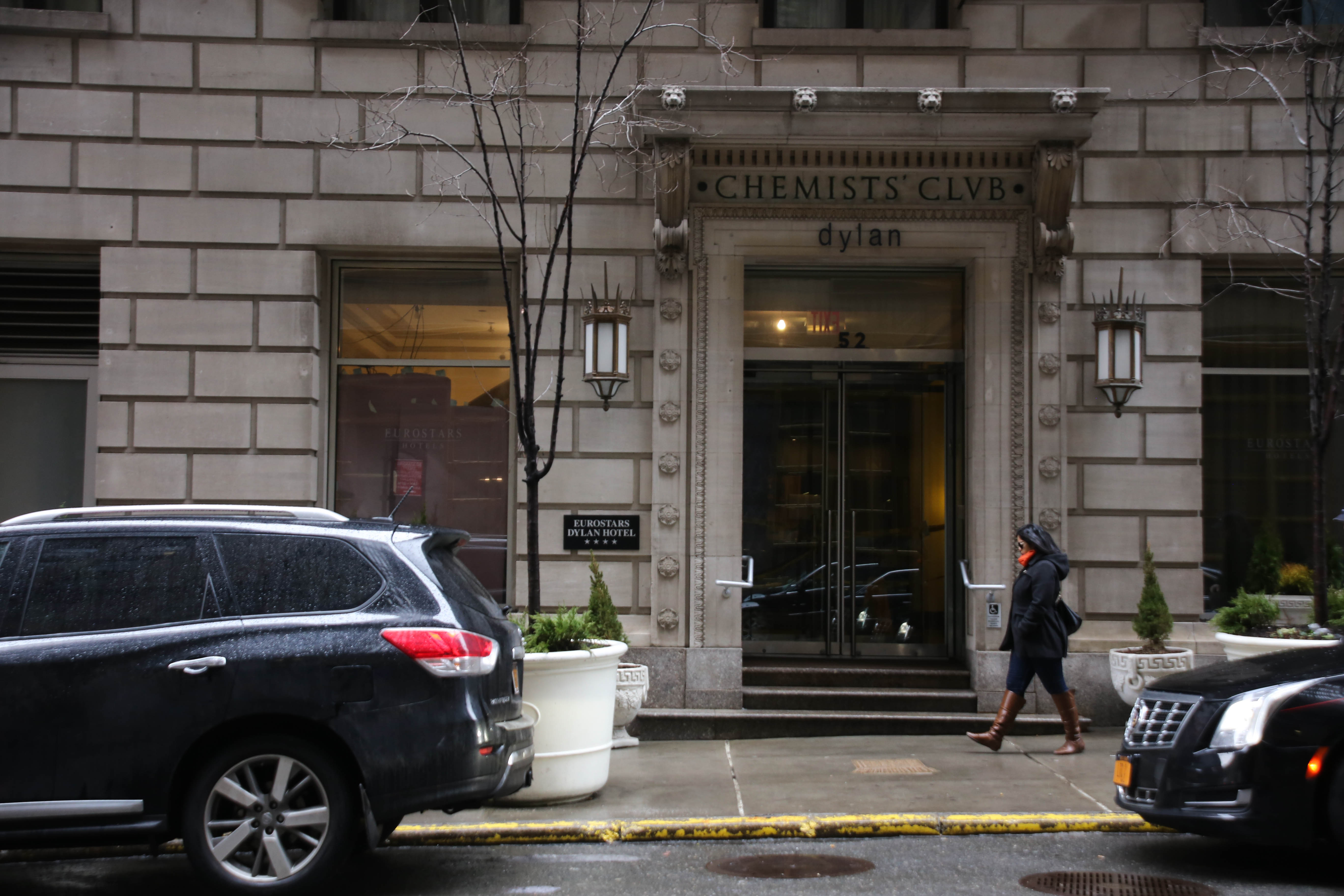
Dylan hotel, 2014

=== Penn Club ===
The Chemists' Club continues to meet as an "inner club" of the Penn Club of New York City. Members of the Chemists' Club are accepted at the Penn Club as members of an affiliate organization.

== Life at the Club ==
=== Membership ===
Residents of New York and area could become members of the Chemists' Club for $25 a year. Non-residents who had less opportunity to use the club's resources could join for $5. In 1909, the club listed around 400 members, more than half of them residents of New York. By the end of 1911, the year that the 41st Street building opened, membership of the society was over 1000. More than half of the members were non-residents of New York. By April 1, 1929, the club had filled the quota of 750 resident members established in its bylaws, and created a waiting list for resident members. The quota for non-resident members was initially 1000, but in later years both quotas were increased, and additional categories of members added. Special provision was made for lower fees for students and recent graduates.

=== Meetings and events ===
The club provided meeting space for the local branches of a variety of chemical organizations. The two founding organizations were the American Chemical Society (founded in 1876) and the New York section of the Society of Chemical Industry (founded in 1894). Members of the New York section of the Verein Deutscher Chemiker (founded in 1900), the American Electrochemical Society (founded in 1902) and the American Institute of Chemical Engineers (AIChE, founded in 1908) were also welcomed.

In addition to a wide variety of regular meetings, dinners, and other local events, the Club acted as a base for international events. In 1904, the Club hosted the first annual meeting of the London-based Society of Chemical Industry to be held outside Great Britain. On September 2, 1912, the club hosted attendees of the 8th International Congress of Applied Chemistry.

=== Accommodations ===
Eighteen rooms were available for rental in the main building at 41st street in 1911. When demand exceeded availability, those seeking accommodation were sent to the Murray Hill Hotel. A restaurant served the needs of residents and visitors at the Club. Later remodelling increased the number of available rooms.

=== Laboratories ===
The Club offered furnished laboratory space on a rental basis. An article in Industrial & Engineering Chemistry describes the need for such space:

"A chemist with his laboratory is not welcome as a tenant in modern, high class, centrally located and well equipped buildings, and, as a result, in most of the cities, and particularly in New York, the chemist and his laboratory are crowded into the less desirable sections of the city, and then only in the less desirable buildings."

Chemists were warned that there was a waiting list for those hoping to rent laboratory space at the Club.

=== Library ===
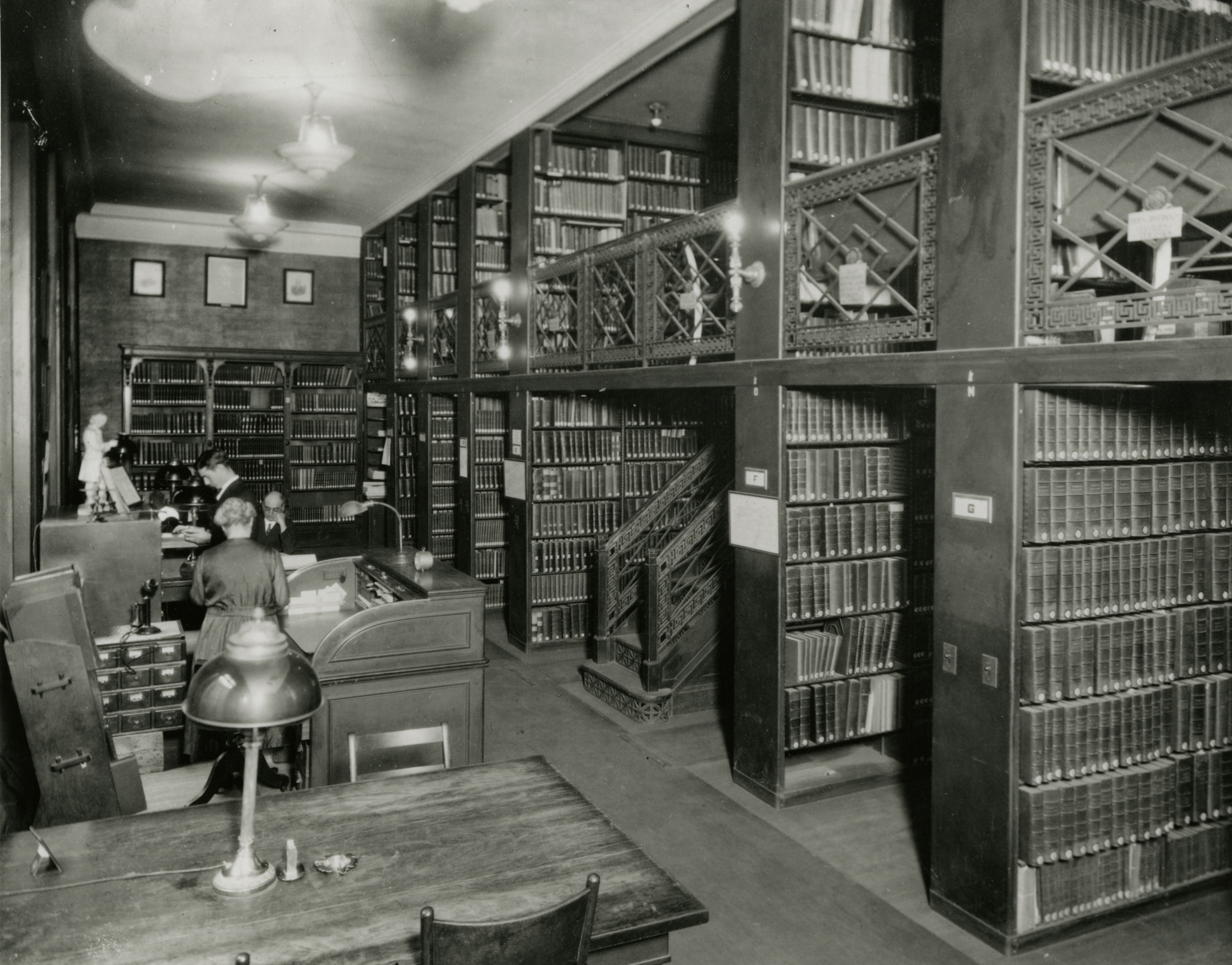
The Chemists Club library, Emily J. Fell, Evan J. Crane, Austin M. Patterson

A major impetus for forming the Club was the desire to house the library of the American Chemical Society and make the collection available to working chemists. For a time, the library had been located at the University Building, Washington Square, New York. When the University Building was demolished in 1894, the library went into storage. There was a strong desire to find it a new home.

Although the American Chemical Society’s library became a core collection of the Chemists' Club in 1912, the Chemists' Club's library also received donations from across the United States. Various funds supported the purchase of new materials. The library eventually absorbed a number of private collections including those of Charles F. Chandler, J. Meritt Matthews, John Mallet, Herman Frasch, Morris Loeb and Hugo Schweitzer. By 1913 the library was considered the largest chemical library in the country, and was opened to the public as well as to members. In 1914, it reportedly contained over 36,000 volumes and carried 400 journals. By 1928, it reportedly included 50,000 volumes.

With the sale of the Chemists' Club building, the library was sold off. Portions of the library were donated to the Othmer library of the Chemical Heritage Foundation (now the Science History Institute) in Philadelphia in 1988 and 1997.

=== Board room ===
The New York Times wrote of the club:

“One of the special features of the building is the board room, which has been fashioned to represent a laboratory in the days of alchemy” with “vaulted roof, flag-stoned floor, iron-bound chest, high writing desk—even the fireplace with strange black pots and alembics upon it, and, overhead, just outside the door, a winding stone stairway just like those by which the wizards of the black arts used to steal away from prying eyes to juggle with fire and crucibles, transmute base metals to gold, conjure up devils, and otherwise qualify for execution at the hands of the public hangman.”

Another feature of the room was the stuffed alligator hanging from the ceiling, in homage to the alchemists' iconographic salamander, which could live in fire without burning.

=== Services ===
Beginning November 15, 1909, a monthly newsletter, The Percolator, informed members of activities and events. The club was the initiator of a variety of services. A Chemists employment bureau was established in 1904, and incorporated in 1913. It remained active until 1944. In response to the Depression, a Committee for the Relief of Unemployed Chemists and Chemical Engineers opened an office at the club in 1932.

== Gender desegregation ==
For much of its history, in practice and at times by definition, membership in the Chemists' Club was open only to "male persons". Women were allowed to enter the premises as guests of members.

However, the club was not entirely unsympathetic to women chemists. In 1921, the Club's Bureau of Employment expressed concern, in its yearly report, that women chemists were being laid off in the wake of World War I.

"Another phase repeatedly brought to our notice is the decrease in willingness to consider the employment of woman chemists. This is unfortunate. Those who have employed them report that they are uniformly satisfactory and in some ways more desirable than men, especially for routine work."

In 1971, the Chemists' Club was opened to women members. The first woman to be accepted as a member of the Chemists' Club was Hazel Bishop. Bishop was an industrial chemist, who had developed Hazel Bishop cosmetics. The second woman to join was E. Janet Berry, a chemist and expert in patent law who became a member of the Club's board of directors.

== Presidents of the Chemists' Club ==
- Charles F. Chandler, 1898-1900
- T. J. Parker, 1901
- Edward G. Love, 1902
- William McMurtrie, 1903
- Leo H. Baekeland, 1904
- Hugo Schweitzer, 1905
- William Jay Schieffelin, 1906
- Maximilian Toch, 1907
- Marston T. Bogert, 1908
- Morris Loeb, 1909
- I. Frank Stone, 1910
- Russell Wellman Moore, 1911
- Morris Loeb, 1912
- Otto P. Amend, 1913
- Charles F. McKenna, 1914
- Milton C. Whitaker, 1915-1917
- Ellwood Hendrick, 1918-1920
- John E. Teeple, 1921-1922
- Floyd J. Metzger, 1923-1924
- Kenneth G. Mackenzie, 1925
- Theodore B. Wagner, 1926-1928
- Lawrence V. Redman, 1929-1931
- George C. Lewis, 1931-1933
- Lewis H. Marks, 1933-1934
- Martin H. Ittner, 1935
- Frederick G. Zinsser, 1936
- William Callan, 1937-1938
- Frederick M. Becket, 1939-1940
- Walter S. Landis, 1941-1942
- Carl R. DeLong, 1943
- Charles R. Downs, 1944
- Wallace P. Cahoe, 1945-1947
- Frank E. Barrows, 1948-1949
- Harold E. Thompson, 1950-1951
- William F. George, 1952-1953
- Ira Vandewater, 1954-1955
- Lee V. Steck, 1950-1958
- Howard Farkas, 1958-1960
- Lincoln T. Work, 1960-1962
- Foster Dee Snell, 1962-1964
- Robert L. Bateman, 1964-1966
- F. J. Van Antwerpen, 1966-1968
- Fred J. Emmerich, 1968-1970
- James A. Wilson, 1970-1972
- Charles E. Griffith, 1972-1974
- Donald F. Othmer, 1974-1976
- Samuel F. Teague, 1976-1978
- Robert J. Milano, 1978-1982
- Robert H. Kampschulte, 1982-1983
- L. John Polite, Jr., 1983-1987
- Paul L. Kohnstamm, 1987-1989
- L. John Polite, Jr., 1989-1998
- Roland Stefandl, 1998-
Selected Presidents of the Chemists' Club

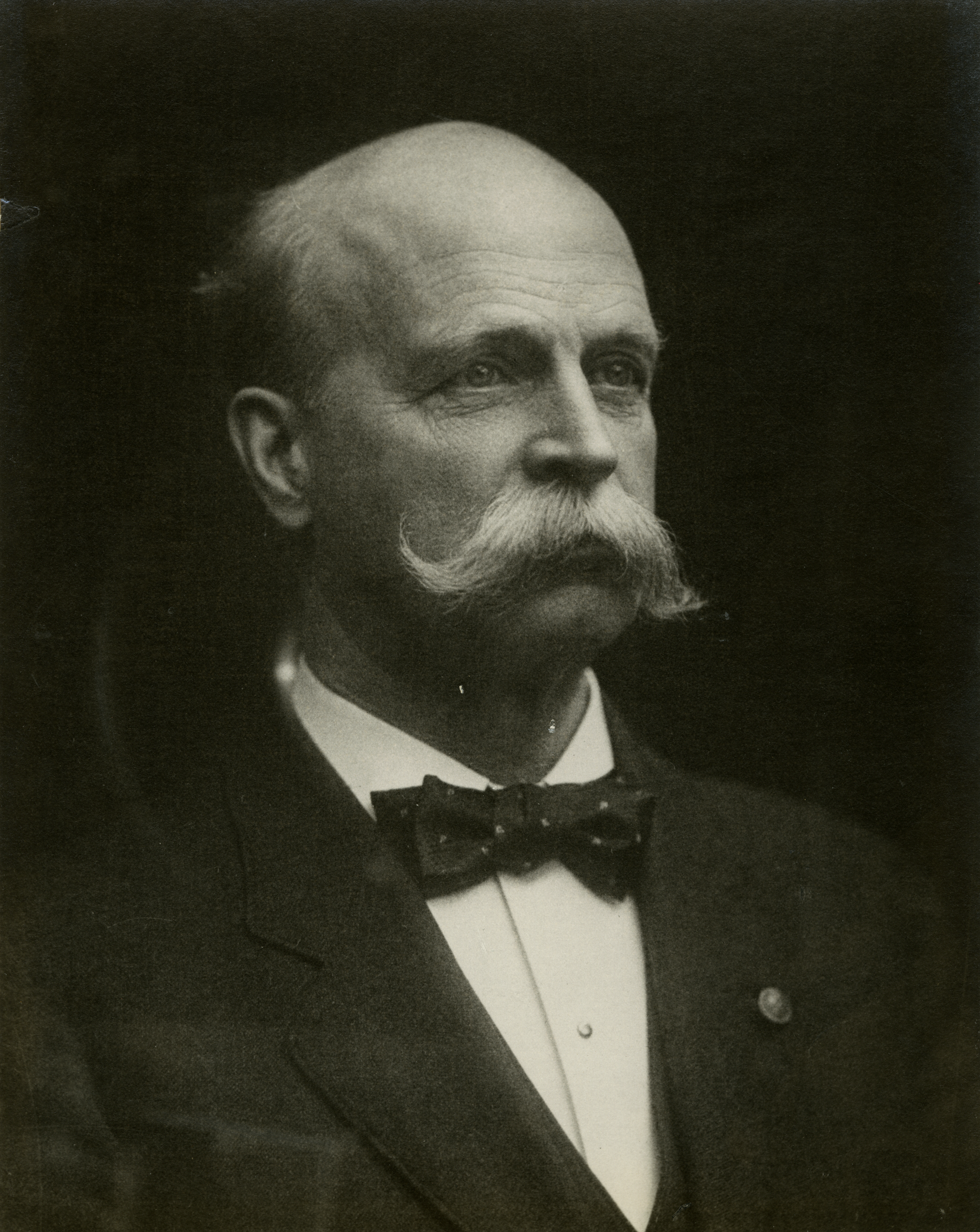
Edward G. Love, Chemists' Club President 1902-1903

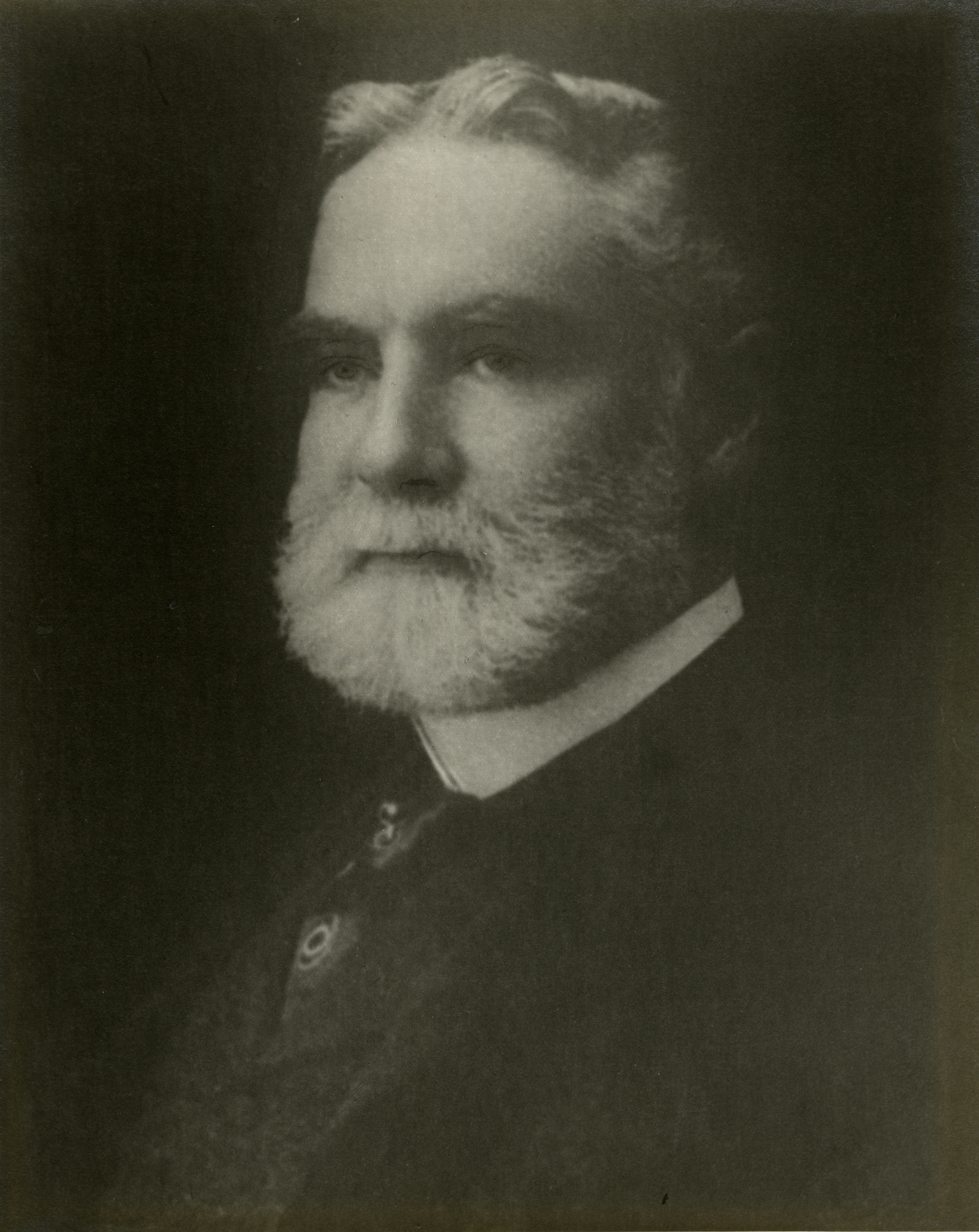
William McMurtrie, Chemists' Club President 1903-1904

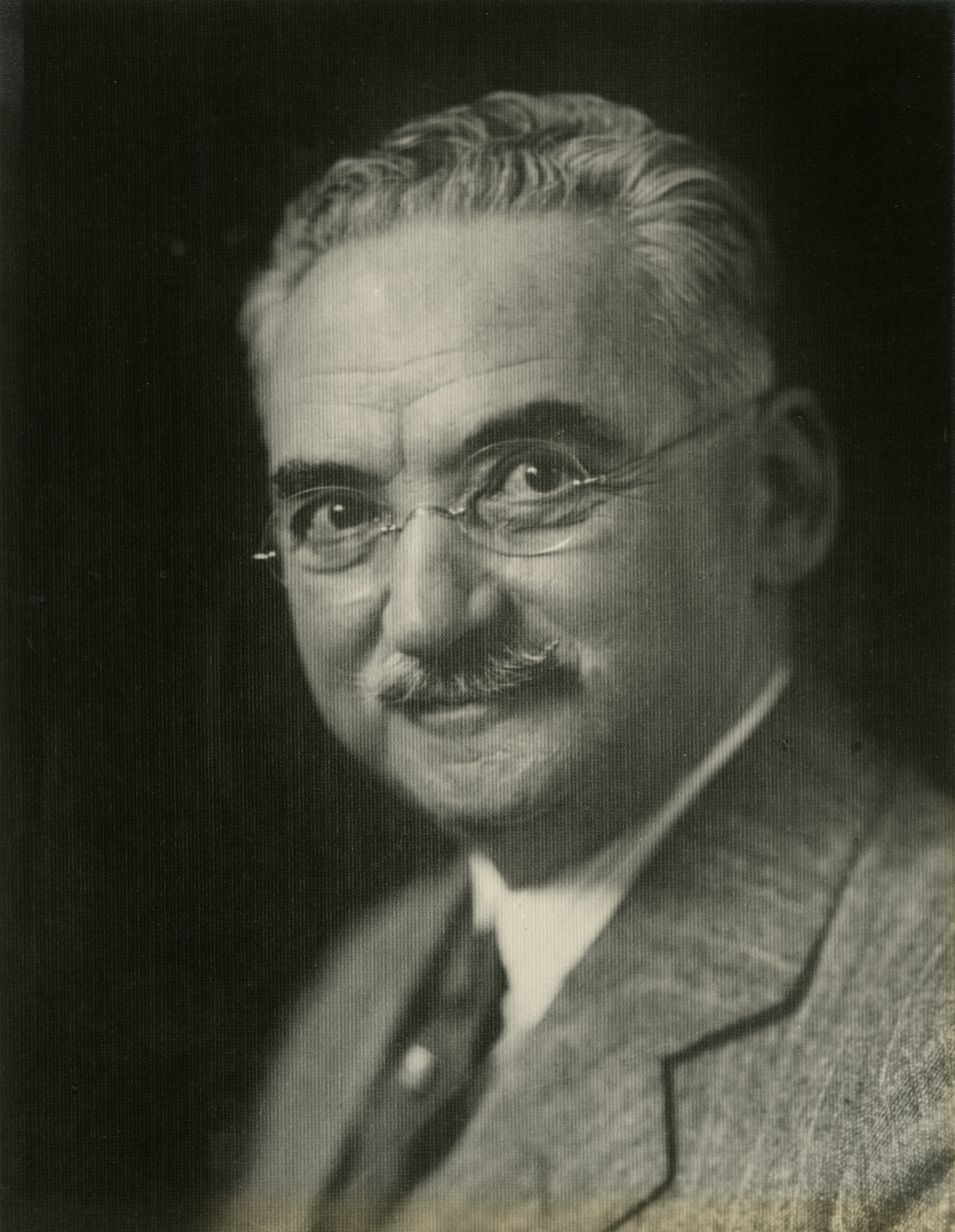
Maximilian Toch, Chemists' Club President 1907

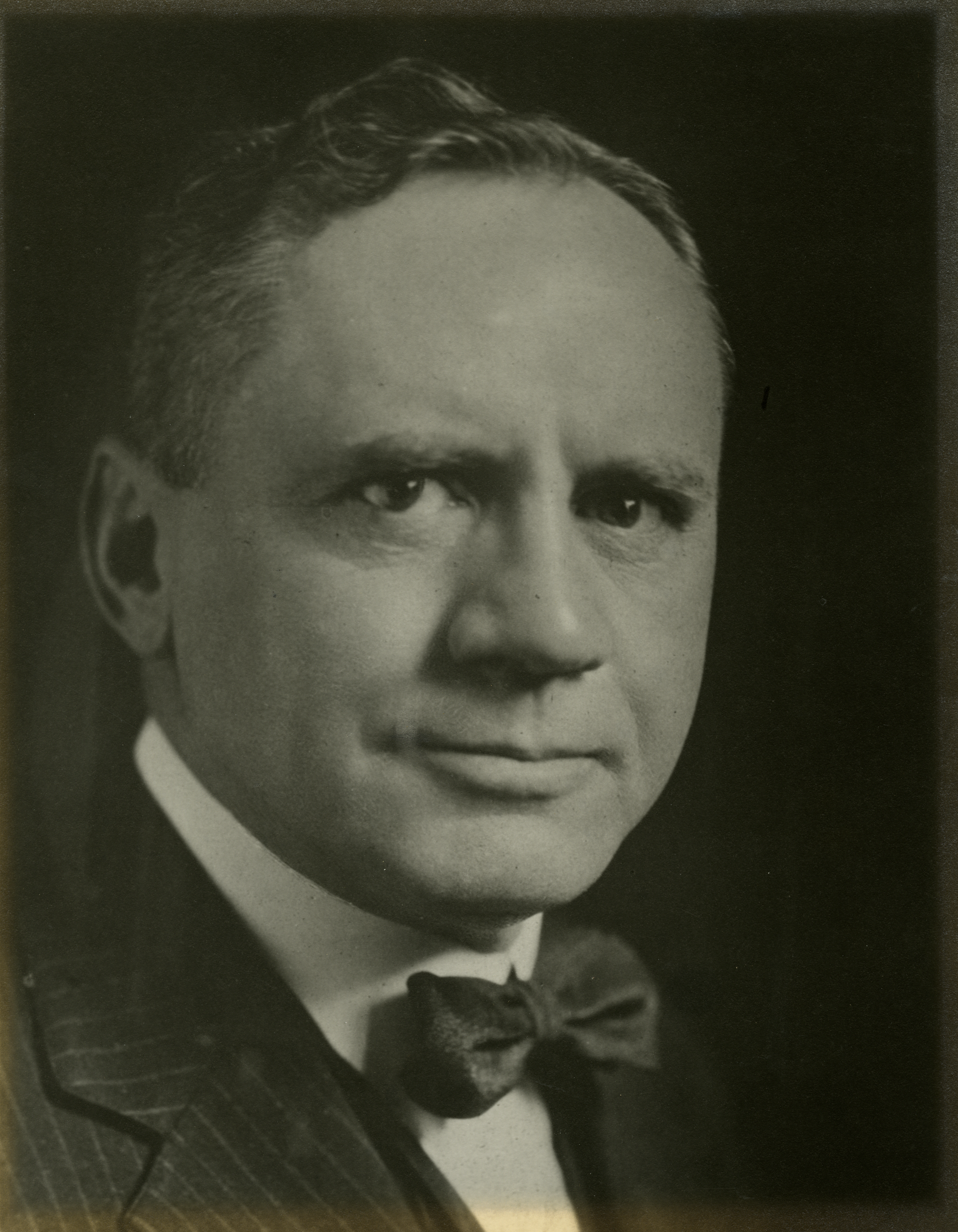
John E. Teeple, Chemists' Club President 1921-1922
