= Ittner =

Ittner is a surname. Notable people with the surname include:

- Alfred Ittner (1907–1976), SS functionary of Nazi Germany
- Anthony F. Ittner (1837–1931), US-politician and brick manufacturer
- Chester Ittner Bliss (1899–1979), American statistician
- Eva-Maria Ittner (born 1961), German fencer
- Martin Ittner (1870–1945), American chemist
- William B. Ittner (1864–1936), American architect
