= Carman Newcomb =

American politician (1830–1902)

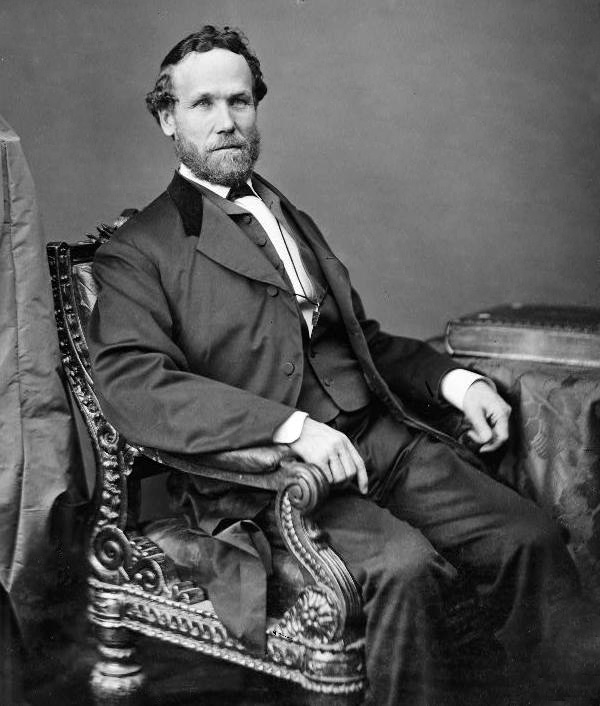

Member of the U.S. House of Representatives from Missouri's 2nd district
- In office March 4, 1867 – March 3, 1869
- Preceded by: Henry T. Blow
- Succeeded by: Gustavus Finkelnburg

Member of the Missouri House of Representatives
- In office 1865–1866

Personal details
- Born: Carman Adam Newcomb; July 1, 1830 Mercer, Pennsylvania, US
- Died: April 6, 1902 (aged 71) St. Louis, Missouri, US
- Party: Republican
- Profession: Politician, lawyer, judge, U.S. marshal

Carman Adam Newcomb (erroneously Carmen and Adams; July 1, 1830 – April 6, 1902) was an American politician, lawyer, judge and marshal from Iowa and Missouri.

== Biography ==
Newcomb was born on July 1, 1930, in Mercer, Pennsylvania. After completing his studies, he moved to Kentucky. He later moved to Shreveport, Louisiana, where he studied law and was admitted to the bar. He moved again to West Union, Iowa in 1854 and commenced practicing law. He was judge of the circuit court of Fayette County, Iowa, from 1855 to 1860.

During the American Civil War, Newcomb served as captain of Company F in the 3rd Iowa Infantry Regiment, from 1861 until his discharge on account of illness in 1862. He then moved to Vineland, Missouri and resumed practicing law. He was a member of the Missouri House of Representatives in 1865 and 1866, and was elected a Republican to the United States House of Representatives in 1866, serving from 1867 to 1869, not being a candidate for renomination in 1868. As a politician, he supported the ratification of the United States Declaration of Independence into law in order to achieve equality. In February 1868, he proposed to the United States House Committee on Ways and Means that the United States Capitol be moved to St. Louis.

Afterward, Newcomb was a United States Marshal for the eastern district of Missouri from 1869 to 1875, was census enumerator of St. Louis in 1870, then resumed practicing law.

Newcomb died in on April 6, 1902, aged 71, in St. Louis. He was cremated, the ashes being held at the Missouri Crematory. His son was lawyer Carman Adam Newcomb Jr., who represented George Skakel. His granddaughter is publicist and producer Patricia Newcomb

U.S. House of Representatives
Preceded by Henry T. Blow	Member of the U.S. House of Representatives from Missouri's 2nd congressional district March 4, 1867 – March 3, 1869	Succeeded by Gustavus Finkelnburg
