= Missouri Crematory =

Funeral facility in St. Louis County, Missouri

Coordinates: 38°41′25″N 90°19′15″W

- Interactive map of the Missouri Crematory area

General information
- Type: Crematory
- Location: Missouri, U.S.

The Missouri Crematory (also known as Hillcrest Abbey Crematory and Mausoleum, Missouri Crematory and Columbarium and Valhalla Hillcrest Abbey Crematory) was the sixth modern crematory built in the United States and holds the distinction of being the first crematory built west of the Mississippi River. The crematory is located at 3211 Sublette Avenue in St. Louis, just across from the State Mental Hospital off of Arsenal Street. Now called "Valhalla's Hillcrest Abbey" it is owned by the Zell Family, who also own the Valhalla Chapel and Memorial Park on St. Charles Rock Road.

== Notable interments ==
- Pvt William Giles Hills (1841–1912), American Civil War Medal of Honor recipient
- Edward C. Kehr (1837–1918), US Representative
- Carman A. Newcomb (1830–1902), US Representative
- Walter Scott (1943–1983), singer
- Paul Tietjens (1877–1943) composer

== Gallery ==
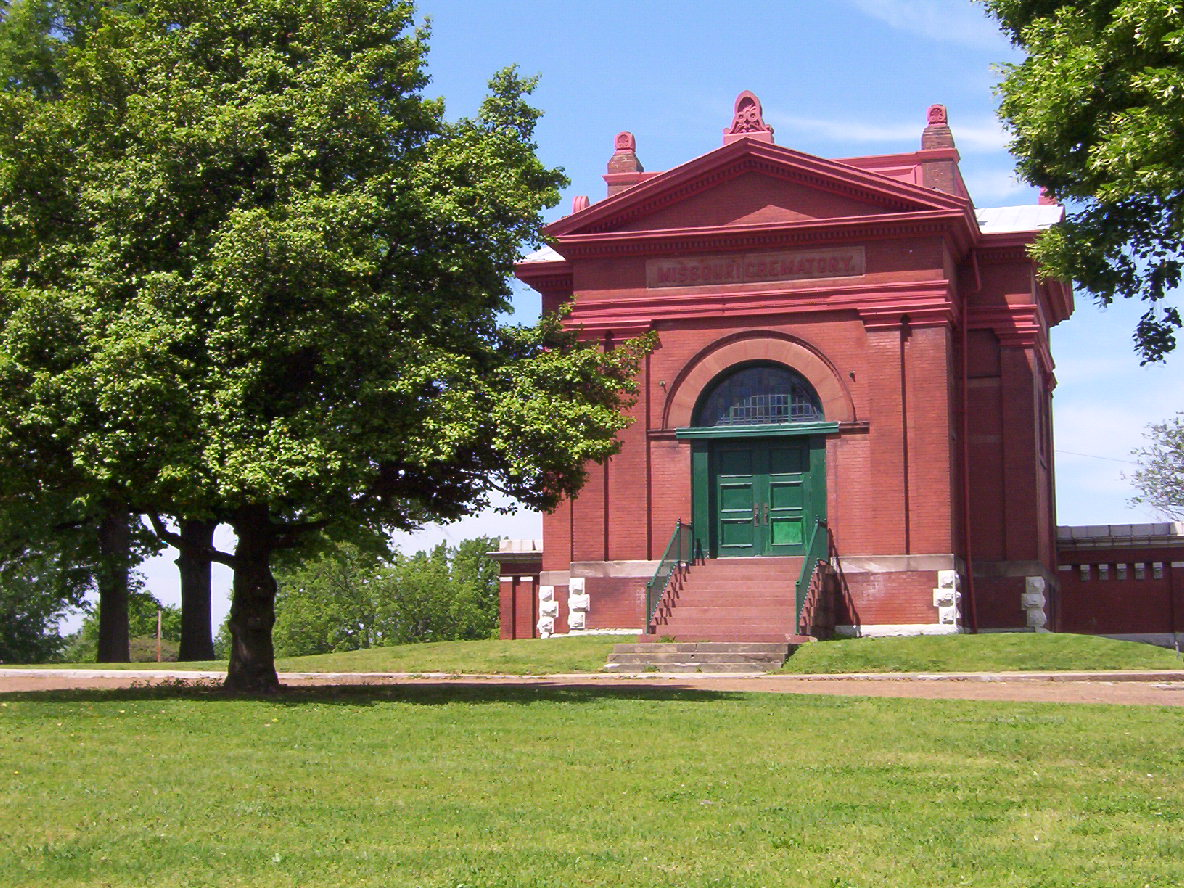
The Missouri Crematory.

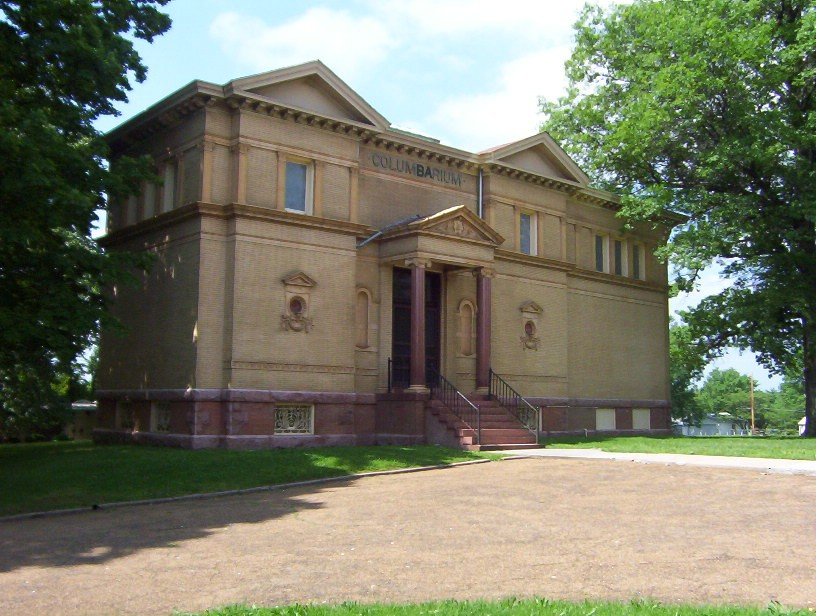
The Columbarium of the Missouri Crematory.

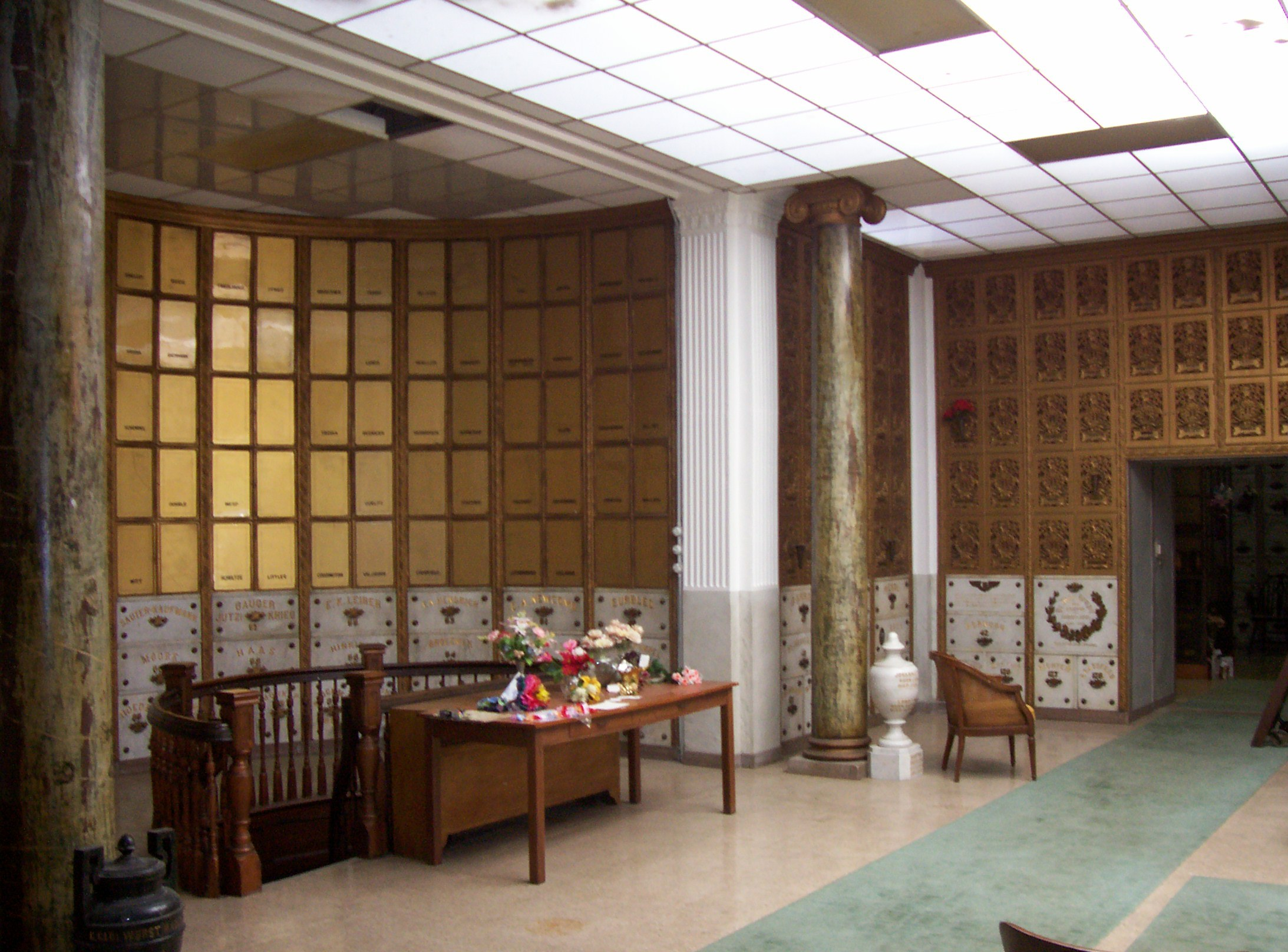
The interior of the Columbarium of the Missouri Crematory.
