= John E. Teeple =

John Edgar Teeple
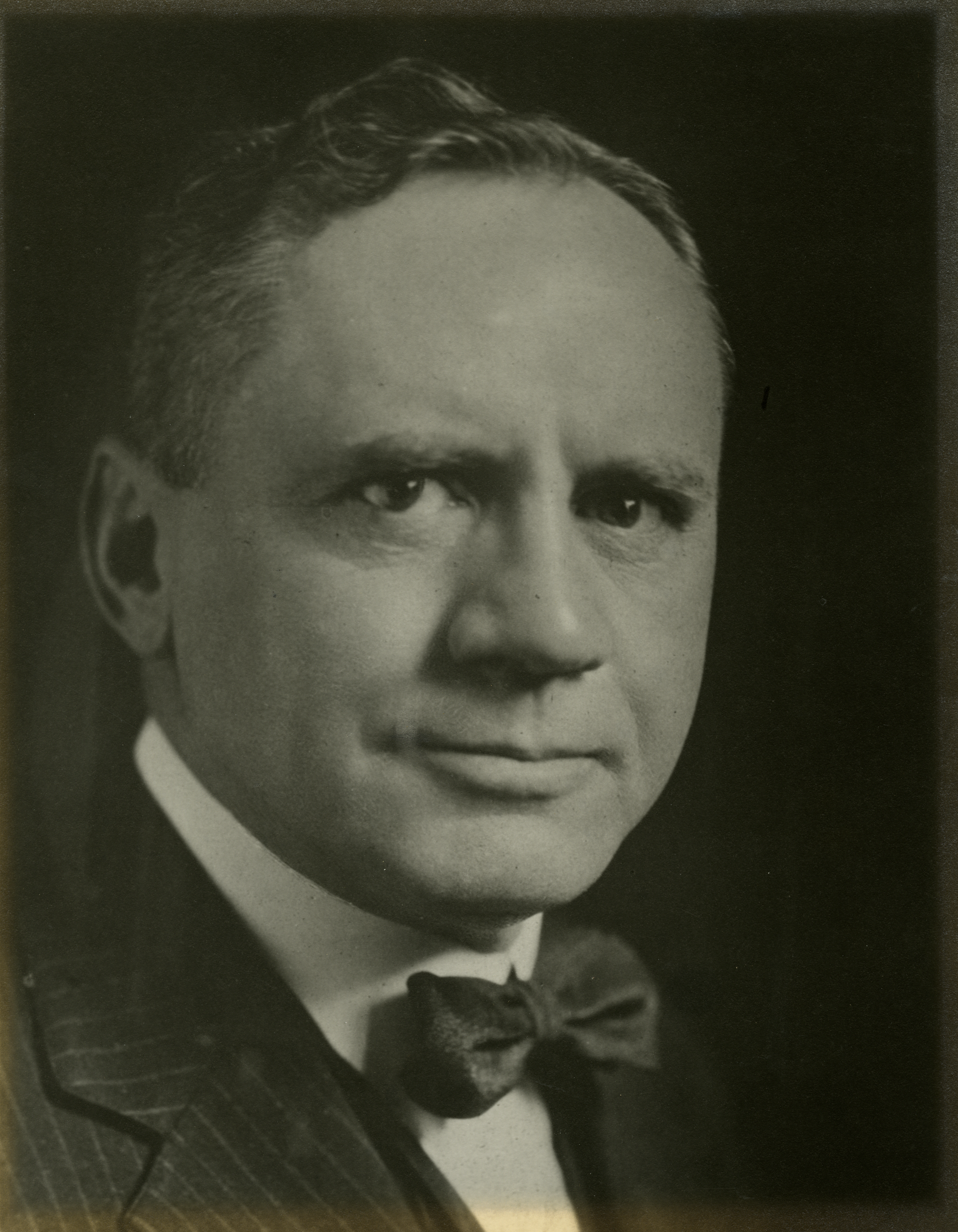
- President of the Chemists Club, 1921-1922
- Born: January 4, 1874; Kempton, Illinois, U.S.
- Died: May 28, 1931 (aged 57); New York City, New York, U.S.
- Education: Valparaiso University, Cornell University
- Spouse: Lina Pease
- Scientific career
- Fields: Chemical engineer

John Edgar Teeple (January 4, 1874 – March 23, 1931) was an American chemical engineer who served as President of The Chemists' Club from 1921-1922 and received the Perkin Medal in 1927 for his work on potash during World War I.

He was also a researcher and contributor to the field of Mesoamerican studies during the first half of the 20th century. He published several papers on the epigraphy and astronomy of the pre-Columbian Maya civilization, and he is most noted for being the first to decipher the nature and meaning of the series of glyphs in the Maya writing system known as the "Supplementary Series", proving they referred to the position of a given day in the lunar cycle.

The mathematically adept Teeple was encouraged into the field of Maya studies by his friend, the Mesoamerican scholar Sylvanus G. Morley, one of the foremost Mayanist researchers of his day. By this time (the mid-1920s), although a few details relating to the functioning of the Maya calendar system and some astronomical notation had been worked out, the great majority of ancient Maya inscriptions and glyphs remained mysterious and undeciphered.
