= Anthony F. Ittner =

American politician and businessman (1837–1931)

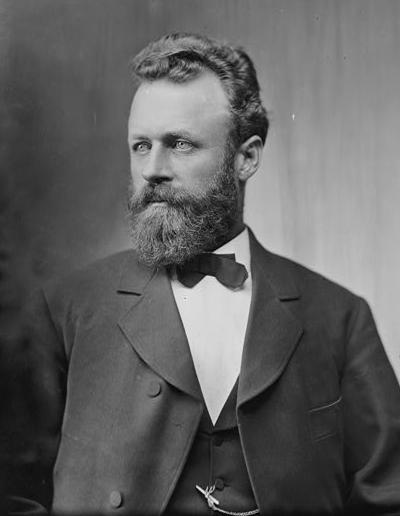

Member of the U.S. House of Representatives from Missouri's 1st district
- In office March 4, 1877 – March 3, 1879
- Preceded by: Edward C. Kehr
- Succeeded by: Martin L. Clardy

Member of the Missouri Senate from the 30th district
- In office 1870 – November 1876
- Preceded by: John S. Cavender
- Succeeded by: W. S. Pope

Member of the Missouri House of Representatives
- In office 1868–1870

Personal details
- Born: October 8, 1837 Lebanon, Ohio, US
- Died: February 22, 1931 (aged 93) St. Louis, Missouri, US
- Party: Republican
- Relations: Martin Ittner (nephew)
- Children: 6, including William
- Occupation: Politician, businessman

Anthony Friday Ittner (October 8, 1837 – February 22, 1931) was an American politician and businessman. A Republican, he was a member of the United States House of Representatives from Missouri.

== Early life ==
Ittner was born on October 8, 1837, in Lebanon, Ohio. His father was John Ittner, a German immigrant, and his mother was Mary Ittner, a Portuguese immigrant. In 1844, he and his parents moved to St. Louis, where he attended its common schools.

== Career ==
At age nine, Ittner was employed at a lead factory, and at age 12, at a brickyard. He later cofounded a brick manufacturing company, alongside his brother Conrad S. Ittner. He served as president of the National Association of Home Builders and the National Brick Manufacturers' Association. During the American Civil War, he served in the Missouri Militia.

Ittner was a Democrat. He served on the St. Louis Board of Aldermen in 1867 and 1868. He was a member of the Missouri House of Representatives from 1868 to 1870. He then representing the Missouri's 30th district in the state senate from 1868 to 1870. He resigned from the Senate to serve in the United States House of Representatives. Representing Missouri's 1st district, he served from March 4, 1877, to March 3, 1879. He refused to run in the following election.

After serving in Congress, Ittner returned to brick manufracturing. He retired in 1917. He was also a board member of State Historical Society of Missouri and helped to organize the Louisiana Purchase Exposition.

== Personal life and death ==
Ittner was married to Mary Butts Ittner. He had six children, including architect William B. Ittner. From 1864, he was a member of the Independent Order of Odd Fellows. He died on February 22, 1931, aged 93, in St. Louis, from pneumonia. He was buried at Bellefontaine Cemetery. His nephew was chemist Martin Ittner.

U.S. House of Representatives
Preceded by Edward C. Kehr	Member of the U.S. House of Representatives from Missouri's 1st congressional district March 4, 1877 – March 3, 1879	Succeeded by Martin L. Clardy
