= Edward C. Kehr =

American politician and lawyer (1837–1918)

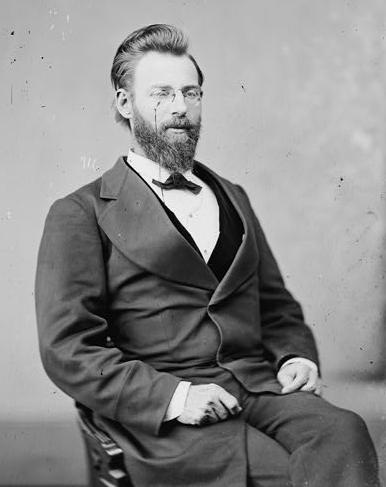

Member of the U.S. House of Representatives from Missouri's 1st district
- In office March 4, 1875 – March 3, 1877
- Preceded by: Edwin O. Stanard
- Succeeded by: Anthony F. Ittner

Member of the St. Louis Board of Aldermen
- In office 1879–1893

Personal details
- Born: Edward Charles Kehr; November 5, 1837 St. Louis, Missouri, US
- Died: April 20, 1918 (aged 80) St. Louis, Missouri, US
- Party: Democratic
- Profession: Politician, lawyer

Edward Charles Kehr (November 5, 1837 – April 20, 1918) was an American politician and lawyer. A Democrat, he was a member of the United States House of Representatives from Missouri.

== Early life and education ==
Kehr was born on November 5, 1837, in St. Louis, the son of German immigrants Adolph Kher and Eliza (née Zoller) Kher. He received an extensive education and read law under Christian Kribben, who went on to become Speaker of the Missouri House of Representatives.

== Career ==
Kher was admitted to the bar on February 18, 1858, after which he commenced practice in St. Louis. During the American Civil War, he served in the Union army for three months during 1861. In December 1875, he formed the partnership Tittmann and Kher alongside Eugene C. Tittmann. By 1906, was the oldest law partnership in St. Louis. His law office was situated in the Wainwright Building. For a time he was president of the St. Louis Bar Association.

Kher was a Democrat. He rose to political prominence during the Panic of 1873 for his advocation of conservative solutions to the crisis. He also supported hard money, home rule, and tariffs. He served in the United States House of Representatives from March 4, 1875, to March 3, 1877, representing Missouri's 1st district. He lost the following primaries. From 1879 to 1893, he was a member of the St. Louis Board of Aldermen, serving as the board's president for two of those years.

After serving in Congress, Kher returned to practicing law in St. Louis. He held extensive real estate. In 1918, he and surveyor Julius Pitzman had discussed jointly purchasing Cahokia. After his death, his estate stated they retained interest, though the purchase was never made.

== Personal life and death ==
Kher was Protestant. He never married. He died on April 20, 1918, aged 80, in St. Louis, from a stroke caused by apoplexy. He was cremated, his ashes being held at the Missouri Crematory.

U.S. House of Representatives
Preceded by Edwin O. Stanard	Member of the U.S. House of Representatives from Missouri's 1st congressional district March 4, 1875 – March 3, 1877	Succeeded by Anthony F. Ittner
