= Maya calendar =

Calendar used in pre-Columbian Mesoamerica

Today (at UTC+00)
- Wednesday, 14 October 2026
- Maya: 13.0.14.0.5; 18 Yax, 5 Chicchan
Other calendars
Akan	Fowukuo
Armenian	26 Sahmi 1476
Aztec	Izcalli 12, 5 Cōātl
Babylonian	1 Tashritu, 2337 SE
Balinese pawukon	Luang, Pepet, Pasah, Jaya, Wage, Tungleh, Buda of Kelawu, Kala, Dangu, Pati
Bengali	29 Ashshin, BS 1433
Chinese	Yin Metal Rooster・Chariot Mansion; Fire Horse Year, Month 9, Day 5 (Hanlu, 9 days until Shuangjiang)
Common Era	14 October 2026 CE
Coptic	4 Paopi, AM 1743
Egyptian	1 Phamenoth, 2775 NE
Ethiopian	4 Ṭeqemt, 2019 Amätä Məhrät
French Republican	Décade III, Duodi de Vendémiaire de l'Année 235 de la République
Gregorian	14 October, AD 2026
Hebrew	3 Cheshvan, AM 5787
Hindu	Anurādhā・Ayuṣmān; Solar: 28 Āśvina, 1948 SE; Lunisolar: Caturthī, Śukla pakṣa of Āśvina, 2083 VE; Rāudra・5127 KY・1,872,862
Icelandic	Miðvikudagur, 21 Haustmánuður 2026
Islamic	2 Jumada al-awwal, AH 1448 (using tabular method)
ISO week date	2026-W42-3
Japanese	4 Nagatsuki, Reiwa 8 (Kanro, 9 days until Sōkō)
Julian	1 October, AD 2026 (AM 7535)
Julian day	2461328
Korean	4 Gaedal, 4359 DE
Roman	Kalendis Octobribus, MMDCCLXXIX AUC
Solar Hijri	22 Mehr, SH 1405
Tibetan	4 tha skar, me pho rta 2153 or 1772 or 1000

The Maya calendar is a system of calendars used in pre-Columbian Mesoamerica and in many modern communities in the Guatemalan highlands, Veracruz, Oaxaca and Chiapas, Mexico.

The essentials of the Maya calendar are based upon a system which had been in common use throughout the region, dating back to at least the 5th century BC. It shares many aspects with calendars employed by other earlier Mesoamerican civilizations, such as the Zapotec and Olmec and contemporary or later ones such as the Mixtec and Aztec calendars.

By the Maya mythological tradition, as documented in Colonial Yucatec accounts and reconstructed from Late Classic and Postclassic inscriptions, the deity Itzamna is frequently credited with bringing the knowledge of the calendrical system to the ancestral Maya, along with writing in general and other foundational aspects of Maya culture.

== Overview ==
The Maya calendar consists of several cycles or counts of different lengths. The 260-day count is known to scholars as the Tzolkin, or Tzolkʼin. The Tzolkin was combined with a 365-day vague solar year known as the Haabʼ to form a synchronized cycle lasting for 52 Haabʼ called the Calendar Round. The Calendar Round is still in use by many groups in the Guatemalan highlands.

A different calendar was used to track longer periods of time and for the inscription of calendar dates (i.e., identifying when one event occurred in relation to others). This is the Long Count. It is a count of days since a mythological starting-point. According to the correlation between the Long Count and Western calendars accepted by the great majority of Maya researchers (known as the Goodman-Martinez-Thompson, or GMT, correlation), this starting-point is equivalent to August 11, 3114 BC in the proleptic Gregorian calendar, or September 6, 3114 BC (−3113 astronomical) in the Julian calendar. The GMT correlation was chosen by John Eric Sydney Thompson in 1935 on the basis of earlier correlations by Joseph Goodman in 1905 (August 11), Juan Martínez Hernández in 1926 (August 12) and Thompson himself in 1927 (August 13). By its linear nature, the Long Count was capable of being extended to refer to any date far into the past or future. This calendar involved the use of a positional notation system, in which each position signified an increasing multiple of the number of days. The Maya numeral system was essentially vigesimal (i.e., base-20) and each unit of a given position represented 20 times the unit of the position which preceded it. An important exception was made for the second-order place value, which instead represented 18 × 20, or 360 days, more closely approximating the solar year than would 20 × 20 = 400 days. The cycles of the Long Count are independent of the solar year.

Many Maya Long Count inscriptions contain a supplementary series, which provides information on the lunar phase, number of the current lunation in a series of six and which of the nine Lords of the Night rules.

Less-prevalent or poorly understood cycles, combinations and calendar progressions were also tracked. An 819-day Count is attested in a few inscriptions. Repeating sets of 9 days (see below "Nine lords of the night") associated with different groups of deities, animals and other significant concepts are also known.

== Tzolkʼin ==
The tzolkʼin (in modern Maya orthography; also commonly written tzolkin) is the name commonly employed by Mayanist researchers for the Maya Sacred Round or 260-day calendar. The word tzolkʼin is a neologism coined in Yucatec Maya, to mean "count of days" (Coe 1992). The various names of this calendar as used by precolumbian Maya people are still debated by scholars. The Aztec calendar equivalent was called Tōnalpōhualli, in the Nahuatl language.

The tzolkʼin calendar combines twenty day names with the thirteen day numbers to produce 260 unique days. It is used to determine the time of religious and ceremonial events and for divination. Each successive day is numbered from 1 up to 13 and then starting again at 1. Separately from this, every day is given a name in sequence from a list of 20 day names:

Tzolkʼin calendar: named days and associated glyphs
Day	Name (Note: Revised orthography of the Guatemalan Academia de Lenguas Mayas)	Glyph (Note: For most of these several different forms are recorded; the ones shown here are typical of carved monumental inscriptions.)	16th-century Yucatec (Note: From 16th-century Yucatec Maya accounts, principally recorded by Diego de Landa; this orthography was widely used until recently.)	Kʼicheʼ (Note: Kaqchikel, Tzʼutujil and Sakapultek use the same system.)	Mam	Ixil	Poqomchiʼ	Reconstructed Proto-Chʼolan	Tzeltal	Chicomuceltec	Chuj	Jakaltek	Qʼanjobʼal	Reconstructed Classic Maya (Note: In most cases, the actual day name as spoken Classic Maya, the language spoken when most inscriptions were made, is not known. The versions here are reconstructed on the basis of phonological evidence.)
01	Imix		Imix	Imox	Iimx	Imux	Imox	Na-Chan	Imox	Imox	Himox	Imox	Imox	Imix (?) / Haʼ (?)
02	Ikʼ		Ik	Iqʼ	Iiqʼ	Iʼqʼ	Iiqʼ	Ikʼ	Ikʼ	Iʼqʼ	Ikʼ	Iqʼ	Iqʼ	Ikʼ
03	Akʼbʼal		Akbal	Aqʼabʼal	Aqʼbʼaal	Aqʼbʼal	Aqʼabʼal	Wotan	Wotan	Votan	Woton	Watan	Watanh	Akʼbʼal (?)
04	Kʼan		Kan	Kʼat	Kʼach	Kʼach	Kʼaat	Kʼanan	Kʼanan	Khanan / Ghanan	Kʼanaʼ	Kʼanaʼ	Kʼanaʼ	Kʼan (?)
05	Chikchan		Chicchan	Kan	Kaan	Kan	Kaʼn	Chaʼk-Chan	Abʼak	Abakh / Abagh	Abʼak	Abʼak	Abʼak	
06	Kimi		Cimi	Kame	Kameey	Kamel	Kemeeh	Tox	Tox	Tox	Tox	Tox	Tox	Cham (?)
07	Manikʼ		Manik	Kej	Kyeej	Cheh	Keej	Manichʼ	Moxic	Moxic	Kej	Chej	Cheh	Manichʼ (?)
08	Lamat		Lamat	Qʼanil	Qʼaniil / Qʼaneel	Qʼanil	Qʼaniil	Lam(bʼ)at	Lamat	Lambat	Lanhbʼat	Lambʼat	Qʼanil	Ekʼ (?)
09	Muluk		Muluc	Toj	Chooj	Choh	Tooj	Mulu(k)	Mul	Mulu	Mulu	Muluʼ	Muluʼ	
10	Ok		Oc	Tzʼiʼ	Txʼiʼ	Txʼiʼ	Tzʼiʼ	Ok	Uk	Elab	Elabʼ	Elabʼ	Elabʼ	
11	Chuwen		Chuen	Bʼatzʼ	Bʼatzʼ	Bʼaʼtzʼ	Bʼaatzʼ	Bʼatzʼ	Bʼatzʼ	Batz	Bʼaʼatzʼ	Bʼatzʼ	Bʼatzʼ	
12	Ebʼ		Eb	Eʼ	Eeʼ	Eh	Eeh	Eb	Ewabʼ	Evob	Eyubʼ	Awnubʼ	Ewubʼ	
13	Bʼen		Ben	Aj	Aaj	Ah	Aaj	Bʼin	Bʼen	Bʼeʼn	Bʼeʼen	Bʼen	Ah	C'klab
14	Ix		Ix	Iʼx, Balam	Iʼx	Iʼx	Iʼx	Hix	Hix	Hiʼx	Hiʼix	Ix	Ix	Hix (?)
15	Men		Men	Tzikin	Tzʼikyin	Tzʼikyin	Tzʼikin	Men	Tzʼikin	Tzʼikin	Tzʼikin	Tzʼikin	Tzʼikin	Men (?)
16	Kʼibʼ		Cib	Ajmaq	Ajmaq	Ahmaq	Ajmaq	Chaʼbʼin	Chabʼin	Chabin	Chabʼin	Txabʼin	Txabʼin	
17	Kabʼan		Caban	Noʼj	Noʼj	Noʼj	Noʼj	Chab	Chik	Chic	Kixkabʼ	Kixkabʼ	Noh	Chabʼ (?)
18	Etzʼnabʼ		Etznab	Tijax	Chiʼj	Tiaxh	Tejaax	Itzʼanabʼ	Chinax, Itzʼanabʼ	Chinax	Chinhax	Chinax	Chinhax	
19	Kawak		Cauac	Kawoq	Kyooq	Kaoq	Kohoq	Chahk	Chahuk	Kahoq	Chawok	Kaq	Kajh	
20	Ajaw		Ahau	Ajpu	Ajpuuʼ	Junahpu	Ajpuhbʼ	Ajwal	Ajwal	Ajwaal	Ajaw	Ajaw	Ahaw	Ajaw

Some systems started the count with 1 Imix, followed by 2 Ikʼ, 3 Akʼbʼal, etc. up to 13 Bʼen. The day numbers then start again at 1 while the named-day sequence continues onwards, so the next days in the sequence are 1 Ix, 2 Men, 3 Kʼibʼ, 4 Kabʼan, 5 Etzʼnabʼ, 6 Kawak and 7 Ajaw. With all twenty named days used, these now began to repeat the cycle while the number sequence continues, so the next day after 7 Ajaw is 8 Imix. The repetition of these interlocking 13- and 20-day cycles therefore takes 260 days to complete (that is, for every possible combination of number/named day to occur once).

The earliest known inscription with a Tzolkʼin is an Olmec earspool with 2 Ahau 3 Ceh - 6.3.10.9.0, September 2, -678 (Julian astronomical).

== Haabʼ ==
Haabʼ months: names and glyphs in sequence
Seq. Num.	Yucatec name	Hieroglyph	Classic Period glyph sign	Meaning of glyph	Reconstructed Classic Maya	Tzeltal (colonial orthography) (Note: Tzotzil supposedly used the same month names.)	Kʼicheʼ (colonial orthography)	Kaqchikel (colonial orthography)
1	Pop	𝋠			k'anjalaw	Tzun	Tequexepual	Tacaxepual
2	Woʼ	𝋠			ik'at	Batzul	Tziba pop	Nabey tumuzuz
3	Sip	𝋠			chakat	Si sac	Zac	Rucab tumuzuz
4	Sotzʼ	𝋠		bat	sotz'	Mucta sac	Chʼab	Cibixic
5	Sek	𝋠			kaseew	Moc	Nabey mam	Uchum
6	Xul	𝋠			chikin	Olalti	Ucab mam	Nabey mam
7	Yaxkʼin	𝋠			yaxk'in	Ulol	Nabey likʼin kʼa	Rucab mam
8	Mol	𝋠			mol	Oquinajual	Ucab likʼin kʼa	Likʼin kʼa
9	Chʼen	𝋠		black	ik'siho'm	Veh	Nabey pach	Nabey tokʼikʼ
10	Yax	𝋠		green	yaxsiho'm	Elech	Ucab pach	Rucab tokʼikʼ
11	Sak	𝋠		white	saksiho'm	Nichquin	Tzizi lakam	Nabey pach
12	Keh	𝋠		red	chaksiho'm	Sban viniquil	Tziquin kʼih	Rucab pach
13	Mak	𝋠			mak	Xchibal viniquil	Cakam / Cakan	Tziquin kʼih
14	Kʼankʼin	𝋠			uniiw	Yoxibal viniquil	Botam	Cakan
15	Muwan	𝋠			muwaan	Xchanbal viniquil	Nabey zih	Ibota
16	Pax	𝋠			paxiil	Poin	Ucab zih	Katic
17	Kʼayab	𝋠			k'anasiiy	Mux	Rox zih	Izcal
18	Kumkʼu	𝋠			ohl	Yan kin	Chee	Pariche
19	Wayebʼ	𝋠		five unlucky days	wayhaab			

The Haabʼ was made up of eighteen months of twenty days each plus a period of five days ("nameless days") at the end of the year known as Wayeb' (or Uayeb in 16th-century orthography). The five days of Wayebʼ were thought to be a dangerous time. Foster (2002) writes, "During Wayeb, portals between the mortal realm and the Underworld dissolved. No boundaries prevented the ill-intending deities from causing disasters." To ward off these evil spirits, the Maya had customs and rituals they practiced during Wayebʼ. For example, people avoided leaving their houses and washing or combing their hair. Bricker (1982) estimates that the Haabʼ was first used around 550 BC with a starting point of the winter solstice.

The Haabʼ month names are known today by their corresponding names in colonial-era Yukatek Maya, as transcribed by 16th-century sources (in particular, Diego de Landa and books such as the Chilam Balam of Chumayel). Phonemic analyses of Haabʼ glyph names in pre-Columbian Maya inscriptions have demonstrated that the names for these twenty-day periods varied considerably from region to region and from period to period, reflecting differences in the base language(s) and usage in the Classic and Postclassic eras predating their recording by Spanish sources.

Each day in the Haabʼ calendar was identified by a day number in the month followed by the name of the month. Day numbers began with a glyph translated as the "seating of" a named month, which is usually regarded as day 0 of that month, although a minority treat it as day 20 of the month preceding the named month. In the latter case, the seating of Pop is day 5 of Wayebʼ. For the majority, the first day of the year was 0 Pop (the seating of Pop). This was followed by 1 Pop, 2 Pop as far as 19 Pop then 0 Wo, 1 Wo and so on.

Because the Haabʼ had 365 days and the tropical year is 365.2422 days, the days of the Haabʼ did not coincide with the tropical year.

== Calendar Round ==
A Calendar Round date is a date that gives both the Tzolkʼin and Haabʼ. This date will repeat after 52 Haabʼ years or 18,980 days, a Calendar Round. For example, the current creation started on 4 Ahau 8 Kumkʼu. When this date recurs it is known as a Calendar Round completion.

Arithmetically, the duration of the Calendar Round is the least common multiple of 260 and 365; 18,980 is 73 × 260 Tzolkʼin days and 52 × 365 Haabʼ days.

Not every possible combination of Tzolkʼin and Haabʼ can occur. For Tzolkʼin days Imix, Kimi, Chuwen and Kibʼ, the Haabʼ day can only be 4, 9, 14 or 19; for Ikʼ, Manikʼ, Ebʼ and Kabʼan, the Haabʼ day can only be 0, 5, 10 or 15; for Akbʼalʼ, Lamat, Bʼen and Etzʼnabʼ, the Haabʼ day can only be 1, 6, 11 or 16; for Kʼan, Muluk, Ix and Kawak, the Haabʼ day can only be 2, 7, 12 or 17; and for Chikchan, Ok, Men and Ajaw, the Haabʼ day can only be 3, 8, 13 or 18.

=== Year Bearer ===
A "Year Bearer" is a Tzolkʼin day name that occurs on 0 Pop, the first day of the Haabʼ. Since there are 20 Tzolkʼin day names, 365 days in the Haabʼ, and the remainder of 365 divided by 20 is 5 (365 = 18×20 + 5), the Tzolkʼin day name for each successive 0 Pop will be 5 later in the cycle of Tzolk'in day names. Similarly, since there are 13 Tzolk'in day numbers, and the remainder of 365 divided by 13 is 1 (365 = 28×13 + 1), the Tzolk'in day number for each successive 0 Pop will be 1 greater than before. As such, the sequence of Tzolk'in dates corresponding to the Haab' date 0 Pop are as follows:

- 1 Ikʼ
- 2 Manikʼ
- 3 Ebʼ
- 4 Kabʼan
- 5 Ikʼ
- ...
- 12 Kab'an
- 13 Ik'
- 1 Manik'
- ...

Thus, the Year Bearers are the four Tzolkʼin day names that appear in this sequence: Ik', Manik', Eb', and Kab'an.

"Year Bearer" literally translates a Maya concept. Its importance resides in two facts. For one, the four years headed by the Year Bearers are named after them and share their characteristics; therefore, they also have their own prognostications and patron deities. Moreover, since the Year Bearers are geographically identified with boundary markers or mountains, they help define the local community.

The classic system of Year Bearers described above is found at Tikal and in the Dresden Codex. During the Late Classic period a different set of Year Bearers was in use in Campeche. In this system, the Year Bearers were the Tzolkʼin that coincided with 1 Pop. These were Akʼbʼal, Lamat, Bʼen and Edznab. During the Post-Classic period in Yucatán a third system was in use. In this system the Year Bearers were the days that coincided with 2 Pop: Kʼan, Muluc, Ix and Kawak. This system is found in the Chronicle of Oxkutzcab. In addition, just before the Spanish conquest in Mayapan the Maya began to number the days of the Haabʼ from 1 to 20. In this system the Year Bearers are the same as in the 1 Pop – Campeche system. The Classic Year Bearer system is still in use in the Guatemalan highlands and in Veracruz, Oaxaca and Chiapas, Mexico.

== Long Count ==
East side of Stela C, Quirigua with the mythical creation date of 13 baktuns, 0 katuns, 0 tuns, 0 uinals, 0 kins, 4 Ahau, 8 Cumku – August 11, 3114 BC in the proleptic Gregorian calendar

Since Calendar Round dates repeat every 18,980 days, approximately 52 solar years, the cycle repeats roughly once each lifetime, so a more refined method of dating was needed if history was to be recorded accurately. To specify dates over periods longer than 52 years, Mesoamericans used the Long Count calendar.

The Maya name for a day was kʼin. Twenty of these kʼins are known as a winal or uinal. Eighteen winals make one tun. Twenty tuns are known as a kʼatun. Twenty kʼatuns make a bʼakʼtun.

The Long Count calendar identifies a date by counting the number of days from the Maya creation date 4 Ahaw, 8 Kumkʼu (August 11, 3114 BC in the proleptic Gregorian calendar or September 6 in the Julian calendar -3113 astronomical dating). But instead of using a base-10 (decimal) scheme, the Long Count days were tallied in a modified base-20 scheme. Thus 0.0.0.1.5 is equal to 25 and 0.0.0.2.0 is equal to 40. As the winal unit resets after only counting to 18, the Long Count consistently uses base-20 only if the tun is considered the primary unit of measurement, not the kʼin; with the kʼin and winal units being the number of days in the tun. The Long Count 0.0.1.0.0 represents 360 days, rather than the 400 in a purely base-20 (vigesimal) count.

There are also four rarely used higher-order cycles: piktun, kalabtun, kʼinchiltun, and alautun.

Since the Long Count dates are unambiguous, the Long Count was particularly well suited to use on monuments. The monumental inscriptions would not only include the 5 digits of the Long Count, but would also include the two tzolkʼin characters followed by the two haabʼ characters.

Misinterpretation of the Mesoamerican Long Count calendar was the basis for a popular belief that a cataclysm would take place on December 21, 2012. December 21, 2012 was simply the day that the calendar went to the next bʼakʼtun, at Long Count 13.0.0.0.0. The date of the start of the next b'ak'tun (Long Count 14.0.0.0.0) is March 26, 2407. The date of the start of the next piktun (a complete series of 20 bʼakʼtuns), at Long Count 1.0.0.0.0.0, is October 13, 4772.

Table of Long Count units
Long Count unit	Long Count period	Days	Approximate Solar Years
1 Kʼin		1	
1 Winal	20 Kʼin	20	
1 Tun	18 Winal	360	1
1 Kʼatun	20 Tun	7,200	20
1 Bʼakʼtun	20 Kʼatun	144,000	394
1 Piktun	20 Bʼakʼtun	2,880,000	7,885
1 Kalabtun	20 Piktun	57,600,000	157,704
1 Kʼinchiltun	20 Kalabtun	1,152,000,000	3,154,071
1 Alautun	20 Kʼinchiltun	23,040,000,000	63,081,429
1 Hablatun	20 Alautun	460,800,000,000	1,261,628,585

== Supplementary Series ==
Many Classic period inscriptions include a series of glyphs known as the Supplementary Series. The operation of this series was largely worked out by John E. Teeple. The Supplementary Series most commonly consists of the following elements:

=== Lords of the Night ===
Each night was ruled by one of the nine lords of the underworld. This nine-day cycle was usually written as two glyphs: a glyph that referred to the Nine Lords as a group, followed by a glyph for the lord that would rule the next night.

=== Lunar Series ===
A lunar series generally is written as five glyphs that provide information about the current lunation, the number of the lunation in a series of six, the current ruling lunar deity and the length of the current lunation.

=== Moon age ===
The Maya counted the number of days in the current lunation. They used two systems for the zero date of the lunar cycle: either the first night they could see the thin crescent moon or the first morning when they could not see the waning moon. The age of the moon was depicted by a set of glyphs that Mayanists coined glyphs D and E:

- A new moon glyph was used for day zero in the lunar cycle.
- D glyphs were used for lunar ages for days 1 through 19, with the number of days that had passed from the new moon.
- For lunar ages 20 to 30, an E glyph was used, with the number of days from 20.

=== Count of Lunations ===
The Maya counted the lunations. This cycle appears in the lunar series as two glyphs that modern scholars call the 'C' and 'X' glyphs. The C glyph could be prefixed with a number indicating the lunation. No prefixing number meant one, whereas the numbers two through six indicated the other lunations. There was also a part of the C glyph that indicated where this fell in a larger cycle of 18 lunations. Accompanying the C glyph was the 'X' glyph that showed a similar pattern of 18 lunations.

=== Lunation length ===
The present era lunar synodic period is about 29.5305877 mean solar days or about 29 days 12 hours 44 minutes and 2+^{7}/_{9} seconds. As a whole number, the number of days per lunation will be either 29 or 30 days, with the 30-day intervals necessarily occurring slightly more frequently than the 29-day intervals. The Maya wrote whether the lunar month was 29 or 30 days as two glyphs: a glyph for lunation length followed by either a glyph made up of a moon glyph over a bundle with a suffix of 9 for a 29-day lunation or a moon glyph with a suffix of 10 for a 30-day lunation. Since the Maya didn't use fractions, lunations were approximated by using the formula that there were 149 lunations completed in 4400 days, which yielded a rather short mean month of exactly ^{4400}/_{149} = 29+^{79}/_{149} days = 29 days 12 hours 43 minutes and 29+^{59}/_{149} seconds, or about 29.5302 days.

== 819-day count ==
Some Maya monuments include glyphs that record an 819-day count in their Initial Series. These can also be found in the Dresden codex. This is described in Thompson. More examples of this can be found in Kelley. Each group of 819 days was associated with one of four colors and the cardinal direction with which it was associated – black corresponded to west, red to east, white to north and yellow to south.

The 819-day count can be described several ways: Most of these are referred to using a "Y" glyph and a number. Many also have a glyph for Kʼawill – the god with a smoking mirror in his head. Kʼawill has been suggested as having a link to Jupiter. In the Dresden codex almanac 59 there are Chaacs of the four colors. The accompanying texts begin with a directional glyph and a verb for 819-day-count phrases. Anderson provides a detailed description of the 819-day count.

=== Synodic periods of the classical planets ===
   Moon: 1 x 819 + 8 days = 28 (synodic 29.53 d) "28 months"
   Moon: 4 x 819 + 2 days = 111 (synodic 29.53 d) "111 months"
   Moon: 15 x 819 + 0.3 days = 416 (synodic 29.53 d) "416 months"

   Draconic: 31 x 819 days = 933 (draconic 27.21 d) "nodal months"

   Mercury: 1 x 819 + 8 days = 7 (synodic 115.88 d)
   Mercury: 15 x 819 + 2 days = 106 (synodic 115.88 d)

   Venus: 5 x 819 + 8 days = 7 (synodic 583.9 d)

   Sun: 4 x 819 + 11 days = 9 (synodic 365.24 d) "9 years"
   Sun: 33 x 819 + 1 days = 74 (synodic 365.24 d) "74 years"

   Mars: 20 x 819 + 2 days = 21 (synodic 779.9 d)

   Jupiter: 1 x 819 + 21 days = 2 (synodic 398.88 d)
   Jupiter: 19 x 819 + 5 days = 39 (synodic 398.88 d)

   Saturn: 6 x 819 - 1 days = 13 (synod 378.09 d)

== Short count ==
During the late Classic period the Maya began to use an abbreviated short count instead of the Long Count. An example of this can be found on altar 14 at Tikal. In the kingdoms of Postclassic Yucatán, the Short Count was used instead of the Long Count. The cyclical Short Count is a count of 13 kʼatuns (or 260 tuns), in which each kʼatun was named after its concluding day, Ahau ('Lord'). 1 Imix was selected as the recurrent 'first day' of the cycle, corresponding to 1 Cipactli in the Aztec day count. The cycle was counted from katun 11 Ahau to katun 13 Ahau. Since a katun is 20 × 360 = 7200 days long, and the remainder of 7200 divided by 13 is 11 (7200 = 553×13 + 11), the day number of the concluding day of each successive katun is 9 greater than before (wrapping around at 13, since only 13 day numbers are used). That is, starting with the katun that begins with 1 Imix, the sequence of concluding day numbers is 11, 9, 7, 5, 3, 1, 12, 10, 8, 6, 4, 2, 13, 11, ..., all named Ahau. The concluding day 13 Ahau was followed by the re-entering first day 1 Imix. This is the system as found in the colonial Books of Chilam Balam. In characteristic Mesoamerican fashion, these books project the cycle onto the landscape, with 13 Ahauob 'Lordships' dividing the land of Yucatán into 13 'kingdoms'.

== See also ==
- 2012 phenomenon
- Maya religion
- Mayanism
- Tres Zapotes#Stela C
- Maya Astronomy
- Aztec calendar
