= James R. Partridge =

American diplomat and politician

United States Ambassador to Brazil
- In office July 31, 1871 – June 11, 1877
- President: Ulysses S. Grant; Rutherford B. Hayes
- Preceded by: Henry T. Blow
- Succeeded by: Henry W. Hilliard

64th Secretary of State of Maryland
- In office 1858–1861
- Governor: Thomas H. Hicks
- Preceded by: Jonathan Pinkney
- Succeeded by: Grayson Eichelberger

Personal details
- Born: James Rudolph Partridge; October 26, 1823 Baltimore, Maryland, U.S.
- Died: February 24, 1884 (aged 60) Alicante, Spain
- Political party: Whig (1843-1856); Republican (1856-1884)

James Rudolph Partridge (October 26, 1823 – February 24, 1884) was a diplomat and politician who served in a variety of positions, including as a Maryland State Delegate, Secretary of State of Maryland, Minister Resident to Honduras and United States Ambassador to Brazil.

== Early life and education ==
Partridge was born in Maryland in 1823. He graduated from Harvard University in 1841 and received masters and law degrees from Harvard in 1843. After graduation, Partridge practiced law in Baltimore and served on a federal commission appointed to resolve Mexican War claims.

== Political life ==
Partridge was elected to the Maryland House of Delegates in 1856, serving as the chairman of its judiciary committee. He was appointed Maryland Secretary of State two years later by the newly elected Governor of Maryland Thomas H. Hicks. He served in the role from 1858 until 1861.

In 1862, Partridge was appointed by President Abraham Lincoln to serve as the first foreign minister to Honduras, a post he held from April 25, 1862, until November 14, 1862. Partridge later served as the first U.S. foreign minister to El Salvador from June 15, 1863, to March 22, 1866, and as foreign minister to Venezuela from July 8, 1869, to May 9, 1870. Partridge was one of the individuals responsible for establishing diplomatic relations with El Salvador, and supervised the opening of the U.S. Embassy in San Salvador.

In 1871, Partridge was appointed by President Ulysses S. Grant to the role of U.S. Ambassador to Brazil. He served in the post for nearly six years, from July 31, 1871, to June 11, 1877. During that time, Partridge retained a residence in Washington, D.C.

In April 1882, Partridge was appointed as a foreign minister to Peru after the sudden death of Stephen A. Hurlbut. He took the oath of office and proceeded to the post, but did not present credentials. He was recalled after trying to coordinate the intervention of European diplomats in a war between Peru and Chile, which the Arthur administration said was unauthorized and a violation of the Monroe Doctrine. He left Peru in March 1883.

He was later named for a post as a foreign minister to Nicaragua, but his nomination was withdrawn from the United States Senate for consideration.

== Death ==
In the last year of his life, Partridge sailed for Europe, traveled to France, Malta and the Holy Land, and resided for a brief period in Spain. Depressed over the deaths of his wife and children which had occurred over several years, he committed suicide in Alicante on February 24, 1884.
