= Vineland, Missouri =

Unincorporated community in Missouri, U.S.

Coordinates: 38°05′43″N 90°36′46″W

Vineland is an unincorporated community in Jefferson County, in the U.S. state of Missouri.

== History ==
Vineland was platted in 1869, and named for vineyards near the original town site. A post office called Vineland was established in 1867, and remained in operation until 1955.
