= Maximilian Toch =

American chemist (1864–1946)

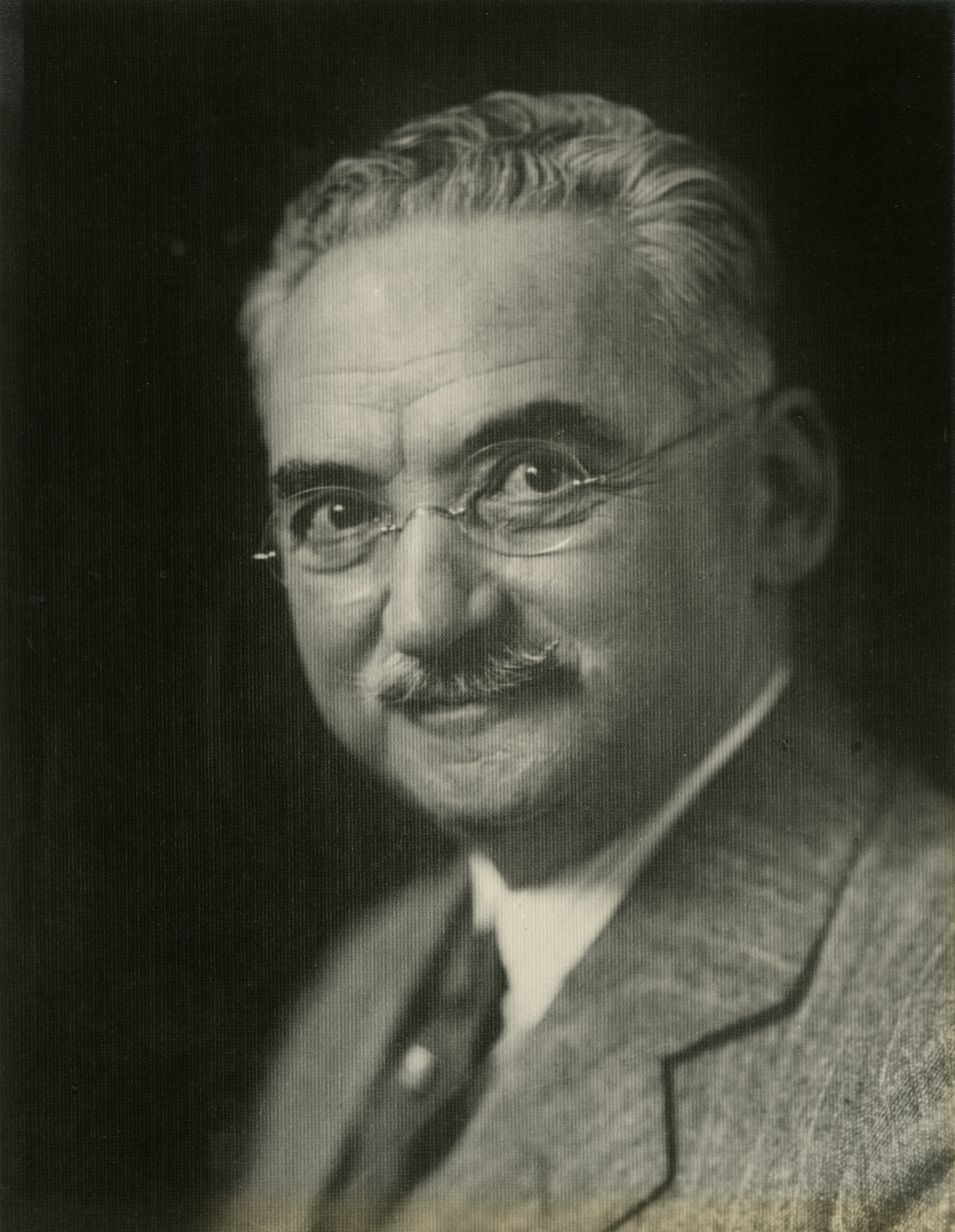
- President of the Chemists Club, 1907
- Born: July 17, 1864; New York City, New York, US
- Died: May 28, 1946 (aged 81); New York City, New York, US
- Education: Cooper Union; New York University; Columbia University
- Known for: Ship camouflage
- Scientific career
- Fields: Industrial chemistry
- Workplaces: Toch Brothers; Standard Varnish Works; Cooper Union; Beijing University; Columbia University; City College of New York; National Academy of Design

Maximilian Toch (July 17, 1864 – May 28, 1946) was an American paint manufacturer and industrial chemist who developed a concrete filler method that was used in the construction of the Panama Canal. He was the co-owner of the New York firms Toch Brothers and the Standard Varnish Works, where he was head of research and production. Before and during World War I, he was a major contributor to the development of ship camouflage in the United States, as well as an early practitioner of the use of chemistry in the authentication of works of art.

== Background ==
According to an obituary in the New York Times (1946), Toch was born and raised in New York. He attended Cooper Union and New York University as an undergraduate, then completed his graduate studies at Columbia University. He also earned degrees in law. He taught chemistry and chemical engineering and industrial chemistry at colleges and universities, including Cooper Union, Beijing University, Columbia University, City College of New York, and the National Academy of Design.

== Ship camouflage ==
According to the New York Times (1946), in which Toch is referred to as "America’s first camoufleur", his contribution to ship camouflage included originating the color adopted by the U.S. Navy as standard "battleship gray". By his own account (Toch 1919), he had camouflaged fortifications in Panama as early as 1915, the success of which led to his being assigned to camouflage shipyards and docks on the East Coast of the U.S. during World War I.

In 1917, a ship concealment plan devised by Toch, known as the Toch System, was one of five camouflage measures approved by the U.S. Naval Consulting Board for use on merchant ships (Behrens 2009, pp. 350–351). He became convinced that it was largely impossible to lower the visibility of a ship, but that a better objective would be course deception, popularly known as dazzle camouflage.

== Art authentication ==
Photo post card of Maximilian Toch sent from Toch to A.J. Bogdanove in 1940

Toch’s outspoken views about the use of chemical analysis in authenticating works of art became controversial in the 1920s (Hendrick 1929), when he claimed that the majority of paintings attributed to Rembrandt had not in fact been painted by him (Toch 1931b), including works in the collections of art museums. As a result, it was said at the time that art dealers "entertain a wholesome fear of him" (Hendrick 1919, p. 704).

== His writings ==
Toch produced books on subjects related to chemistry, among them The Chemistry and Technology of Mixed Paints (1907), Materials for Permanent Painting (1911), How To Paint Permanent Pictures (1922), Paint, Paintings and Restoration (1931), and Protection and Decoration of Concrete (1931). He was the uncle of art materials expert Ralph Mayer, author of The Artist’s Handbook (1940).
