= William McMurtrie =

American chemist

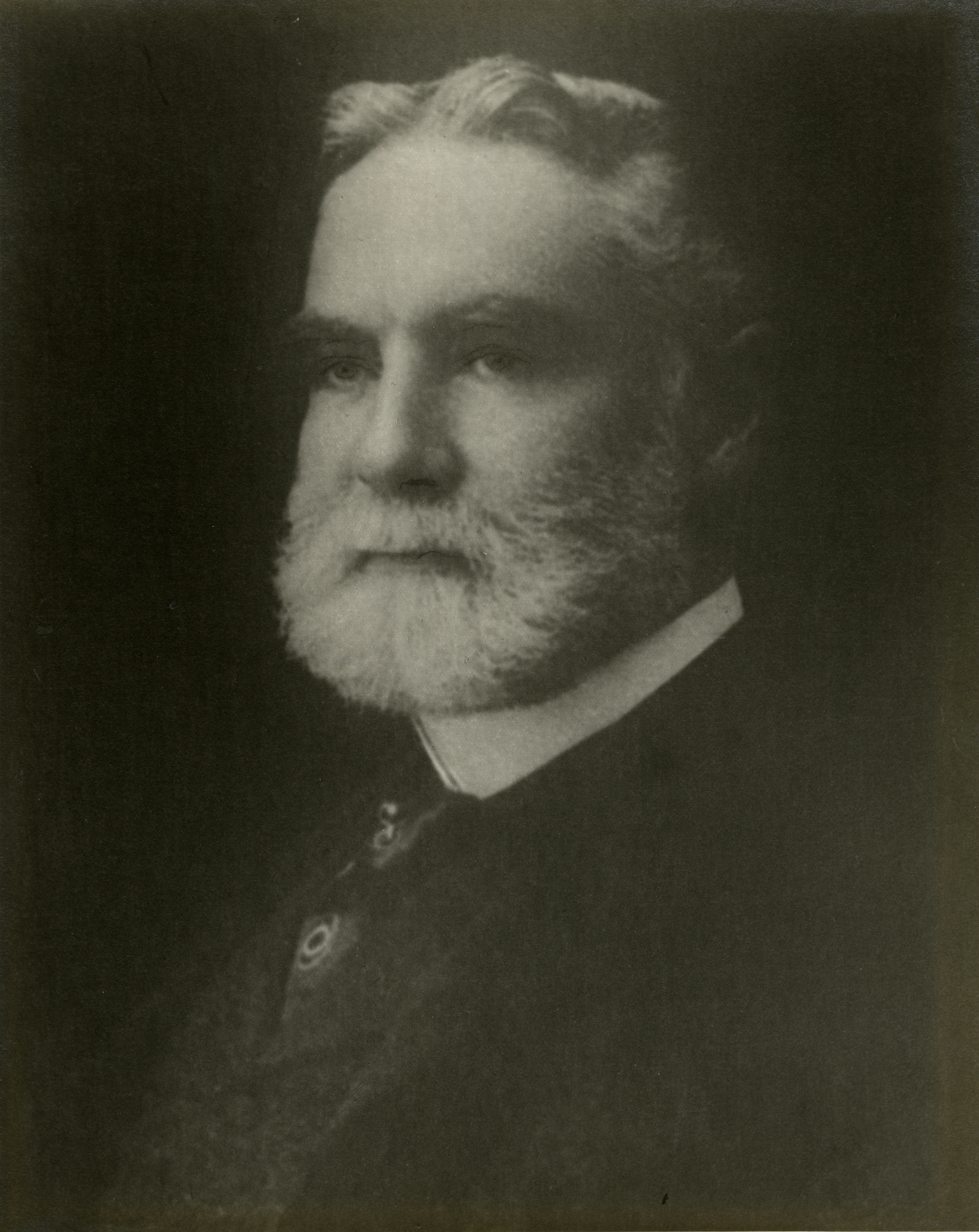
- Chemists Club President, 1903-1904
- Born: March 10, 1851; Belvidere, New Jersey
- Died: May 24, 1913 (aged 62); New York, New York
- Resting place: Oak Hill Cemetery
- Education: Ph.D.
- Alma mater: Lafayette College
- Occupation: Chemist
- Spouse: Helen Douglass
- Children: Douglas C. Helen Douglas
- Parent(s): Abram McMurtrie; Almira Smith

William McMurtrie (March 10, 1851 – May 24, 1913) was an American chemist. His work helped launch the sugar beet industry in the United States.

== Life and career ==
Born on a farm near Belvidere, New Jersey, the son of Abram McMurtrie and Almira Smith, William matriculated to Lafayette College where he graduated with a mining engineer degree in 1871—the school did not then offer a degree program in chemistry, his primary interest. He undertook graduate studies at the College during 1871–1872 and was appointed as an assistant chemist with the United States Department of Agriculture. In 1873, he was named chief chemist for the department; a post he held until 1878. He was awarded a Ph.D. from Lafayette in 1875—the first doctorate in chemistry awarded at the school. On April 5, 1876, he was married to Helen Douglass and the couple had two children.

McMurtrie traveled to the Paris Exposition in 1878 as representative of the Department of Agriculture. He became a special agent of the department in 1879, collecting information regarding agricultural technology. The following year, he served as a representative for the commissioner of agriculture at an international exhibit in Philadelphia for sheep, wool, and wool products. Published in 1880, his Report on the culture of the sugar beet and the manufacture of sugar therefrom in France and the United States helped to launch the sugar beet industry in the United States.

From 1882 until 1888, McMurtrie was professor of chemistry at the University of Illinois. In 1884, he was named chemist for the Illinois State Board of Agriculture, then become chemist for the Illinois Agricultural Station in 1886. He entered the commercial sphere in 1888 when he moved to New York to work as chemist for the New York Tartar Company. In 1896, Dr. McMurtrie was chosen vice president of the chemistry section for the American Association for the Advancement of Science. He was selected president of the American Chemical Society in 1900. He served as a trustee for Lafayette College from 1906 until 1912. During his career he was the author of numerous reports prepared for the U.S. Department of Agriculture.

He died in New York City on May 24, 1913, and was buried at Oak Hill Cemetery in Washington, D.C.

== Awards and honors ==
- Chevalier de Merite Agricole, 1883
