= Martin Ittner =

American chemist (1870–1945)

Martin Hill Ittner
- Born: May 2, 1870; Berlin Heights, Ohio, US
- Died: April 22, 1945 (aged 74); Jersey City, New Jersey, US
- Education: Washington University in St. Louis; Harvard University
- Awards: Perkin Medal
- Scientific career
- Workplaces: Colgate-Palmolive

Martin Hill Ittner (May 2, 1870, in Berlin Heights, Ohio – April 22, 1945, in Jersey City, New Jersey) was a chemist working for Colgate, now known as Colgate-Palmolive. He is best known for his contributions to applied chemistry, including the development of toothpaste and detergent.

== Academic qualifications ==
- Bachelor of Phil. from Washington University, 1892
- Bachelor of Science from Washington University, 1894
- Masters (1895) and PhD (1896) from Harvard University
- Honorary PhD from Colgate University, 1930
- Honorary L.L.D. from Washington University, 1938

== Major contributions ==
Ittner joined the Colgate Company in 1896 as its chief chemist. He remained with the company after it became Colgate-Palmolive-Peet Company in 1928. He was one of the first U.S. chemists to develop methods for the hydrogenation of fatty oils. Among his achievements where the development of a washing soap made from petroleum hydrocarbons, and new processes to make soap and glycerol.

Ittner developed the first applied chemistry research team at Colgate. He developed this research lab throughout his whole working life. Work in the Colgate research lab fostered many developments in detergents with many of the patents being held in Martin Hill Ittner's name.

Ittner served as chairman of the New York section of the American Chemical Society in 1922, and as chairman of the American Chemical Society's Committee on Industrial Alcohol. He successfully recommended that United States Congress legitimize the manufacture and use of alcohol for the chemical industry during Prohibition in the United States. He also served as president and as treasurer of the American Institute of Chemical Engineers, and as president of The Chemists' Club in New York.

== Awards ==
Ittner received an honorary doctorate of science from Colgate University in 1930. On June 7, 1938, Ittner gave a commencement speech on The Function of Technology in Modern Society at Washington University, where he was awarded an honorary degree.

In 1942 Ittner was awarded the Perkin Medal for applied chemistry in recognition of his contributions.

== Patents ==
A listing of his patents includes:

- US2164276
- US2501467
- US2357829
- US2403925
- US2139589
- US1509431
- US2474740
- US2435745
- US2130353
- US2319405
- US1367973
- US1271576
- USRE22006

== Publications ==
- Ittner, Martin Hill (September 1926). "Progress in the Soap Industry during the Last Fifty Years". Industrial & Engineering Chemistry. 18 (9): 908–910. doi:10.1021/ie50201a008.

== See also ==
- Perkin Medal
