= Robert Cairns =

Robert Cairns may refer to:

- Robert Cairns (footballer) (1927–1958), English footballer
- Bobby Cairns (1929–1998), Scottish footballer
- Robert W. Cairns (1909–1985), American chemist
