= Rope trick =

The term rope trick may refer to:

- Magic trick, any trick involving a rope
  - Indian rope trick, a trick involving causing a rope to appear to levitate in the air and then climbing up it
- Nylon rope trick, a demonstration of the chemical principles of step-growth polymerization
- Rope trick effect, in physics, seen in photographs of nuclear explosions when there are ropes attached to the exploding object
- Trick roping, in western arts or wild west shows
