= Rodney H. Banks =

American chemist

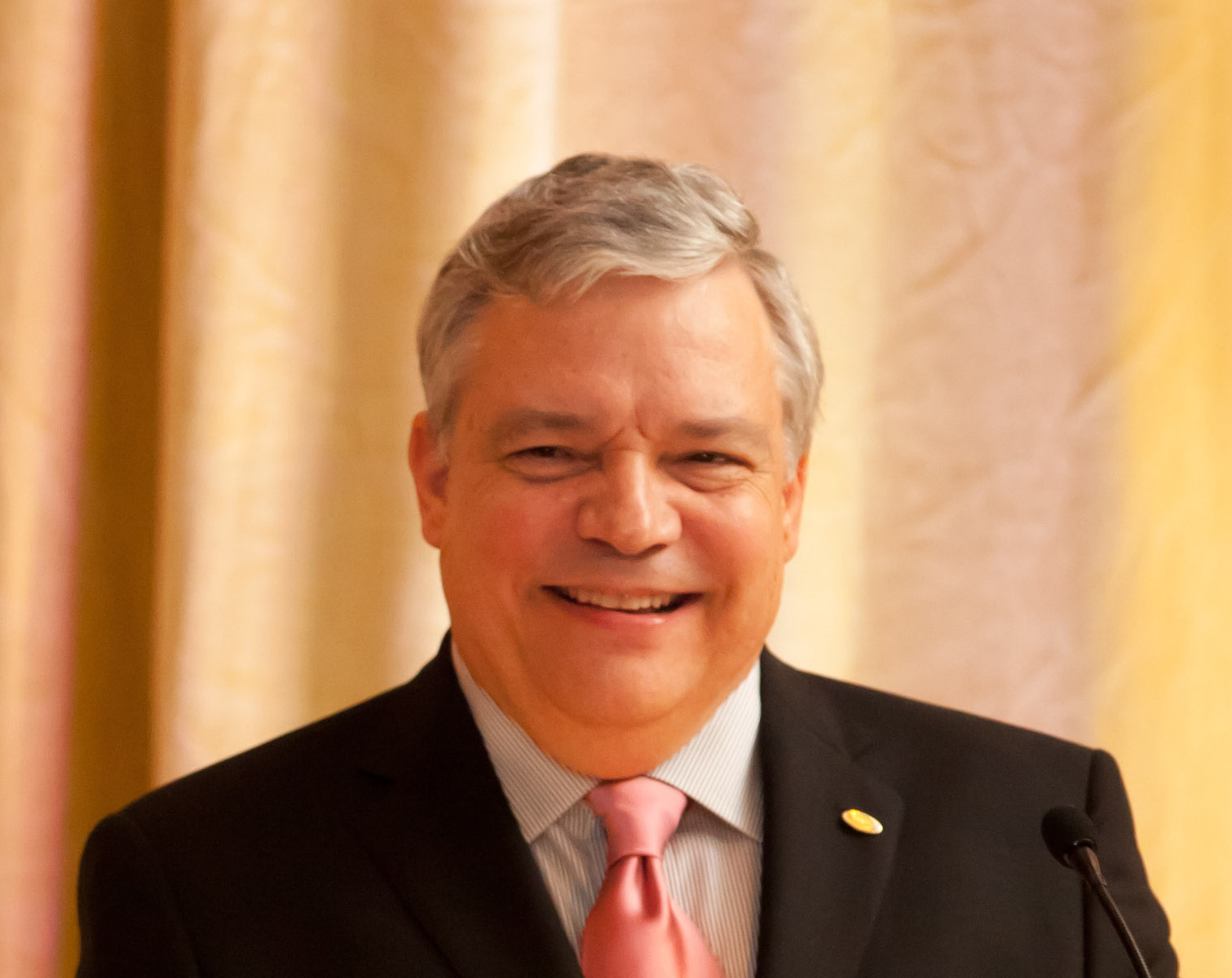
- Rodney Banks, 2011
- Born: January 14, 1953 (age 73); Long Beach, California, U.S.
- Education: UC Berkeley; Johns Hopkins
- Awards: Perkin Medal (2011)
- Scientific career
- Fields: Chemistry
- Workplaces: Nalco Company
- Doctoral advisor: Glenn Theodore Seaborg

Rodney H. Banks (born January 14, 1953) is an American industrial chemist and a research fellow at Nalco Holding Company in Naperville, Illinois, now a wholly owned subsidiary of Ecolab Inc. His inventions have greatly improved the control of industrial water treatment. In 2011, Banks received the Perkin Medal for his work from the American section of the Society of Chemical Industry, the highest award for applied chemistry in the United States.

== Early life and education ==
Banks was born in Long Beach, California, on January 14, 1953, and later moved with his family to Maryland. His father Mark worked as a chemist for the U.S. Defense Department in Washington, D.C., inspiring the younger Banks to pursue the same field. Banks attended Johns Hopkins University, graduating with a bachelor's degree in chemistry in 1975. In 1980, he received his Ph.D. in inorganic/physical chemistry from the University of California, Berkeley, where he worked for Nobel laureate and fellow Perkin medal winner Glenn Seaborg on the synthesis and characterization of volatile actinide compounds.

== Professional life ==
Banks moved to the Chicago area in 1980, working briefly as a post-doctoral student at Argonne National Laboratory on x-ray photoemission spectroscopy properties of neptunium oxides before joining Nalco Chemical Company as a research scientist.

In the mid-1980s, Banks and other Nalco researchers identified opportunities for improved monitoring and control of water used in many industrial systems, especially in cooling towers, for both commercial and office buildings and in industrial plants such as paper mills, oil refineries, automotive plants and steel mills. He and colleague John Hoots subsequently led the invention and commercialization of fluorescent tracing technology, trade-named TRASAR. Banks' work involved using chemical and mechanical sensors for improved monitoring and control. The 3D TRASAR version of this technology won a United States Presidential Green Chemistry Challenge Award for its cooling water application in 2008.

Banks has created various electrochemical, optical, quartz crystal microbalance-based sensors to measure chemical treatment levels, corrosion, scale and microbial fouling. He holds more than 30 U.S. patents.
