= Prutton =

Prutton is a surname. Notable people with the surname include:

- Carl F. Prutton (1898–1970), American chemist and inventor
- David Prutton (born 1981), British footballer and commentator.
