= Peter Trefonas =

- Born: 1958 (age 67–68); Minneapolis, Minnesota, U.S.
- Education: University of New Orleans, University of Wisconsin-Madison
- Awards: ACS Heroes of Chemistry 2014, Perkin Medal 2016
- Scientific career
- Fields: Lithography
- Workplaces: Dow Chemical
- Doctoral advisor: Robert West

External videos
- "Peter Trefonas: Chemistry is key player in lithography process", Micro/Nano Lithography, SPIE
- "Dow Chemical - Dow AR Fast Etch Organic Bottom Antireflectant Coatings", ACS

Peter Trefonas (born 1958) is a retired DuPont Fellow (a senior scientist) at DuPont, where he had worked on the development of electronic materials. He is known for innovations in the chemistry of photolithography, particularly the development of anti-reflective coatings and polymer photoresists that are used to create circuitry for computer chips. This work has supported the patterning of smaller features during the lithographic process, increasing miniaturization and microprocessor speed.

== Education ==
Peter Trefonas is a son of Louis Marco Trefonas, also a chemist, and Gail Thames. He was inspired by Star Trek and the writings of Isaac Asimov, and created his own chemistry lab at home. Trefonas attended the University of New Orleans, receiving his Bachelor of Science in chemistry in 1980.

While an undergraduate, Trefonas earned money by writing video games for early personal computers. These included Worm, a clone of the 1976 arcade video game Blockade, and a clone of the arcade game Hustle (1977), which itself was based on Blockcade. Worm was the first of what would become many games in the snake video game genre for home computers. Trefonas also wrote a game based on Dungeons & Dragons.

Trefonas studied at the University of Wisconsin-Madison with Robert West, completing a Ph.D. in inorganic chemistry in late 1984. Trefonas became interested in electronic materials after working with West and chip makers from IBM to create organosilicon bilayer photoresists. His thesis topic was "Synthesis, properties and chemistry of organosilane and organogermane high polymers" (1985).

== Career ==
Trefonas joined MEMC Electronic Materials in late 1984. In 1986, he and others co-founded Aspect Systems Inc., utilizing photolithography technology acquired from MEMC. Trefonas worked at Aspect from 1986-1989. Then, through a succession of company acquisitions, he moved to Shipley Company (1990-2000), Rohm and Haas (1997-2008), to The Dow Chemical Company (2008-2019), and finally to DuPont (2019-current).

Trefonas has published at least 137 journal articles and technical publications. He has received 132 US patents.

== Research ==
Throughout his career, Trefonas has focused on materials science and the chemistry of photolithography. By understanding the chemistry of photoresists used in lithography, he has been able to develop anti-reflective coatings and polymer photoresists that support finely-tuned etching used in the production of integrated circuits. These materials and techniques make it possible to fit more circuits into a given area. Over time, lithographic technologies have developed to allow lithography to use smaller wavelengths of light. Trefonas has helped to overcome a number of apparent limits to the sizes that are achievable, developing photoresists that are responsive to 436-nm and 365-nm ultraviolet light, and as small as 193 nm deep.

In 1989, Trefonas and others at Aspect Systems Inc. reported on extensive studies of polyfunctional photosensitive groups in positive photoresists. They studied diazonaphthoquinone (DNQ), a chemical compound used for dissolution inhibition of novolak resin in photomask creation. They mathematically modeled effects, predicted possible optimizations, and experimentally verified their predictions. They found that chemically bonding together three of the molecules of DNQ to create a new molecule containing three dissolution inhibitors in a single molecule, led to a better feature contrast, with better resolution and miniaturization. These modified DNQs became known as "polyfunctional photoactive components" (PACs). This approach, which they termed polyphotolysis, has also been referred to as the "Trefonas Effect." The technology of trifunctional diazonaphthoquinone PACs has become the industry standard in positive photoresists. Their mechanism has been elucidated and relates to a cooperative behavior of each of the three DNQ units in the new trifunctional dissolution inhibitor molecule. Phenolic strings from the acceptor groups of PACs that are severed from their anchors may reconnect to living strings, replacing two shorter polarized strings with one longer polarized string.

Trefonas has also been a leader in the development of fast etch organic Bottom Antireflective Coating (BARC) BARC technology minimizes the reflection of light from the substrate when imaging the photoresist. Light that is used to form the latent image in the photoresist film can reflect back from the substrate and compromise feature contrast and profile shape. Controlling interference from reflected light results in the formation of a sharper pattern with less variability and a larger process window.

In 2014, Trefonas and others at Dow were named Heroes of Chemistry by the American Chemical Society, for the development of Fast Etch Organic Bottom Antireflective Coatings (BARCs). In 2016, Trefonas was recognized with The SCI Perkin Medal for outstanding contributions to industrial chemistry. In 2018, Trefonas was named as a Fellow of the SPIE for "achievements in design for manufacturing & compact modeling." Peter Trefonas was elected to the National Academy of Engineering in 2018 for the "invention of photoresist materials and microlithography methods underpinning multiple generations of microelectronics". DuPont Company in 2019 recognized Trefonas with its top recognition, the Lavoisier Medal, for "commercialized electronic chemicals which enabled customers to manufacture integrated circuits with higher density and faster speeds".

== Awards and honors ==
- 2022, "Industry Project Award" of the Institution of Chemical Engineers (IChemE)
- 2021, ACS Carothers Award
- 2019, DuPont Company Lavoisier Medal
- 2018, elected to the National Academy of Engineering
- 2018, named Fellow of the SPIE
- 2016, Perkin Medal, from the Society of Chemical Industry
- 2014, ACS Heroes of Chemistry, from the American Chemical Society (one of thirteen scientists from the Dow Chemical Company credited with the development of Dow AR Fast Etch Organic Bottom Antireflectant Coatings)
- 2013, SPIE C. Grant Willson Best Paper Award in Patterning Materials and Processes jointly with researchers at Dow and Texas A&M University, from SPIE for the paper "Bottom-up / top-down high-resolution, high-throughput lithography using vertically assembled block brush polymers".
