= David R. Bryant =

American chemist

- Born: May 8, 1936; Greensboro, North Carolina
- Died: May 10, 2025 (aged 89)
- Occupation: Organic chemist

David R. Bryant (May 8, 1936 - May 10, 2025) was an internationally acclaimed organic chemist, having worked his entire thirty-nine-year 'early career' at Union Carbide. He was inventor on some ninety patents, and a recipient of the Perkin Medal. He was a member of Renewable Algal Energy (RAE) LLC, and was working to commercialize an algae-to-oil process utilizing RAE's patent pending technology.

== Early life and education ==
Bryant grew up in Greensboro, North Carolina as one of seven children. He began working at age ten and held various jobs throughout his youth. He was influenced by his high school science teacher, Arnold Bolen, and decided to pursue chemistry in college. After graduation from high school, he earned a scholarship to Wake Forest University where he double-majored in chemistry and math. While at Wake Forest, he became a lab assistant and conducted synthetic research without the benefit of advanced instrumentation. After receiving his B.S. in 1958, Bryant pursued his Ph.D. at Duke University, with a fellowship from the National Science Foundation. Focusing on organic chemistry, with a minor in physics, he worked on the conversion of organic compounds into dianions under Charlie Hauser and received his doctorate in three years.

== Early career: Union Carbide (1961–2000) ==
After earning his Ph.D. in 1961, Bryant immediately went to work for Union Carbide Corporation. He spent the next 39 years there, retiring in 2000. His career at Union Carbide was multi-dimensional: he did fundamental research in organic chemistry in an industrial setting, contributing to Union Carbide's research and development program through his scientific innovations. His early work involved the vinyl acetate process, research on rhodium and acrylic acid work. He served as a technical witness for Union Carbide in lawsuits involving maritime arbitration, industrial accidents, and participated with the firm's attorneys in intellectual property development. He was innovative in the development of a method of producing vinyl acetate without halide, and later benzyl acetate, acrylic acid, and rhodium triphenylphosphite in the oxo process. By 1998, the oxo process had become the standard method for butanol production, with the process being used to produce over half of the world's butanol at that time.

Union Carbide recognized Bryant's leadership skills and put him on the selection team for new chemists, mentoring them throughout their careers. He was instrumental in implementing continuing education programs for all employees. He received numerous promotions and was the youngest Union Carbide appointment to Senior Corporate Fellow. He won the Union Carbide Chairman's award three times. He is listed as inventor on more than 90 U.S. patents. (Some thirteen of these were filed after his retirement from Union Carbide.) During his career at Union Carbide, he pursued approximately thirty-five different processes, nine of which reached commercial operation. Currently there are 27 licensees worldwide using technology he assisted in developing. Bryant is considered to be one of the world's experts in separating product from precious metal with the use of a homogeneous catalyst.

== Honors and awards ==
Bryant has received awards from his peers in the chemistry industry, the education community, and the state of West Virginia for his professional and civic achievements. In 1998, Bryant was awarded the Perkin Medal. The award recognized his accomplishments on a low pressure Oxo process for producing aldehydes. Bryant was interviewed in 1998 by James G. Traynham of the Chemical Heritage Foundation's Center for Oral History. He retired from Union Carbide in 2000 as a Senior Corporate Fellow.

- 1977 Kirkpatrick Award for low pressure Oxo process for the production of butyraldehyde from propylene and synthesis gas
- 1989 Chemical Pioneer Award, American Institute of Chemists
- 1990 Honorary D.Sc., Wake Forest University
- 1991 Union Carbide Chairman's Award
- 1992 Industrial Chemistry Award, American Chemical Society for outstanding technical accomplishments and leadership in industrial homogeneous catalysis and process development for the hydroformylation of olefins to Oxo products.
- 1993 Union Carbide Chairman's Award
- 1993 Carothers Award of the Delaware Section, American Chemical Society
- 1997 Union Carbide Chairman's Award
- 1998 Perkin Medal, Society of Chemical Industry (American Section)
- 2014 WF Chemistry Distinguished Alumni Award, Wake Forest University

== Publications (partial list) ==
Bryant, D. R. (2006). Classical Homogeneous Catalyst Separation Technology. In Cole-Hamilton, D. & Tooze, R. (Eds.) ISBN 1-4020-4086-5. Catalyst Separation, Recovery and Recycling: Chemistry and Process Design (pp 9–37). Dordrecht, The Netherlands: Springer.

== Patents ==
90 American patents listed at the U.S. Patent Office.
