= Elsa Reichmanis =

American chemist (born 1953)

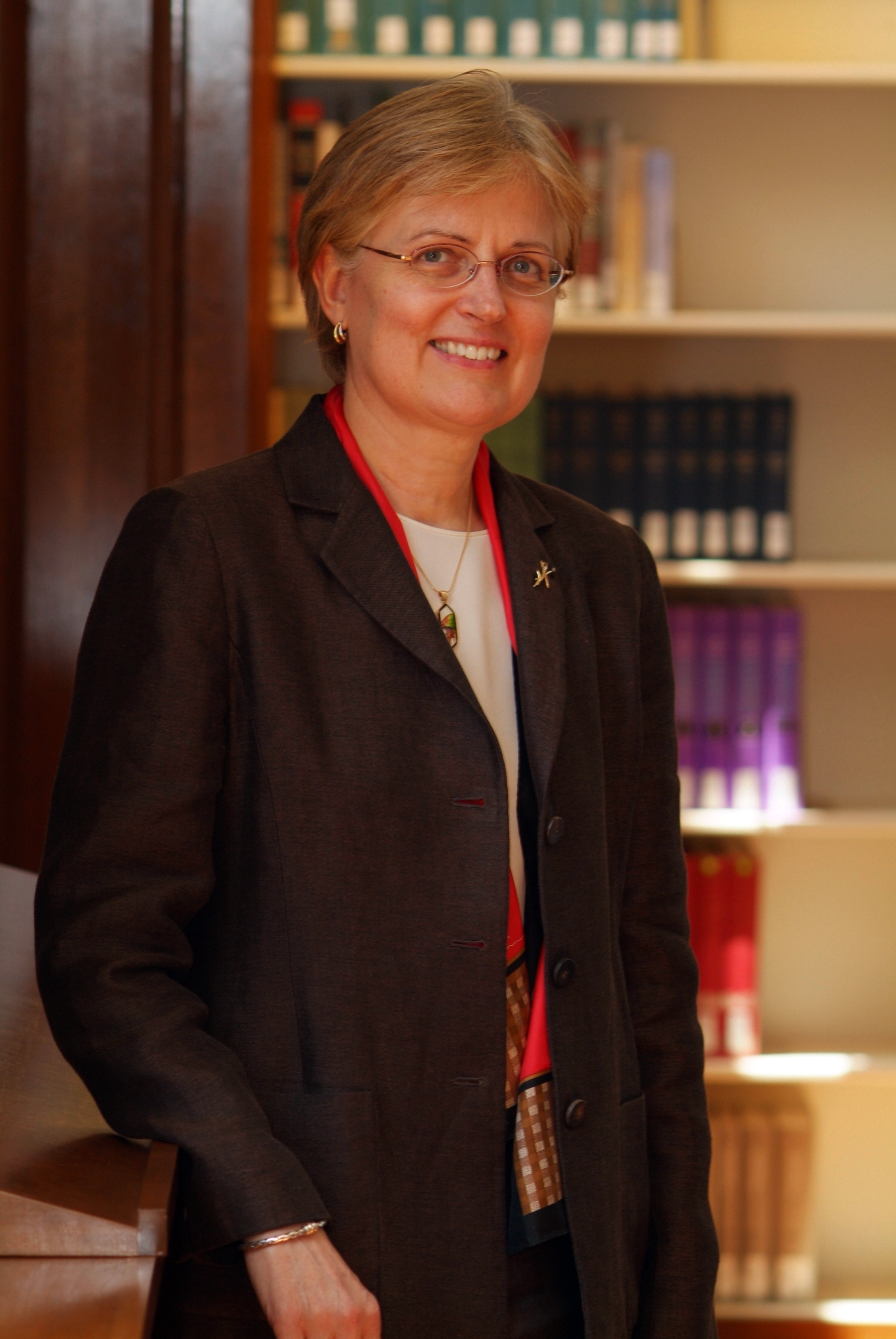
- Born: 9 December 1953 (age 72); Melbourne, Australia
- Education: Syracuse University
- Awards: Perkin Medal (2001), ACS Award in Applied Polymer Science (1999)
- Scientific career
- Fields: Chemical and biomolecular engineering
- Workplaces: Bell Labs; Lehigh University; Georgia Institute of Technology

Elsa Reichmanis (born 9 December 1953 in Melbourne, Australia) is an American chemist, who was the 2003 president of the American Chemical Society. She was elected a member of the National Academy of Engineering in 1995 for the discovery, development, and engineering leadership of new families of lithographic materials and processes that enable VLSI manufacturing. She was also inducted into the National Academy of Inventors in 2020. She is currently the Anderson Endowed Chair in Chemical and Biomolecular Engineering at Lehigh University. She previously served on the faculty at The Georgia Institute of Technology. Reichmanis is noted for her research into microlithography, and is credited for contributing to the "development of a fundamental molecular level understanding of how chemical structure affects materials function leading to new families of lithographic materials and processes that may enable advanced VLSI manufacturing".

== Education ==
Reichmanis completed her bachelor's degree in chemistry in 1972 and her PhD in organic chemistry in 1975, both at Syracuse University.

== Awards and honors ==
Reichmanis' awards and honors include:

- 1992: R&D 100 Award from Research and Development Magazine
- 1993: Achievement Award from the Society of Women Engineers
- 1995: Elected a Member of the National Academy of Engineering
- 1997: Elected Fellow of the American Association for the Advancement of Science
- 2001: Perkin Medal
- 2018: Elected a Fellow of the Materials Research Society
- 2018: ACS Award in the Chemistry of Materials
- 2020: Elected a Fellow of the National Academy of Inventors
