= Norman N. Li =

American scientist (born 1932)

- Born: December 25, 1932 (age 93); Shanghai, China
- Education: National Taiwan University (BEng); Wayne State University (MEng); Stevens Institute of Technology (PhD)
- Known for: Membrane technology Separation technology
- Awards: Perkin Medal (2000)
- Scientific career
- Fields: Chemical engineering
- Workplaces: NL Chemical Technology, Inc.

Norman N. Li (Chinese: 黎念之; pinyin: Lí Niànzhī; born December 25, 1932, in Shanghai), is a Chinese-American engineer and scientist noted for his inventions and development of liquid membrane technologies.

== Biography ==
Li graduated from the National Taiwan University in 1954. Li went to continue his study in the United States, received M.Eng in Chemical Engineering from the Wayne State University in 1957 and PhD from Stevens Institute of Technology in 1963. Dr. Li was also awarded an honorary doctorate from the New Jersey Institute of Technology

Li worked for Parke-Davis, Lawrence Berkeley National Laboratory. In 1960, Li was a lecturer at NJIT. In 1963, Li was a Senior Scientist of ExxonMobil. Li was the director of the separation technology research institute of UOP, and the director of AlliedSignal science & technology division. Li was the President of the NL Chemical Technology, Inc. based in Illinois.

== Awards and honors ==
Li has been given numerous awards and prizes or his innovation and leadership in membrane and separation technologies, including,

- 1988, the Alpha Chi Sigma Award for Chemical Engineering Research,
- 1988, the ACS Award of Separation Science and Technology,
- the Clarence G. Gerhold Award from the American Institute of Chemical Engineers (AIChE),
- 1995, the Ernest W. Thiel Award,
- 2000, the AIC Chemical Engineering Practice Award,
- 2000, the Perkin Medal from the Society of Chemical Industry,
- 2001, the Lifetime Achievement Award from the World Congress of Chemical Engineering,
- 2001, the Fujimura Award for Lifetime Achievement in International Technology Cooperation and Development
- 2006, the Founders Award from the American Institute of Chemical Engineers (AIChE).
- 2013, the Stevens Honor Award from Stevens Institute of Technology

In May 2008, Li was awarded an honorary doctorate by New Jersey Institute of Technology (NJIT). The Dr. Norman N. Li Distinguished Lecture in Chemical Engineering at the Wayne State University College of Engineering is named after him.

Li was elected to the United States National Academy of Engineering in 1990. Li is also an Academician of the Academia Sinica. Li was elected Foreign Member of the Chinese Academy of Sciences in 1998.
