= James C. Stevens =

American organometallic chemist

James Carl Stevens
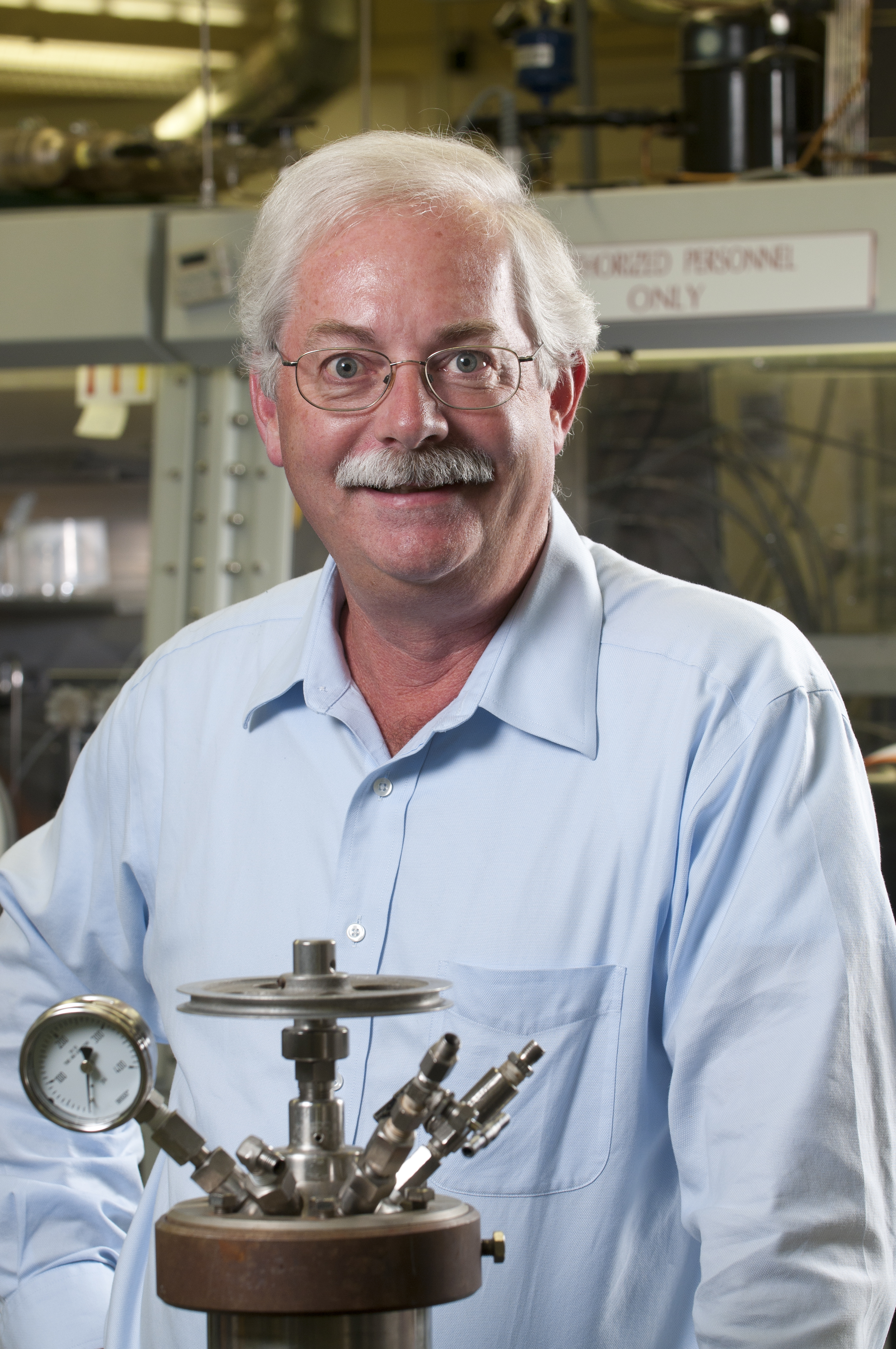
- Born: July 27, 1953 (age 73); Miami Springs, Florida
- Education: The College of Wooster (B.A. in Chemistry, 1975); Ohio State University (Ph.D. in inorganic chemistry, 1979)
- Known for: The discovery and commercialization of a number of significant families of polymers in widespread commercial use today.
- Awards: Perkin Medal (2006); US National Inventor of the Year (1994); Election to the US National Academy of Engineering (2011)
- Scientific career
- Fields: American Industrial Chemist
- Workplaces: The Dow Chemical Company
- Thesis: Synthetic and Physical Inorganic chemistry of monomeric molecular oxygen complexes (1979)
- Doctoral advisor: Daryle Busch

James Carl Stevens (born July 27, 1953), a chemist, was the first Distinguished Fellow at the Dow Chemical Company, retiring in January 2015. His area of expertise is organometallic chemistry and his primary field of research is in the area of polyolefin catalysis, particularly in the area of polyethylene, polypropylene, ethylene/styrene copolymers, and the combinatorial discovery of organometallic single-site catalysts. Stevens major contributions have come in the discovery and commercial implementation of single-site polyolefin catalysts. He invented and led the commercialization of constrained geometry catalyst for the polymerization of olefins. These have been commercialized by Dow as a number of polymers, elastomers and plostomers.

Stevens led efforts in the development of photovoltaic materials based on earth abundant elements prior to his retirement.

== Education ==
Born in Miami Springs, Florida, Stevens received his bachelor's in chemistry from The College of Wooster in 1975 and his Ph.D. from Ohio State University in 1979 where he studied with Daryle Busch. His thesis topic was Synthetic and Physical Inorganic chemistry of monomeric molecular oxygen complexes. In 2011, Stevens received an Honorary Doctor of Letters from Texas A&M University.

== Advancements to chemistry ==
Stevens is known primarily for the discovery and commercialization of a number of significant families of polymers in widespread commercial use today. This discovery can be found in many forms of consumer products including plastic wine corks; shoe and sneaker insoles; casual plastic footwear (such as Crocs); automobile parts (dashboards, bumpers, hoses, gaskets); food wraps and films like poultry bags; synthetic EPDM rubber, hot melt adhesives and more.

Stevens discovered and led the implementation of many families of new single site catalysts, cocatalysts, and new polymers. His discovery of constrained geometry catalysts (see Constrained geometry complex), single-site catalysts for olefin polymerization, today accounts for the production of over 2 billion pounds of polymers per year. In addition, the control over molecular structure imparted by these discoveries allows the production of a large breadth of polymers covering a wide array of applications. In a series of studies, Stevens and his coworkers were able to demonstrate that these catalysts had an unusual ability to incorporate long-chain branches into polyethylene, leading to a new class of highly processable ethylene copolymers (US Patent 5,272,236 (and others)).

Olefin polymerization catalysis is important because polyolefins are the largest volume thermoplastics produced worldwide. Catalyst structure controls polymer microstructure, which ultimately determines macromolecular properties and applications. Ziegler and Natta won the Nobel Prize for the original discoveries in olefin polymerization catalysis. These catalysts are poorly understood, possess a range of activities within a particular batch of catalyst and are limited in terms of precise control of polymer architecture. Homogeneous, molecular-based or “single site” olefin polymerization catalysts have their genesis in the 1950s, with the early discoveries of Breslow and Newberg of Group 4 metallocenes activated with aluminum alkyls. The discoveries of MAO and fluorinated aryl borate cocatalysts reenergized this field, leading to the promise of precise control of molecular architecture for these commercially important polymers.

Stevens was among the first to recognize the potential of combinatorial chemistry and high-throughput screening in the discovery of olefin polymerization catalysts. Stevens’ work here led to an amazing hafnium-based catalyst family (few experts would have believed a hafnium complex would have the needed activity) that enables the polymerization of propylene to isotactic polymers and copolymers in a high temperature solution process. In a series of papers and patents starting in 2002, Stevens, along with colleagues and collaborators, disclosed new catalysts which are non-conventional, counter-intuitive, subtle, and have an unprecedented stereoselectivity along with remarkable high temperature performance. This discovery has led to another family of new propene-based polyolefins and a process for the large-scale production of new thermoplastic and elastomeric materials. The resulting polymers have been commercialized under the VERSIFY tradename.

His group developed a “chain-shuttling” processes in which polyolefin chains are rapidly exchanged between two single-site catalytic centers to create, catalytically for the first time, olefin block copolymers with thousands of polymer chains produced per catalyst molecule. This remarkable advance was described in a Science paper and is the basis for the successful INFUSE polymer line.

Stevens invented or contributed significantly to the commercialization of a large number of commercial products, including AFFINITY™ polyolefin plastomers, ENGAGE™ polyolefin elastomers, ELITE™ enhanced polyethylene resins, NORDEL-MG™ EPDM rubber, NORDEL-IP™ elastomers, Dow XLA-fibers, INDEX™ ethylene/styrene copolymers, VERSIFY™ propylene copolymers, and INFUSE™ Olefin Block Copolymers. He is an inventor on 100 issued US patents, over 1,100 foreign patents, has 18 publications, and is the editor or author of two books.

== Awards and achievements ==
Stevens has been issued over 100 US patents, been featured in 18 scientific publications, and is the editor of one book.

Stevens has received many honors during his career including:

- 2015 American Chemical Society Heroes of Chemistry
- 2013 Named the first Distinguished Fellow of the Dow Chemical Company
- 2011 Elected as a member into the National Academy of Engineering
- 2010 Eugene J. Houdry Award in Applied Catalysis from the North American Catalysis Society
- 2007 University of Chicago Bloch Medal
- 2006 The Dow Chemical Company Herbert H. Dow Medal
- 2006 ACS National Award in Industrial Chemistry
- 2006 Ben Gurion Medal – Ben Gurion University of the Negev, Israel
- 2006 Perkin Medal in recognition of his contributions to the development of olefin polymerization catalysts, including the INSITE process.
- 2004 Carothers Award honoring scientific innovators who have made outstanding advances and contributions to industrial chemistry
- 2003 Brazosport Section of the American Chemical Society “Scientific Achievement Award”
- 2001 National Medal of Technology was awarded to Dow Chemical, in part for the development of INSITE catalysis which Stevens invented.
- 1994 National Inventor of the Year by the Intellectual Property Owners Association
- 1985, 1989, 1992, and twice in 1993: Inventor of the Year Award at The Dow Chemical Company

Polymers based on technology he developed have won seven R&D 100 Awards:

- 1994 INSITE™ process
- 1999 ELITE™ enhance polyethylene resins
- 2000 INDEX™ interpolymers
- 2001 INSPIRE™ performance polymers
- 2003 XLA™ fibers
- 2005 VERSIFY™ plastomers and elastomers
- 2009 INFUSE™ olefin block copolymers

INFUSE™ olefin block copolymers also were named the 2012 ICIS Innovation Award Winner
