= Charles Stine =

American chemist (1882–1954)

Charles Milton Altland Stine (18 October 1882 – 28 May 1954) was a chemist and a vice-president of DuPont who created the laboratory from which nylon and other significant inventions were made. He was also a devout Christian who authored a book about religion and science.

Stine was born in Norwich, Connecticut to Lutheran clergyman Milton Henry Stine and his wife Mary Jane Altland. He received his BS and MS degrees from Gettysburg college and then received a Ph.D. from Johns Hopkins University in 1907, Stine began work in DuPont's research laboratories on a project to make explosives safer to handle. With C.C. Ahlum, he used sodium sulfite as a purifying agent to crystallize trinitrotoluol (TNT). After studying the leakage of liquid components from dynamite, Stine was able to develop a more stable version of the explosive for use in mining. He developed improved methods for manufacture of ammonium nitrate, extraction of tetryl from dimethylaniline, picric acid from chlorobenzene, and for chlorinating benzene. During the 1920s, synthetic resins were developed in his laboratories, and improved processes were found for manufacturing nitric acid and sulfuric acid.

After becoming director of DuPont's Chemicals Department in 1924, Dr. Stine was able to hire Dr. Wallace Carothers away from teaching at Harvard University. Stine lobbied DuPont management for a budget exclusively devoted to speculative research. In 1930, he succeeded in obtaining a $300,000 annual allocation, and focused with Carothers on colloid chemistry and the development of polymers. Outcomes of the long range research included a synthetic, chloroprene rubber, but the most notable invention came in 1938 with the invention of nylon.

In 1942 when General Leslie Groves first proposed that du Pont take over plutonium production for the Manhattan Project both Vice President Willis Harrington and chemist Dr Stine protested that the company had no experience or knowledge of physics and that they were incompetent to render any opinion except that the entire project seemed beyond human capability. But du Pont went on to construct and operate the Hanford site.

Among his awards were the Perkin Medal in 1940 and the Lavoisier Medal for Technical Achievement in 1997.

The Charles M.A. Stine Award of the AIChE is awarded annually by their Materials Engineering and Sciences Division. DuPont's Stine Laboratory in Newark, Delaware, is named in his honor.

The son of a minister, Stine also wrote a book about his faith and his work as a scientist, entitled A Chemist and His Bible, published in 1943. Stine died in 1954 at Wilmington, Delaware, aged 72.
