= Perkin Medal =

Chemistry award

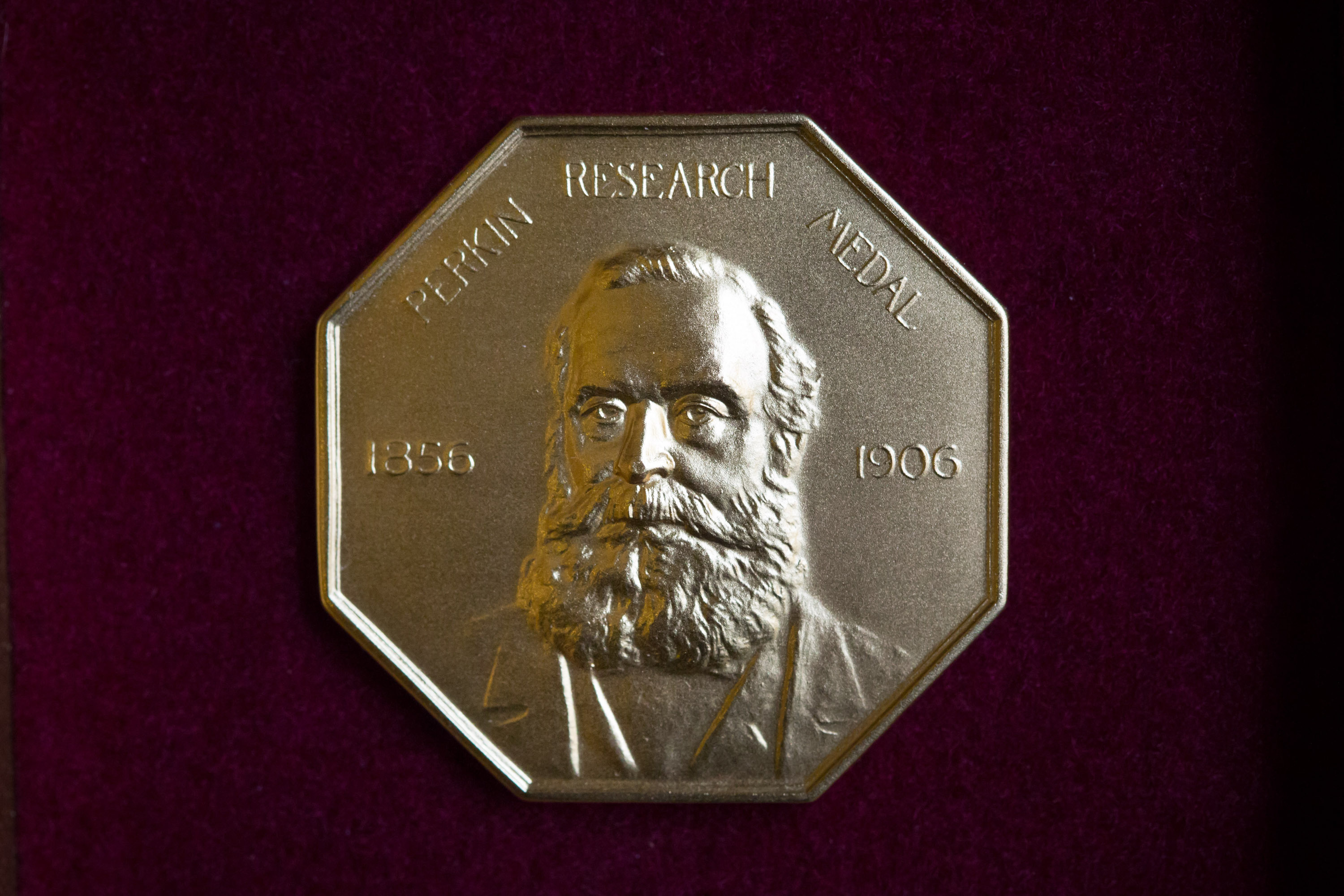
- Awarded for: Given annually in the United States for an "innovation in applied chemistry resulting in outstanding commercial development."
- Sponsored by: Society of Chemical Industry America
- Date: 1906
- Country: United States
- Presented by: Society of Chemical Industry (American Section)
- Website: https://sci-america.org/awards/#perkin

The Perkin Medal is an award given annually by the Society of Chemical Industry (American Section) to a scientist residing in The United States for an "innovation in applied chemistry resulting in outstanding commercial development." It is considered the highest honor given in the US chemical industry.

The Perkin Medal was first awarded in 1906 to commemorate the 50th anniversary of the discovery of mauveine, the world's first synthetic aniline dye, by Sir William Henry Perkin, an English chemist. The award was given to Sir William on the occasion of his visit to the United States in the year before he died. The first medal was presented to Perkin at a banquet held by the Society of Chemical Industry in New York. It was next given in 1908 and has been given every year since then.

== Recipients ==
- 1906 Sir William H. Perkin
- 1908 John Brown Francis Herreshoff
- 1909 Arno Behr
- 1910 Edward G. Acheson
- 1911 Charles M. Hall
- 1912 Herman Frasch
- 1913 James Gayley
- 1914 John W. Hyatt
- 1915 Edward Weston
- 1916 Leo H. Baekeland
- 1917 Ernst Twitchell
- 1918 Auguste J. Rossi
- 1919 Frederick G. Cottrell
- 1920 Charles F. Chandler
- 1921 Willis R. Whitney
- 1922 William M. Burton
- 1923 Milton C. Whitaker
- 1924 Frederick M. Becket
- 1925 Hugh K. Moore
- 1926 Richard B. Moore
- 1927 John E. Teeple
- 1928 Irving Langmuir
- 1929 Eugene C. Sullivan
- 1930 Herbert H. Dow
- 1931 Arthur D. Little
- 1932 Charles F. Burgess
- 1933 George Oenslager
- 1934 Colin G. Fink
- 1935 George O. Curme Jr.
- 1936 Warren K. Lewis
- 1937 Thomas Midgley Jr.
- 1938 Frank J. Tone
- 1939 Walter S. Landis
- 1940 Charles M. A. Stine
- 1941 John V. N. Dorr
- 1942 Martin Ittner
- 1943 Robert E. Wilson
- 1944 Gaston F. Dubois
- 1945 Elmer K. Bolton
- 1946 Francis C. Frary
- 1947 Robert R. Williams
- 1948 Clarence W. Balke
- 1949 Carl S. Miner
- 1950 Eger V. Murphree
- 1951 Henry Howard
- 1952 Robert M. Burns
- 1953 Charles A. Thomas
- 1954 Roger Adams
- 1955 Roger Williams
- 1956 Edgar C. Britton
- 1957 Glenn T. Seaborg
- 1958 William J. Kroll
- 1959 Eugene J. Houdry
- 1960 Karl Folkers
- 1961 Carl F. Prutton
- 1962 Eugene G. Rochow
- 1963 William O. Baker
- 1964 William J. Sparks
- 1965 Carl S. Marvel
- 1966 Manson Benedict
- 1967 Vladimir Haensel
- 1968 Henry B. Hass
- 1969 Robert W. Cairns
- 1970 Milton Harris
- 1971 James F. Hyde
- 1972 Robert Burns MacMullin
- 1973 Theodore L. Cairns
- 1974 Edwin H. Land
- 1975 Carl Djerassi
- 1976 Lewis H. Sarett
- 1977 Paul J. Flory
- 1978 Donald F. Othmer
- 1979 James D. Idol Jr.
- 1980 Herman F. Mark
- 1981 Ralph Landau
- 1982 Herbert C. Brown
- 1983 N. Bruce Hannay
- 1984 John H. Sinfelt
- 1985 Paul B. Weisz
- 1986 Peter Regna
- 1987 J. Paul Hogan and Robert L. Banks
- 1988 James F. Roth
- 1989 Frederick J. Karol
- 1990 John E. Franz
- 1991 Miguel A. Ondetti
- 1992 Edith M. Flanigen
- 1993 Lubomyr T. Romankiw
- 1994 Marinus Los
- 1995 Delbert H. Meyer
- 1996 Marion D. Francis
- 1997 Stephanie Kwolek
- 1998 David R. Bryant
- 1999 Albert A. Carr
- 2000 Norman N. Li
- 2001 Elsa Reichmanis
- 2002 Paul S. Anderson
- 2003 William H. Joyce
- 2004 Gordon E. Moore
- 2005 Robert W. Gore
- 2006 James C. Stevens
- 2007 Herbert Boyer
- 2008 Ian Shankland
- 2009 Richard B. Silverman
- 2010 Ronald Breslow
- 2011 Rodney H. Banks
- 2012 Robert S. Langer
- 2013 Bruce Roth
- 2014 John C. Warner
- 2015 Cynthia A. Maryanoff
- 2016 Peter Trefonas
- 2017 Ann E. Weber
- 2018 Barbara Haviland Minor
- 2019 Chad Mirkin
- 2020 Jane Frommer
- 2022 Dennis Liotta
- 2023 Frances Arnold
- 2024 Max P. McDaniel
- 2025 Bruce DeBruin
- 2026 Jennifer Doudna

== See also ==
- List of chemistry awards
