= Stephanie Kwolek =

American chemist who invented Kevlar (1923–2014)

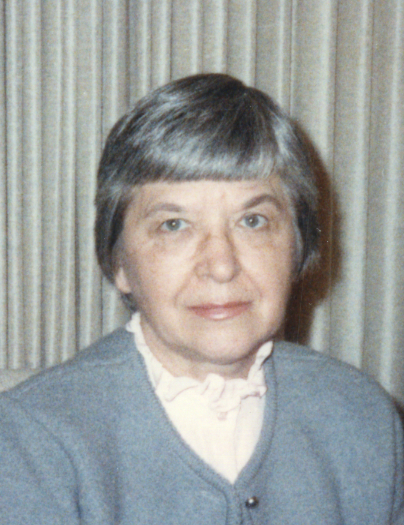
- Kwolek in 1986
- Born: Stephanie Louise Kwolek; July 31, 1923; New Kensington, Pennsylvania, U.S.
- Died: June 18, 2014 (aged 90); Talleyville, Delaware, U.S.
- Education: Carnegie Mellon University
- Known for: Invention of Kevlar
- Awards: Howard N. Potts Medal (1976); Chemical Pioneer Award (1980); Lavoisier Medal (1995); National Inventors Hall of Fame (1995); National Medal of Technology and Innovation (1996); IRI Achievement Award (1997); Perkin Medal (1997); National Women's Hall of Fame (2003)
- Scientific career
- Fields: Polymer chemistry

Stephanie Louise Kwolek (/ˈkwoʊlɛk/; July 31, 1923 – June 18, 2014) was a Polish-American chemist known for inventing Kevlar (poly-paraphenylene terephthalamide). Her career at the DuPont company spanned more than 40 years.

For her discovery, Kwolek was awarded the DuPont company's Lavoisier Medal for outstanding technical achievement. Before 2021, she was the only female employee to have received that honor. In 1995 she became the fourth woman to be added to the National Inventors Hall of Fame. Kwolek won numerous awards for her work in polymer chemistry, including the National Medal of Technology, the IRI Achievement Award and the Perkin Medal.

== Early life and education ==
External videos
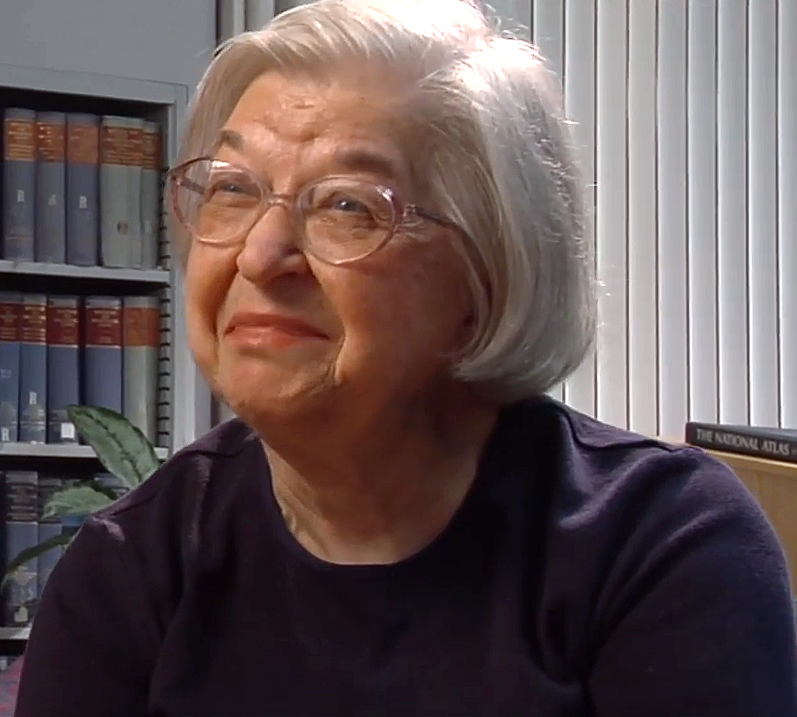
- Stephanie Kwolek, "I don't think there's anything like saving someone's life to bring you satisfaction and happiness", Science History Institute

Kwolek was one of two children born to Polish immigrant parents in the Pittsburgh suburb of New Kensington, Pennsylvania, in 1923. The grade school she attended was small enough to require her classroom be shared by two different grades, which she found to be an advantage; as Kwolek's love of science grew, she easily outpaced even the older children across the room. Her father, John Kwolek, died when she was ten years old. He was a naturalist by avocation, and Kwolek spent hours with him, as a child, exploring the natural world. They would spend afternoons together exploring the woods nearby, collecting plants and observing animals that they would later name and characterize in a scrapbook. She attributed her interest in science to him and an interest in fashion design to her mother Nellie (née Zajdel), who worked as a seamstress. Her mother told her that she was too much of a perfectionist to work a career in fashion, so Stephanie decided to become a physician.

In 1946, Stephanie earned a Bachelor of Science degree in chemistry from Margaret Morrison Carnegie College of Carnegie Mellon University. She had planned to become a physician and hoped she could earn enough money from a temporary job in a chemistry-related field to attend medical school.

== DuPont career ==
Kwolek was offered a position at DuPont's Buffalo, New York, facility in 1946 by William Hale Charch, a future mentor. During her interview with DuPont, Dr. Charch had said the company would reach out to her in about two weeks to tell her whether she had secured the job. Kwolek asked if they could possibly respond sooner because she had to notify another company if she would accept their offer. Charch then called in his receptionist to dictate Kwolek's offer letter in front of her.[

As a chemical company, DuPont was trying to find a petroleum-based polymer fiber that would be lighter and harder-wearing than steel in radial tires. The firm had vacancies, given that many men had been overseas fighting in World War II. DuPont had introduced nylon shortly before the war, and that business boomed and blossomed into several textile applications.

At the same time, the protracted second World War emphasized the need for a lightweight, wearable armor to protect personnel and equipment. As the war raged overseas, soldiers engaged in battle had to do without body armor because there was no material strong enough to stop a rifle bullet but light enough to wear in battle. Steel was the only armor material available, and its weight limited its use to armored vehicles. Even then, steel could be pierced by specialized armor-piercing ammunition.

Although Kwolek intended to work for DuPont temporarily, in order to raise money for further study, the polymer research she worked on was so interesting and challenging that she decided to drop her plans for medical school and make chemistry a lifetime career. Her research group moved to Wilmington, Delaware, in 1950. In 1959, she won a publication award from the American Chemical Society (ACS), the first of many awards. The paper, "The Nylon Rope Trick", demonstrated a way of producing nylon in a beaker at room temperature. It is still a common classroom experiment, and the process was extended to high molecular weight polyamides. In 1985, Kwolek and coworkers patented a method for preparing PBO and PBT polymers. Because DuPont was at the cutting edge of polymer technology and innovation, Kwolek never outgrew the position and spent her whole career doing research at Dupont. Over her 40-year career, Kwolek would file 28 patents. In addition to Kevlar, she contributed to products such as Spandex (Lycra), Nomex, and Kapton. She continued as a consultant to Dupont after her retirement in 1986, and became the first woman to earn the company’s Lavoisier medal for research in 1995.

She was engaged in the search for new polymers as well as a new condensation process that takes place at lower temperatures around 0 to 40 °C (32 to 104 °F). The melt condensation polymerization process used in preparing nylon, for example, was instead done at more than 200 °C (392 °F). The lower-temperature polycondensation processes, which employ very fast-reacting intermediates, make it possible to prepare polymers that cannot be melted and only begin to decompose at temperatures above 400 °C (752 °F).

=== Kevlar ===
Kwolek is best known for her work during the 1950s and 1960s with aramids, or "aromatic polyamides", a type of polymer that can be made into strong, stiff, and flame-resistant fibres. Her laboratory work in aramids was conducted under the supervision of research fellow Paul W. Morgan, who calculated that the aramids would form stiff fibres owing to the presence of bulky benzene (or "aromatic") rings in their molecular chains but that they would have to be prepared from solution because they melt only at very high temperatures. Kwolek determined the solvents and polymerization conditions suitable for producing poly-m-phenylene isophthalamide, a compound that DuPont released in 1961, as a flame-resistant fibre with the trade name Nomex. She then extended her work into poly-p-benzamide and poly-p-phenylene terephthalamide, which she noted adopted highly regular rodlike molecular arrangements in solution. From these two "liquid crystal polymers" (the first ever prepared), fibres were spun that displayed unprecedented stiffness and tensile strength. The innovative polymer Poly-p-phenylene terephthalamide, as invented by Kwolek, was released commercially under the name Kevlar.

In 1964, in anticipation of a gasoline shortage, Kwolek's group began searching for a lightweight yet strong fiber to replace the steel used in tires. The polymers she had been working with, poly-p-phenylene terephthalate and polybenzamide, formed liquid crystal while in solution that at the time had to be melt-spun at over 200 °C (392 °F), which produced weaker and less stiff fibers. A unique technique in her new projects and the melt-condensation polymerization process was to reduce those temperatures to between the range of 0 and 40 °C (32 and 104 °F).

As she explained in a 1993 speech:

The solution was unusually (low viscosity), turbid, stir-opalescent and buttermilk in appearance. Conventional polymer solutions are usually clear or translucent and have the viscosity of molasses, more or less. The solution that I prepared looked like a dispersion but was totally filterable through a fine pore filter. This was a liquid crystalline solution, but I did not know it at the time.

This sort of cloudy solution was usually thrown away. Kwolek was denied the use of the spinneret for her solution because it was thought the solution would clog the machine. However, Kwolek persuaded technician Charles Smullen, who ran the spinneret, to test her solution. She was amazed to find that the new fiber would not break when nylon typically would. Not only was it stronger than nylon, Kevlar was five times stronger than steel by weight. Both her supervisor and the laboratory director understood the significance of her discovery, and a new field of polymer chemistry quickly arose. By 1971, modern Kevlar was introduced. Kwolek learned that the fibers could be made even stronger by heat-treating them. The polymer molecules, shaped like rods or matchsticks, are highly oriented, which gives Kevlar its extraordinary strength. Kwolek continued research of thermotropic Kevlar derivatives containing aliphatic and chlorine groups.

=== Applications of Kevlar ===
Kwolek was not much involved in developing practical applications of Kevlar. Once senior DuPont managers were informed of the discovery, "they immediately assigned a whole group to work on different aspects", she said. Still, Kwolek continued research on Kevlar derivatives. She did not profit from DuPont's products, as she signed over the Kevlar patent to the company.

Kevlar is used in more than 200 applications, including tennis rackets, skis, parachute lines, boats, airplanes, ropes, cables, and bullet-proof vests. It has been used for car tires, fire fighter boots, hockey sticks, cut-resistant gloves and armored cars. It has also been used for protective building materials like bomb-proof materials, hurricane safe rooms, and bridge reinforcements. During the week of Kwolek's death, the one millionth bullet-resistant vest made with Kevlar was sold. Kevlar is also used to build cell phone cases; Motorola's Droid RAZR has a Kevlar unibody.

Kevlar is used as a lightweight body armor for police and the military. It also protects undersea optical-fiber cables, aids in bridge suspension, and is used in protective layers in canoes, drumheads, and frying pans.

== Advocacy for women in science and legacy in STEM education ==
Beyond her scientific achievements, Stephanie Kwolek was a passionate advocate for increasing women's participation in science, technology, engineering, and mathematics (STEM). As one of the few women chemists working at DuPont during the mid-20th century, Kwolek often spoke about the challenges she faced in a male-dominated field and sought to encourage young women to pursue careers in science.

After her retirement, Kwolek volunteered her time to mentor students and deliver talks about chemistry in classrooms across the country. She believed in the importance of hands-on science education and frequently demonstrated experiments such as the "nylon rope trick" to engage students—especially girls—in the wonders of chemistry. Her outreach helped demystify science for young audiences and inspired many to view STEM as a creative and impactful field.

Kwolek also worked with organizations such as the National Academy of Sciences and the National Research Council to promote diversity in scientific disciplines and to advise on science education policy. She served on panels that focused on innovation and the role of women in research, lending her voice to the push for broader inclusion in science and technology professions.

The Royal Society of Chemistry's decision to name a biennial award after her—the Stephanie L. Kwolek Award—underscores her lasting influence not only as a chemist but also as a role model. The award honors outstanding contributions in materials chemistry from scientists working outside the United Kingdom, and its establishment reflects her global impact.

Kwolek's life and career are now taught in many classrooms as part of broader efforts to bring underrepresented figures into STEM curricula. She is frequently included in lists of pioneering women in science and is regarded as an example of perseverance, intellectual rigor, and the importance of representation in research and innovation.

== Awards, honors, and legacy ==
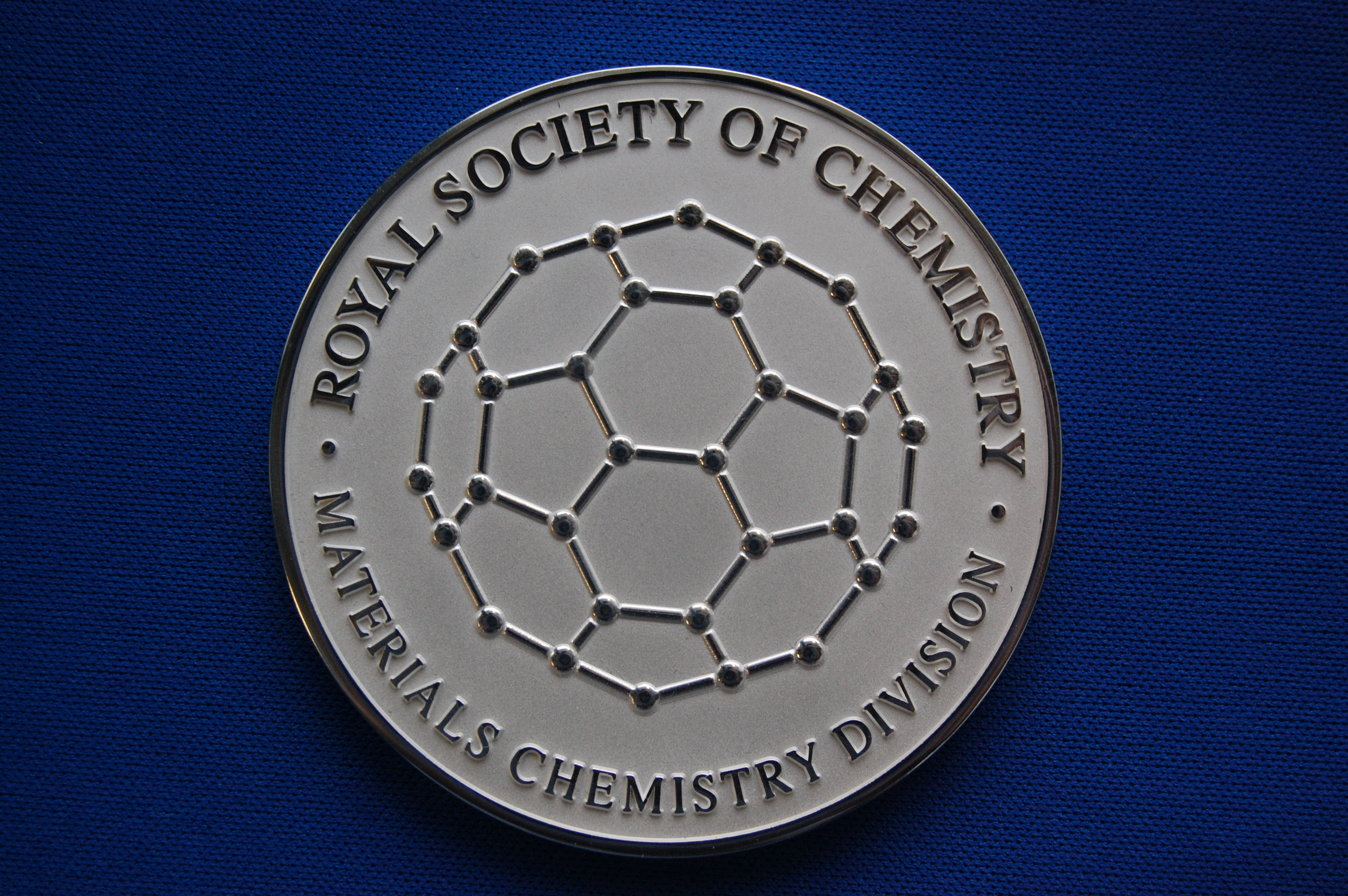
Royal Society of Chemistry – Stephanie L Kwolek Award (2014)

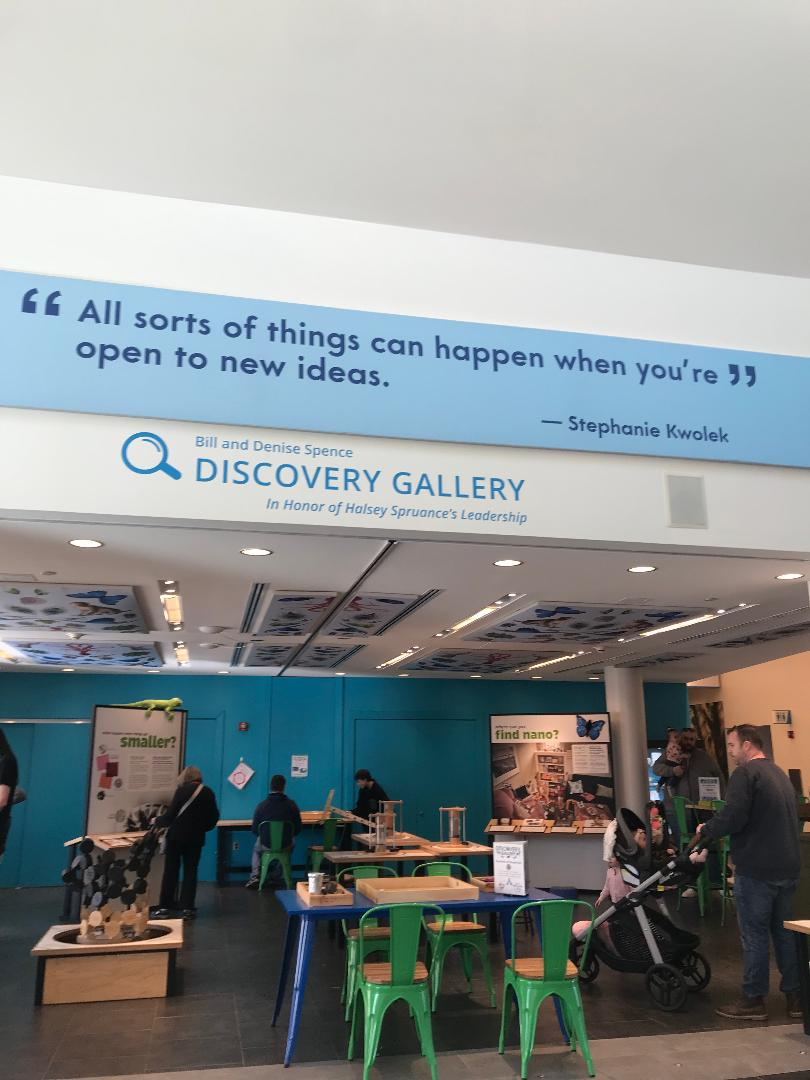
A quote by Stephanie Kwolek, photographed in 2024 inside the Delaware Museum of Nature & Science

For her discovery of Kevlar, Kwolek was awarded the DuPont company's Lavoisier Medal for outstanding technical achievement in 1995, as a "Persistent experimentalist and role model whose discovery of liquid crystalline polyamides led to Kevlar aramid fibers." At the time of her death in 2014, she was still the only female employee to receive that honor. Her discovery generated several billion dollars of revenue for DuPont, but she never benefited directly from it financially.

In 1980, Kwolek received the Chemical Pioneer Award from the American Institute of Chemists, and an Award for Creative Invention from the American Chemical Society. In 1995, Kwolek was added to the National Inventors Hall of Fame. In 1996, she received the National Medal of Technology and the IRI Achievement Award. In 1997, she received the Perkin Medal from the American Chemical Society. In 2003, she was inducted into the National Women's Hall of Fame. In 2019, Time created 89 new covers to celebrate women of the year starting from 1920; it chose Kwolek for 1966.

She was awarded honorary degrees by Carnegie Mellon University (2001), Worcester Polytechnic Institute (1981) and Clarkson University (1997).

The Royal Society of Chemistry grants a biennial 'Stephanie L Kwolek Award', "to recognise exceptional contributions to the area of materials chemistry from a scientist working outside the UK".

Kwolek is featured as one of the Royal Society of Chemistry's 175 Faces of Chemistry.

== Later life ==
During her 40 years as a research scientist, she received 17 patents.

In 1986, Kwolek retired as a research associate for DuPont. Toward the end of her life, she consulted for DuPont and served on both the National Research Council and the National Academy of Sciences.

After retirement, Kwolek dedicated herself to science education and outreach. She regularly visited classrooms to demonstrate chemistry experiments and inspire students, especially young girls, to pursue STEM careers. She also remained active in professional organizations, advocating for women in science and offering mentorship to early-career chemists. She continued writing about scientific demonstrations and remained intellectually engaged until her death.

Kwolek died at the age of 90 in Talleyville, Delaware, on June 18, 2014. She was a practicing Catholic and her funeral was held at St. Joseph on the Brandywine Catholic Church in Greenville, Delaware.

== See also ==
- Women in science
- Women in science, engineering and technology
