= James Gayley =

American steel metallurgist (1855–1920)

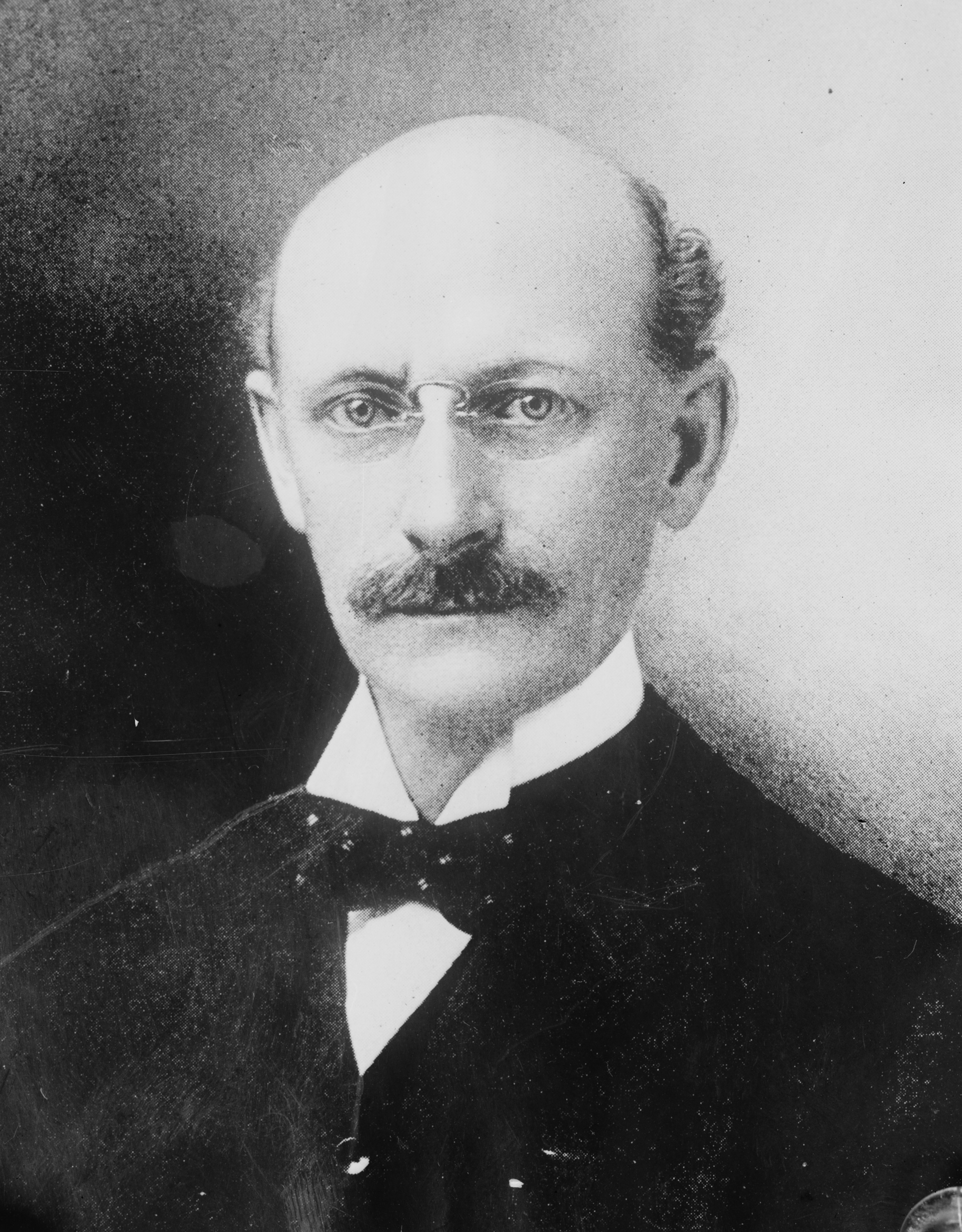
- Born: October 11, 1855; Lock Haven, Pennsylvania, U.S.
- Died: February 25, 1920 (aged 64); New York City, U.S.
- Education: Lafayette College
- Occupations: Steel director, metallurgist
- Known for: Inventor of the dry air blast Director of the Carnegie Steel Company; First vice-president of U.S. Steel

James Gayley (October 11, 1855 – February 25, 1920) was an American chemist and steel metallurgist who served as managing director of the Carnegie Steel Company, and as the first vice president of U.S. Steel from 1901 to 1908. He is credited with many inventions which greatly improved the fields of steel and iron making. For his contributions in the field of metallurgy, he was awarded the Elliott Cresson Medal in 1909, and the Perkin Medal in 1913.

== Early life ==
Gayley was born on October 11, 1855, in Lock Haven, Pennsylvania, to Samuel and Agnes Gayley; Samuel was a Presbyterian minister who emigrated to the United States from Ireland at around 1840. Gayley spent much of his youth in West Nottingham, Maryland, where he attended West Nottingham Academy. He entered Lafayette College at age 16, where he graduated with a degree in mining engineering in 1876.

== Career ==
Gayley spent much of his early career working at various iron and steel companies throughout the northern United States. He began his career working for the Crane Iron Company as a chemist, a position he held for three years with an annual salary of $500. After leaving he spent two and a half years as a superintendent at the Missouri Furnace Company. Gayley left this job to assume a management position at the E&G Brooke Iron Company in Birdsboro, where he worked for another three years.

In 1885, Gayley began working for Andrew Carnegie at the Edgar Thomson Steel Works in Braddock, where he incorporated fuel saving strategies and introduced new appliances to the mills which significantly altered the steel making process. One such invention incorporated charging bins which would mix, rather than heap, the various materials used in steel processing, allowing the ingredients to burn more evenly while using less fuel. Another was a compound condensing blowing engine to force more air into blast furnaces, enhancing combustion. Additionally, he installed the first mechanical ore loader and the vessels necessary for their use. These changes were described by the American Institute of Mining Engineers (AIME) as "bringing American blast-furnace practice up to a plane never before attained." For leading these improvements, Gayley was given the post of General Superintendent to the entire Edger Thomson plant, and by 1897 became the managing director of the Carnegie Steel Company.

One of the most important of Gayley's inventions was his device which prevented water vapor in the air from entering the furnace - a process he called the "dry-air blast". The dry air blast sought to prevent excess water vapor in the air from entering the furnace where pig iron was being produced. Humid air contains a certain amount of vapor which is detrimental to the quality of the pig iron produced; this is a particular problem in iron-producing centers in regions with high humidity. Gayley was the first to mount a condenser within the blast engine of a furnace which removed the moisture from the air. Using the dry-air blast, production yields increased by as much as 20%. After its inception, this process was described as one of the "greatest achievements in modern metallurgical chemistry" by members of the Perkin Medal committee.

Gayley was closely connected with Carnegie for much of his professional life, and was part of Carnegie's board of managers during the final years of Carnegie Steel. Due to his prolific involvement and as recognition of his services, Gayley was appointed as the company's first vice president when Carnegie Steel merged to form the United States Steel Corporation in 1901. At his new position, he oversaw the shipping and transportation of ore, in upwards of 30,000,000 tons annually. Gayley served in this capacity until his resignation in 1908 due to illness.

=== Memberships ===
Gayley became a member of the AIME in 1880. Between 1896 and 1905, he acquired the positions of manager, vice president and president successively. He then assumed the role as president of the Board of Directors from 1905 to 1911. Gayley stayed on the board as a director until 1913.

Gayley was a member of both the American and the British Iron and Steel Institute, and the Lafayette College Board of Trustees from 1892 until his death in 1920.

== Bibliography ==
Gayley made many contributions to the technical literature of metallurgy and other sciences, which were published three times per year in "transactions" by the American Institute of Mining Engineers.

- A Chilled Blast-furnace Hearth (1886), James Gayley
- Development of American Blast Furnaces, with Special Reference to Large Yields (1891), James Gayley
- The Preservation of the Heart and Bosh Walls of the Blast Furnace (1893), James Gayley
- Application of Dry-air Blast to the Manufacture of Iron (1906), James Gayley

== Legacy ==
Gayley Hall on the campus of Lafayette College

For his inventions and techniques developed in iron and steel, Gayley was recognized by his peers as one of the "most highly qualified technical experts in the steel industry." He was described by The New York Times as the "pig iron king" for holding the "world's record for making the most iron with the least coke." Additionally, metallurgist Hermann Alexander Brassert described him as the "father of modern American blast-furnace practice".

Gayley was awarded with an Honorary Degree of Doctor of Science from the University of Pennsylvania in 1906, and from Lehigh University in 1912. In 1909, he was awarded the Elliott Cresson Medal by the Franklin Institute in engineering for his invention of the dry-air blast. Four years later, in 1913, he received the Perkin Medal from the Society of Chemical Industry (American Section).

Gayley donated a building, Gayley Laboratory of Chemistry and Metallurgy, to his alma mater Lafayette College on April 5, 1902. His father gave the dedication prayer at the ceremony. Known commonly as Gayley Hall, it was razed in 1960 to make room for a new campus library building.

== Personal life ==
In 1884 Gayley married Julia Thurston, a descendant of Myles Standish. They had three children together, Mary Thurston, and Agnes Malcolm, and Florence. The couple divorced in 1908.

Gayley was an active Presbyterian his entire life. He died in 1920 in New York City following complications from heart trouble.
