= Lavoisier Medal =

Chemistry award

The Lavoisier Medal is an award named for Antoine Lavoisier, often described as the father of modern chemistry.

At least three organizations independently give awards for achievement in chemical-related disciplines, each using the name Lavoisier Medal. Lavoisier Medals are awarded by the following organizations:

== French Chemical Society (Société Chimique de France (SCF)) ==
The French Chemical Society's Médaille Lavoisier is given for work or actions which have enhanced the perceived value of chemistry in society.

== International Society for Biological Calorimetry (ISBC) ==
The ISBC's Lavoisier Medal is awarded to an internationally acknowledged scientist for an outstanding contribution to the development and/or the application of direct calorimetry in biology and medicine

Source: ISBC

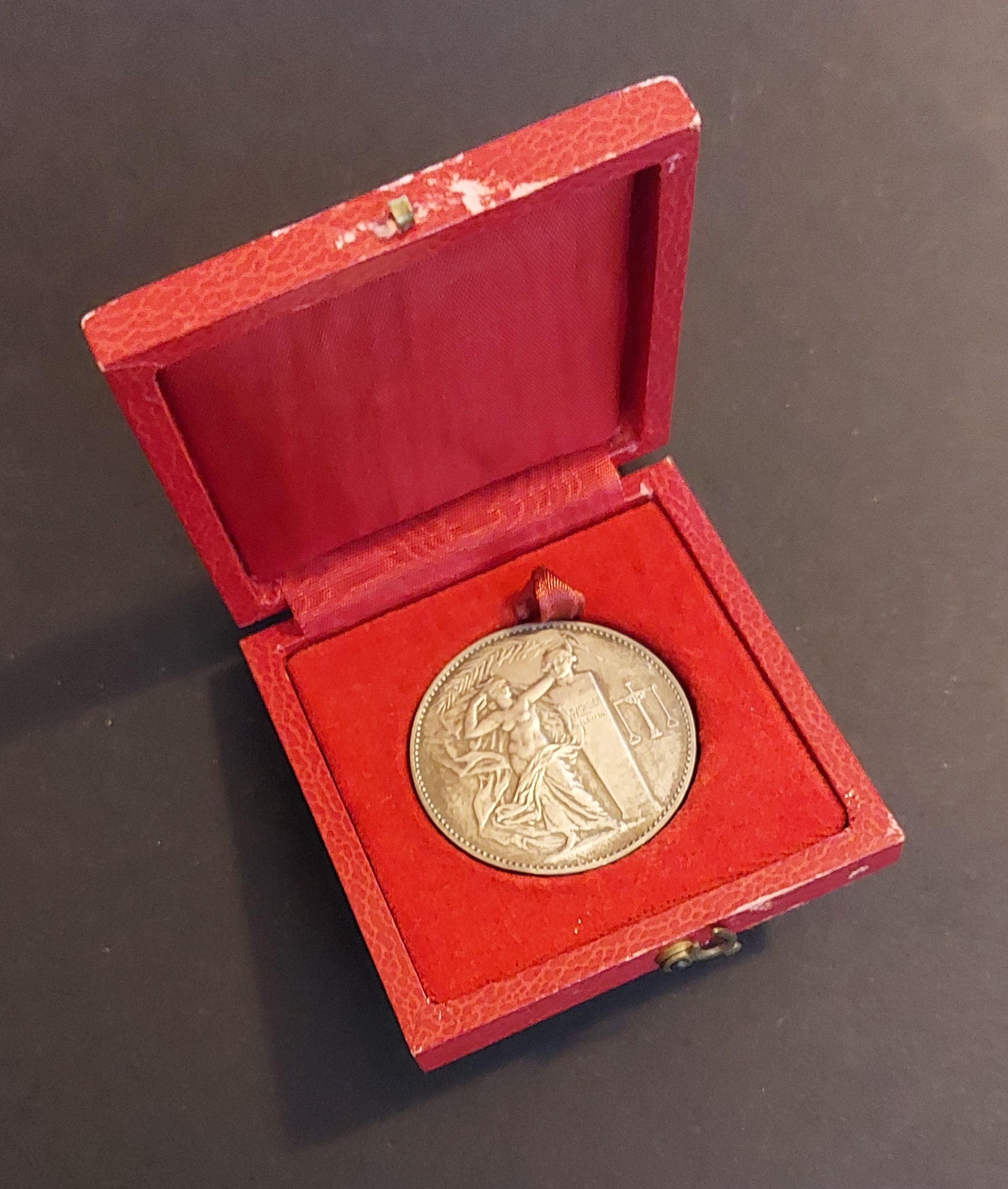
1965 Lavoisier Medal Winner - Claudette Kinnas

- 1990: Ingemar Wadsö, Lund, Sweden
- 1992: Richard B. Kemp, Aberystwyth, UK
- 1994: Lee Hansen, Provo, USA
- 1997: Ingolf Lamprecht, Berlin, Germany
- 1999: Anthony E. Beezer, London, UK
- 2001: Lena Gustafsson, Göteborg, Sweden
- 2003: Erich Gnaiger, Innsbruck, Austria
- 2006: Mario Monti, Lund, Sweden
- 2010: Edwin Battley, Stony Brook NY, USA
- 2014: Urs von Stockar, Lausanne, Switzerland

== DuPont ==
The DuPont company's Lavoisier Medal for Technical Achievement is presented to DuPont scientists and engineers who have made outstanding contributions to DuPont and their scientific fields throughout their careers. Antoine Lavoisier mentored the founder of the company, E. I. du Pont, more than 200 years ago.

It was awarded 95 times from 1990 to 2013. Stephanie Louise Kwolek received the award in 1995. She was the first female DuPont employee to receive the honor.

=== Partial list of recipients ===
Source (1990-2012): Dupont (archived copy)
Source: (2011 onwards): Dupont (archived copy)

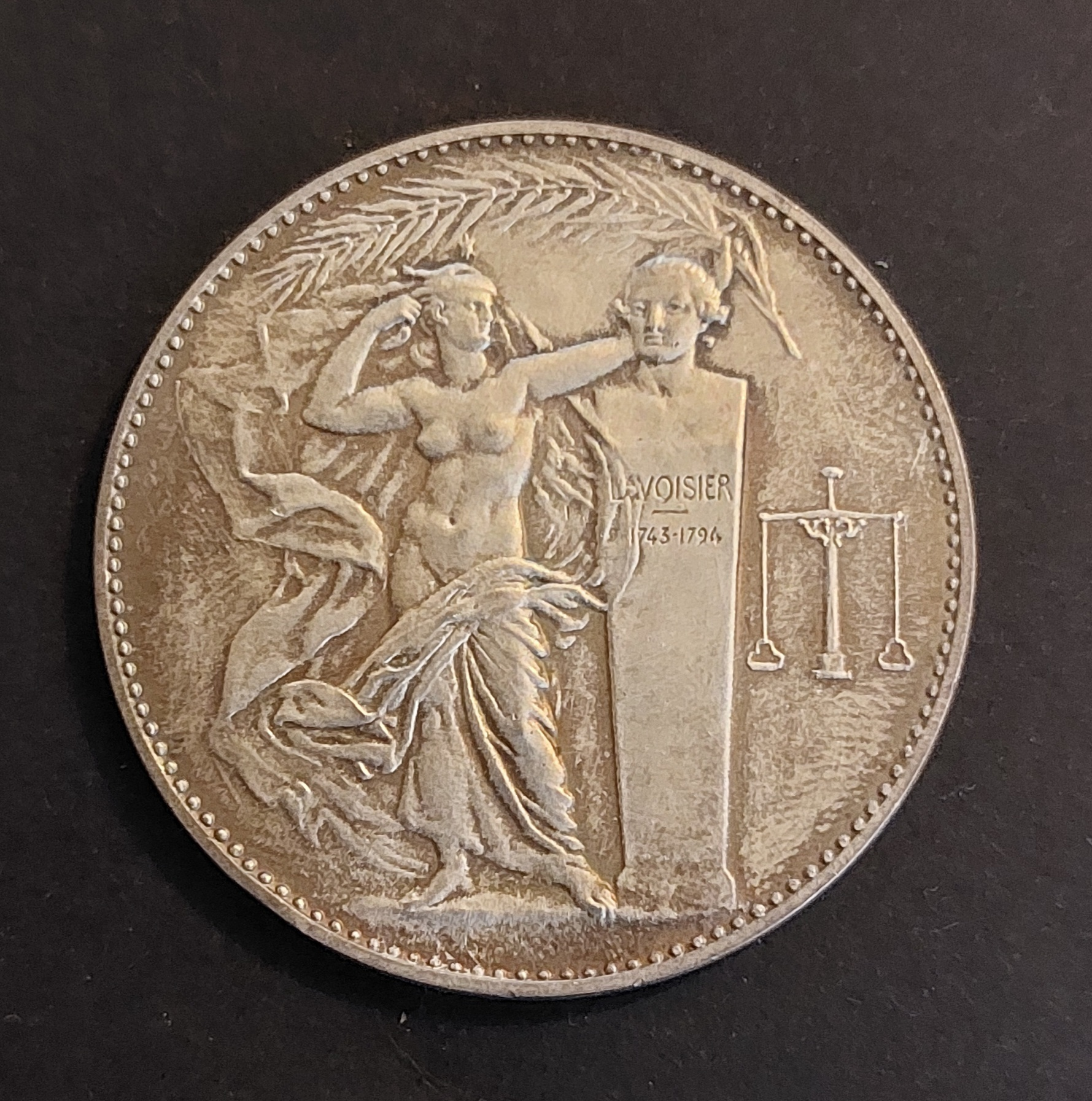
1965 Lavoisier Medal Winner - Claudette Kinnas

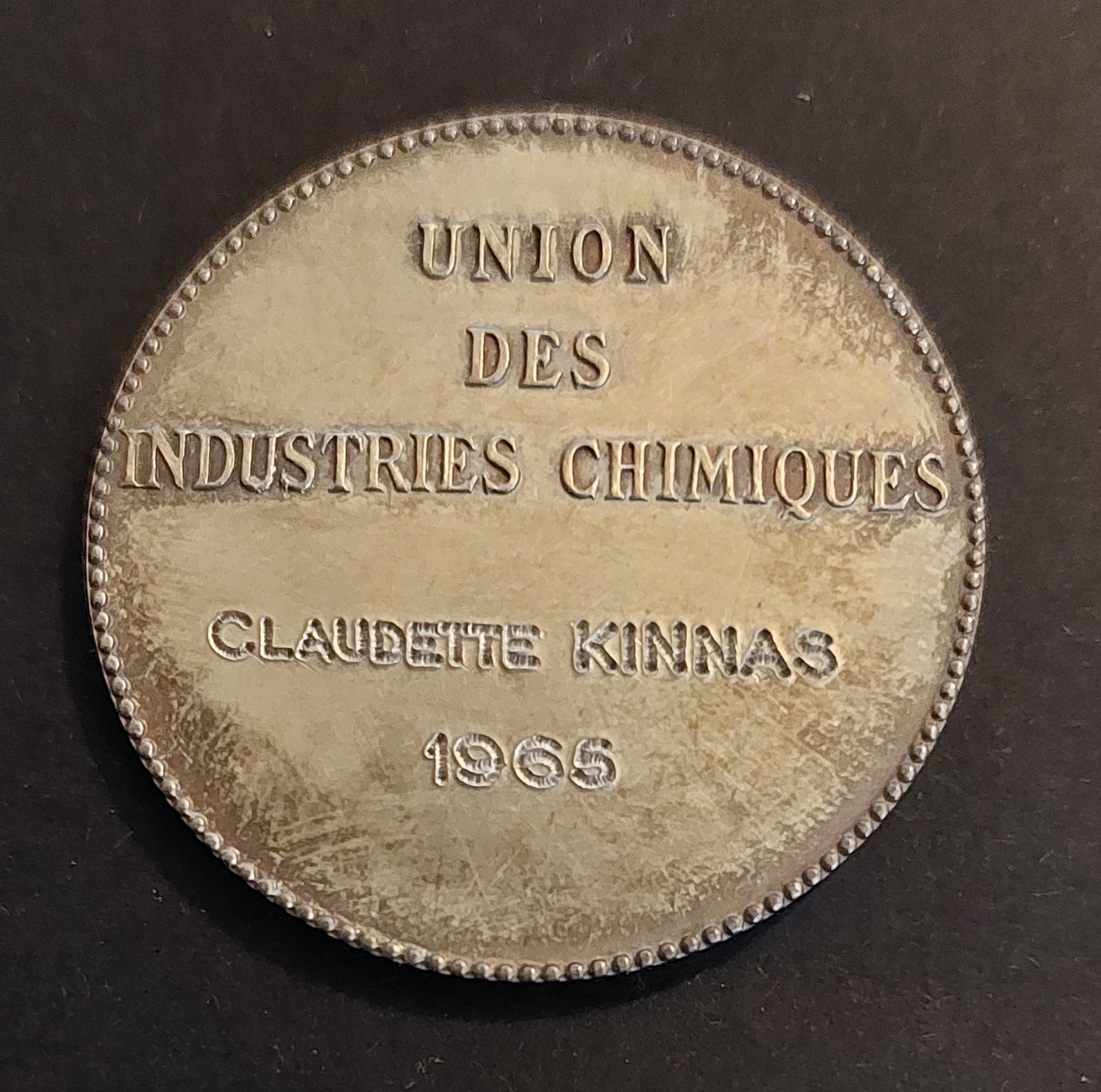
1965 Lavoisier Medal Winner - Claudette Kinnas

- 1947: Mrs. Georgette Lecam
- 1965: Claudette Kinnas
- 1990: Dr. Charles W. Todd
- 1990: Thomas H. Chilton (posthumously awarded).
- 1990: Nathaniel Wyeth
- 1991: Crawford Greenewalt
- 1992: Herman E. Schroeder
- 1993: Donald R. Johnson Pioneer of automatic clinical diagnostic instrumentation-Dupont Lavoisier Medal
- 1994: Howard Ensign Simmons Jr.
- 1995: Stephanie Kwolek
- 1995: Herbert S. Eleuterio
- 1996: Owen Wright Webster
- 1997: William C. Drinkard
- 1997: Charles Stine
- 1999: Albert Moore, Reg Davies
- 2000: Ivan Maxwell Robinson
- 2002: Wilfred Sweeny
- 2003: Rudolph Pariser
- 2005: Vlodek Gabara, Harry Kamack, Mel Kohan
- 2007: Edward J. Deyrup, Charles Joseph Noelke
- 2008: D. Peter Carlson, Noel C. Scrivner
- 2009: Calvin Chi-Ching Chien, George P. Lahm
- 2010: Robert L. Segebart
- 2011: Marc C. Albertsen
- 2012: Scott V. Tingey
- 2013: Mario Nappa
- 2014: Steve Taylor, Dave Estell
- 2015: Stephen Smith, Ronald McKinney
- 2016: Mick Ward, Tom Carney
- 2017: Joe Lachowski, George Weber
- 2018: Andrew Morgan, Scott Power, Peter Trefonas
- 2019: Mark Lamontia
- 2020: Andrew Morgan
- 2021: Mark Barger, Peter Berg
- 2022: Theresa Weston, Todd Buley
- 2023: Deyan Wang
- 2024: Bradley K. Taylor
- 2025: Steve Kons, Sourav Sengupta

== See also ==
- List of chemistry awards
- List of engineering awards
