= Nylon rope trick =

Scientific experiment

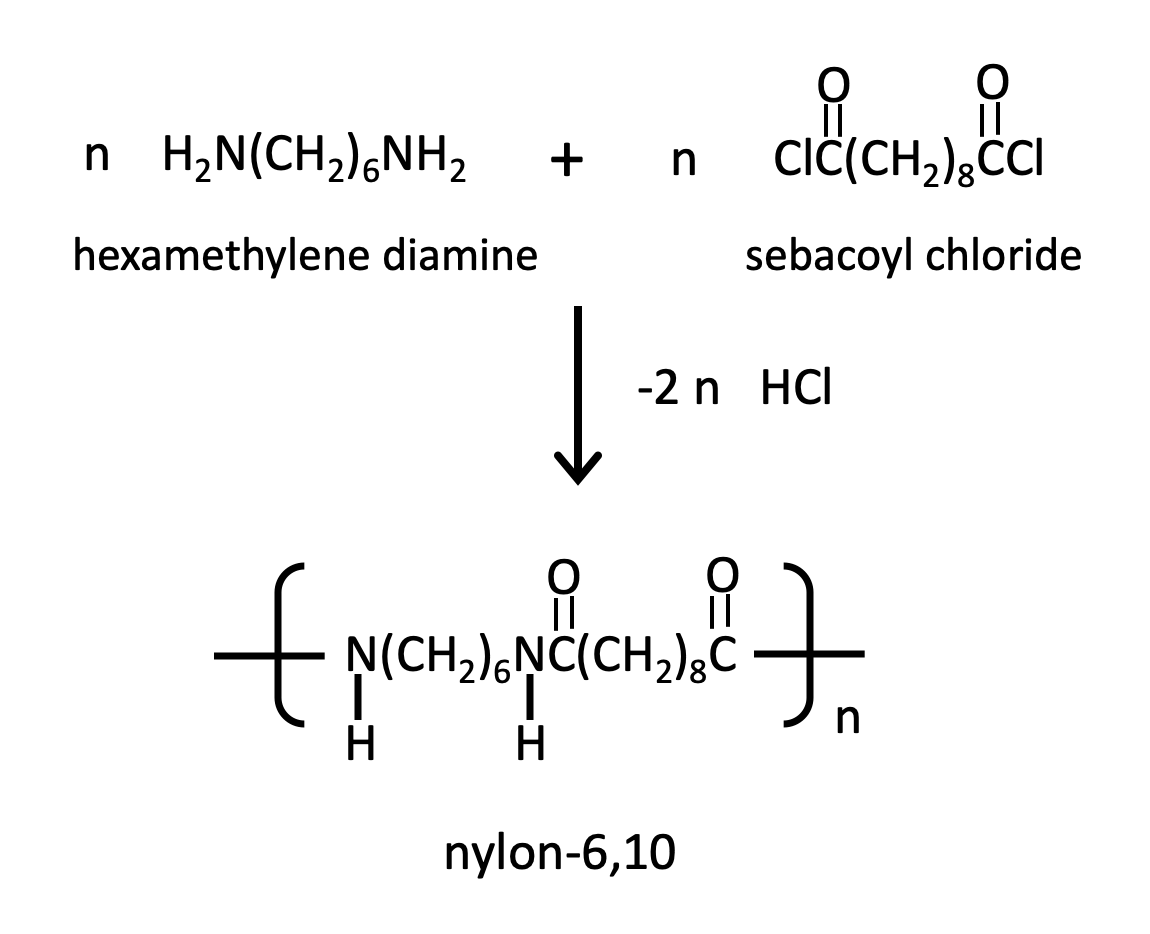
Acid chloride preparative route for nylon-6,10, which is often used in the nylon rope trick

The nylon rope trick is a scientific demonstration that illustrates some of the fundamental chemical principles of step-growth polymerization and provides students and other observers with a hands-on demonstration of the preparation of a synthetic polymer.

The nylon rope trick typically makes use of a water solution of an aliphatic diamine with a solution of an aliphatic diacid chloride in a solvent that does not dissolve in water, yielding a synthetic polyamide of the nylon-type. Nylon 610 is commonly used, in which hexamethylene diamine is dissolved in water to a concentration of about 0.40 moles / deciliter. A solution of sebacoyl chloride in cyclohexane (0.15 moles / deciliter concentration) is then layered on top of the water solution, the reaction typically being conducted in a beaker. The solution is not agitated; instead the nylon 610 polymer forms as a flexible film at the interface of the water and cyclohexane layers, in an example of an interfacial polymerization. The experimentalist grasps the polymer film, withdrawing it from the reaction vessel, forming a filament or rope, and collecting it on a rotating rod above the reaction vessel. New polymer forms at the interface as fresh surfaces of the cyclohexane layer and the water layer form. In this way, the demonstration yields a continuous rope that is collected on the rotating rod. Nylon 66 can also be produced at laboratory scale in this way.

Representative procedures and equipment lists for conducting the nylon rope trick demonstration are available in literature procedures.

The nylon rope trick was developed as a scientific demonstration by American chemist Stephanie Kwolek, who later invented Kevlar aramid.

== Gallery ==
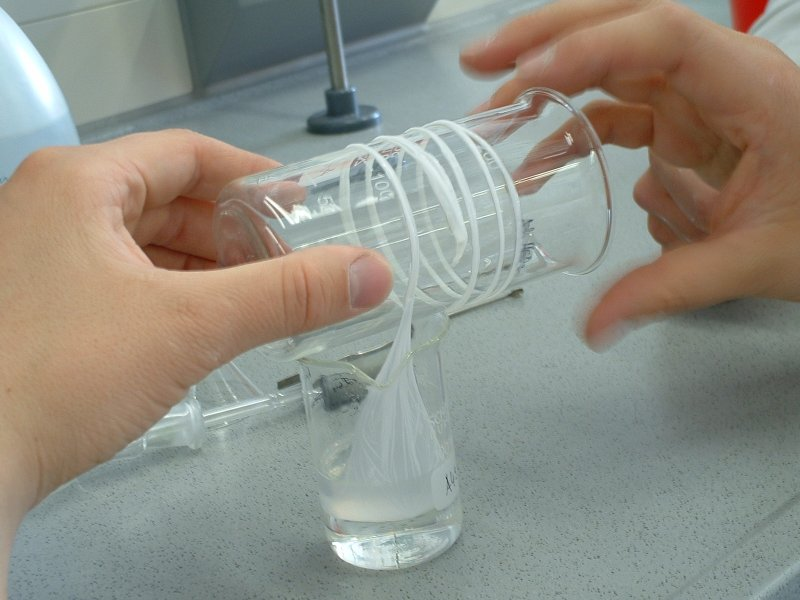
Nylon-66

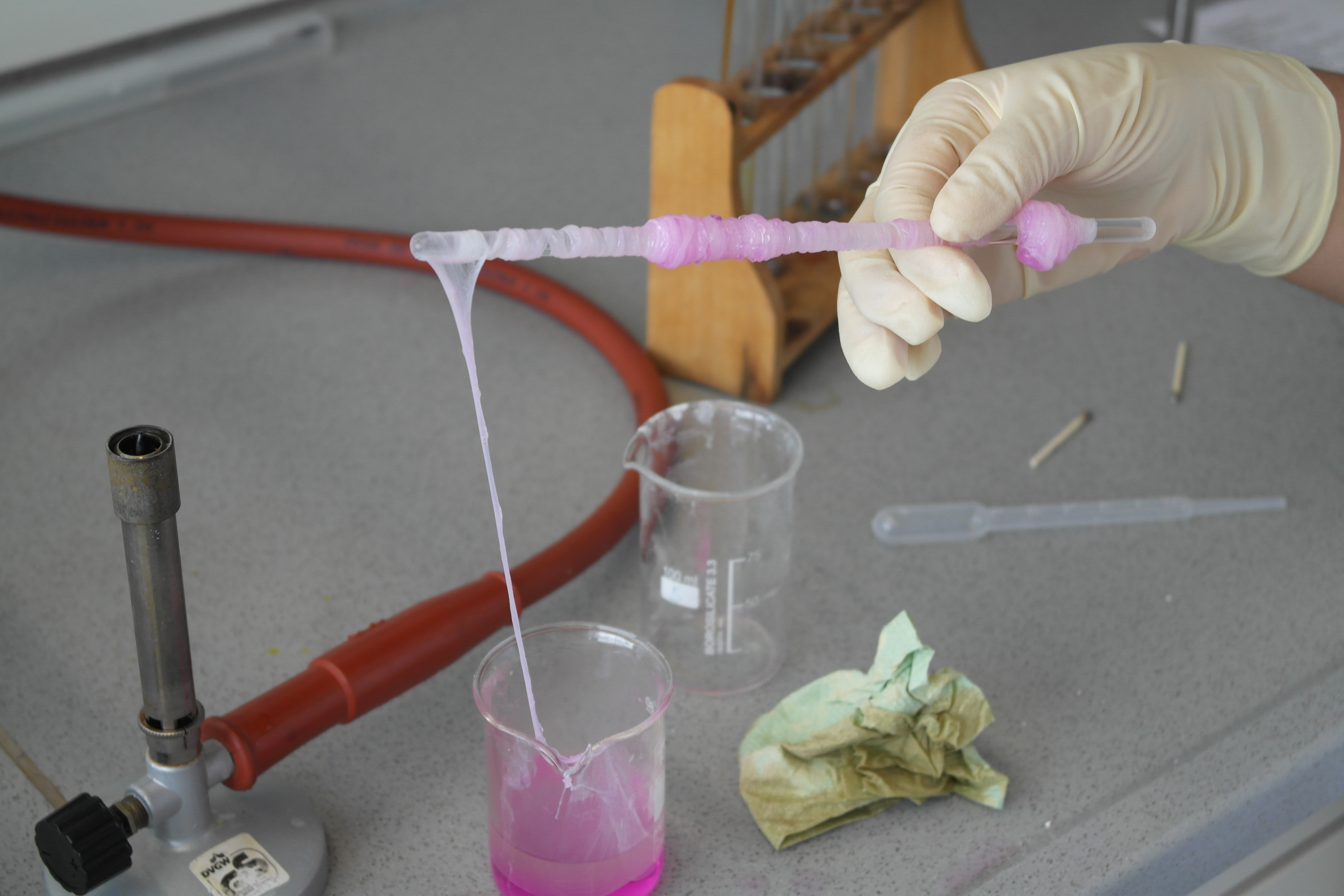
The nylon is pink because the solution has an indicator dye in it.

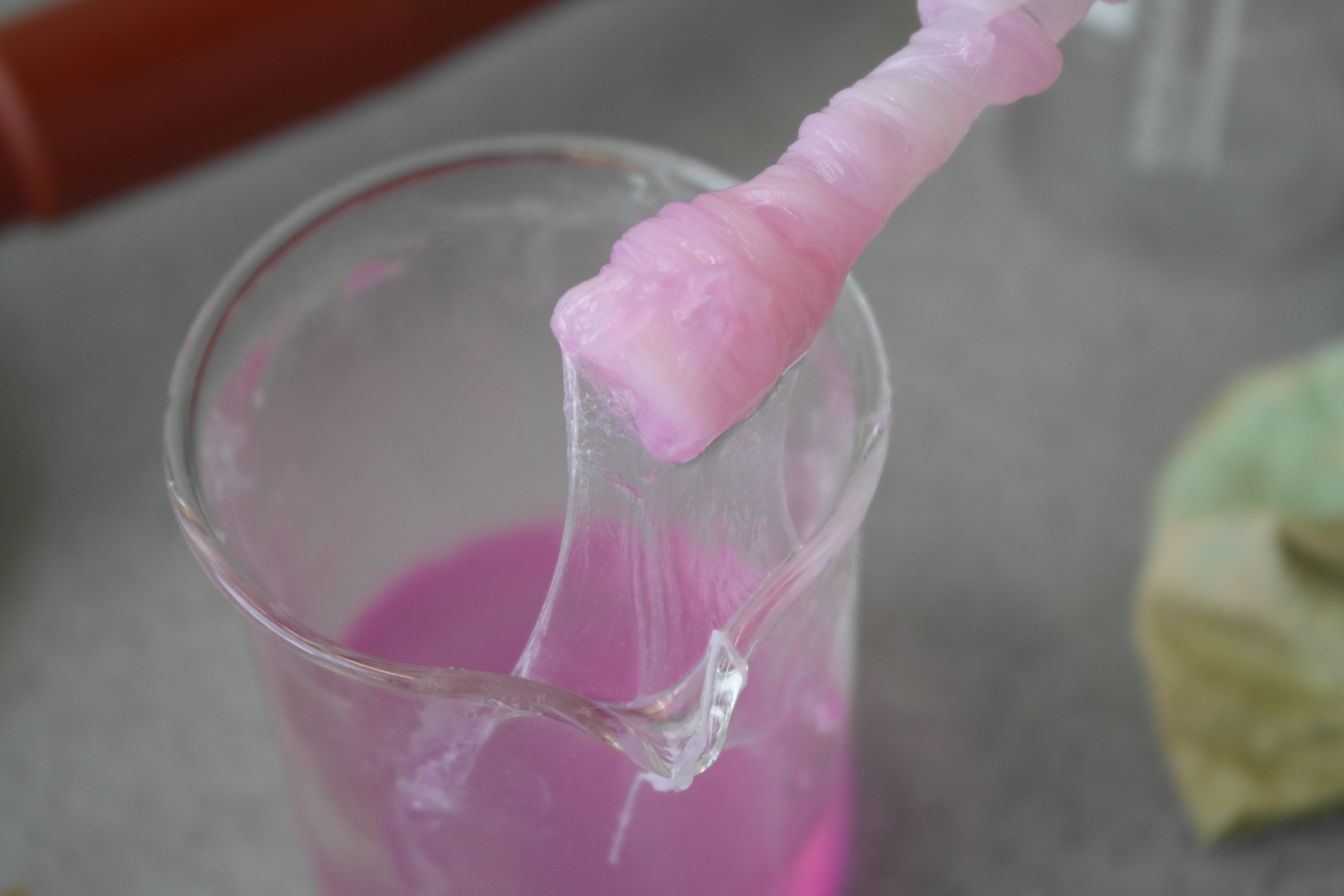

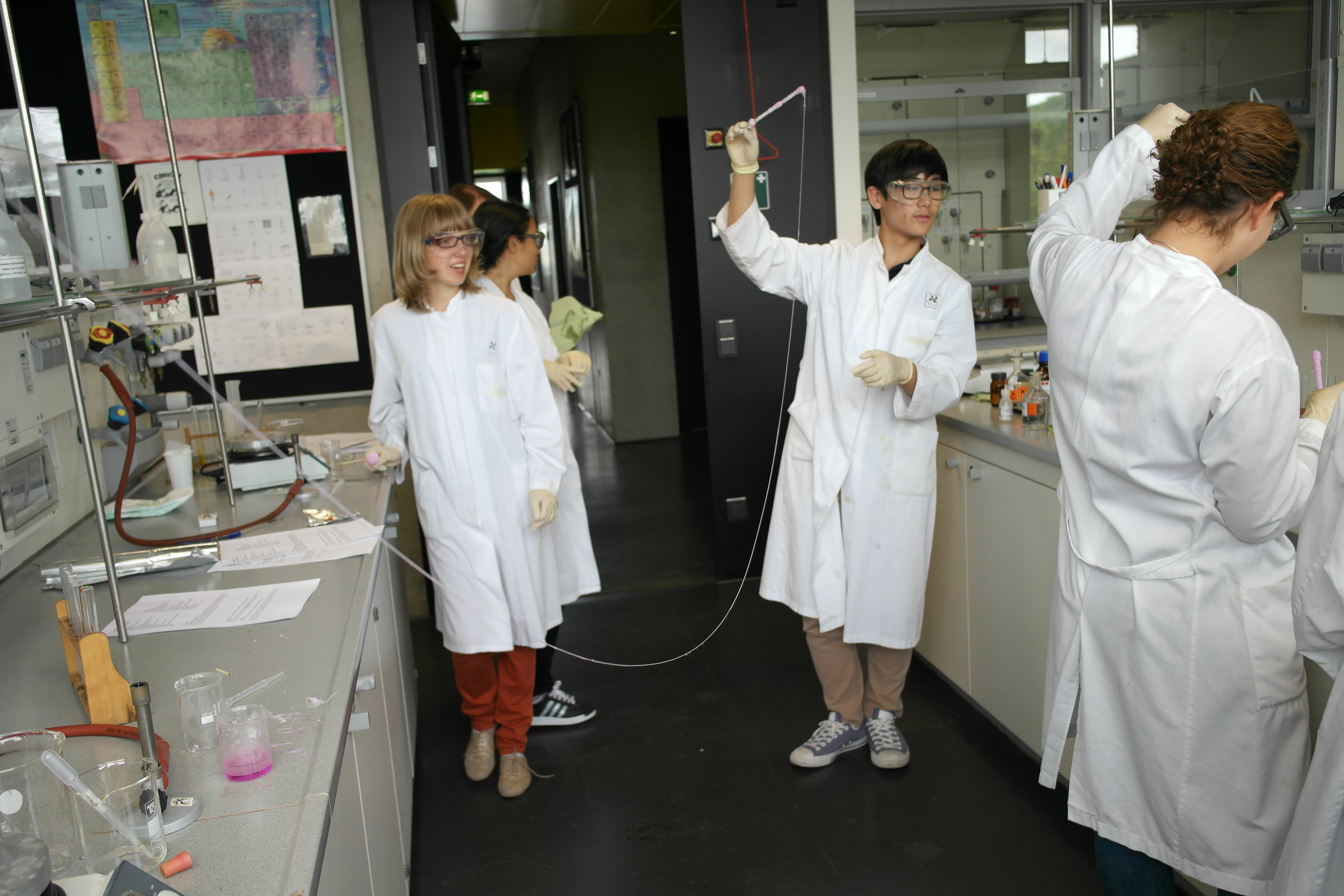
A nylon strand, synthesised by children at XLAB international science camp 2012 August
