= Carl F. Prutton =

American chemist, chemical engineer, and executive

Carl Frederick Prutton (July 30, 1898 – July 15, 1970) was an American chemist, inventor, industrial executive, philanthropist and educator. Prutton held more than a hundred patents on lubricants and chemical processes known in the chemical industry as "the Prutton patents". Prutton was the head of the department of chemistry and chemical engineering at the Case Institute of Technology, a director of research and a vice president at Olin Mathieson Chemical Corporation, an executive vice president of the Food Machinery and Chemical Corporation, and a member of the National Academy of Engineering.

He received several notable awards and distinctions, including the Perkin Medal of the Society of Chemical Industry, the Modern Pioneer Award of the National Association of Manufacturers, and an honorary Doctor of Science degree from Manhattan College.

== Chronology ==
- 1898: born in Cleveland, Ohio on July 30
- 1920: B.S., Chemical Engineering, Case Institute of Technology
- 1923: M.S., Case Institute of Technology
- 1928: Ph.D., physical chemistry, Western Reserve University
- 1929: associate professor in 1929, Case Institute of Technology
- 1936-1948: full professor and chairman of the Department of Chemistry and Chemical Engineering, Case Institute of Technology
- 1948: director of research, Olin Mathieson Chemical Corporation, Baltimore
- 1949: vice-president, Olin Mathieson Chemical Corporation
- 1952: president of a division, Olin Mathieson Chemical Corporation
- 1954: vice president and director of the chemical division, the Food Machinery and Chemical Corporation
- 1956: executive vice president, the Food Machinery and Chemical Corporation
