= Robert Cairns (footballer) =

English footballer (1927–1958)

Personal information
- Full name: Robert Lynn Cairns
- Date of birth: 25 December 1927
- Place of birth: Choppington, England
- Date of death: 4 January 1958 (aged 30)
- Place of death: Bedlington, England
- Position: Full-back

Senior career*
Years	Team	Apps	(Gls)
–1948	Sunderland	0	(0)
1948–1957	Gateshead	139	(0)
- * Club domestic league appearances and goals

Robert Lynn "Bobby" Cairns (25 December 1927 – 4 January 1958) was an English footballer who played as a full-back.

Cairns began his football career as an amateur with Sunderland before joining Gateshead in 1948. He made 139 appearances in the Football League Third Division North and 10 appearances in the FA Cup before leaving the club in 1957.

Cairns died in an industrial accident in 1958. He was working as a joiner at the West Sleekburn Colliery when a cage fell from a hoist on him, killing him.

== Sources ==
- Robert Cairns at Post War English & Scottish Football League A–Z Player's Transfer Database
- "Robert Cairns". Barry Hugman's Footballers. Archived from the original on 8 June 2024.
- Robert Cairns at the English National Football Archive (subscription required)
