= Robert W. Cairns =

American chemist

- Hercules corporate portrait, circa 1950.
- Born: December 23, 1909; Oberlin, Ohio, United States
- Died: January 27, 1985 (aged 75); Wilmington, Delaware, United States
- Education: Oberlin College; Johns Hopkins University
- Known for: Solventless Rocket Propellants
- Awards: Perkin Medal (1969); IRI Medal (1974)
- Scientific career
- Fields: Chemistry
- Workplaces: Hercules

Robert W. Cairns (1909-1985) was an American chemist who worked at Hercules and at the U.S. Department of Commerce. He contributed to World War II technological advances in explosives.

== Biography ==
Cairns was born in Oberlin, Ohio. He was the son of William Cairns, an Oberlin College mathematics professor. He received an AB from Oberlin College in 1930 and a PhD from Johns Hopkins University in 1932. He attended the six-week advanced management program at Harvard Business School.

He was appointed director of research in 1955 at Hercules Research Center, was elected to the board of directors in 1960 and in 1967, he became vice-president. In 1968, he was appointed president of the American Chemical Society and then in 1972 named executive director. After retiring from Hercules in 1971, he became deputy assistant secretary for science and technology at the U.S. Department of Commerce.

Cairns led innovation in propellants for military rockets and in the photographic recording of explosive reactions. He then directed the role of Hercules as the major supplier to the U.S. military of these propellants.

He died of pneumonia in 1985 at the age of 75.

== Awards and honors ==
- Perkin Medal (1969)
- Industrial Research Institute Medal (1974)
- Chairman of American Section of the Society of Chemical Industry (1961-1962)
- President of International Union of Pure and Applied Chemistry (1975-1977)
- President of University of Delaware Research Foundation
- President of Industrial Research Institute
