= Chemistry of photolithography =

Overview article

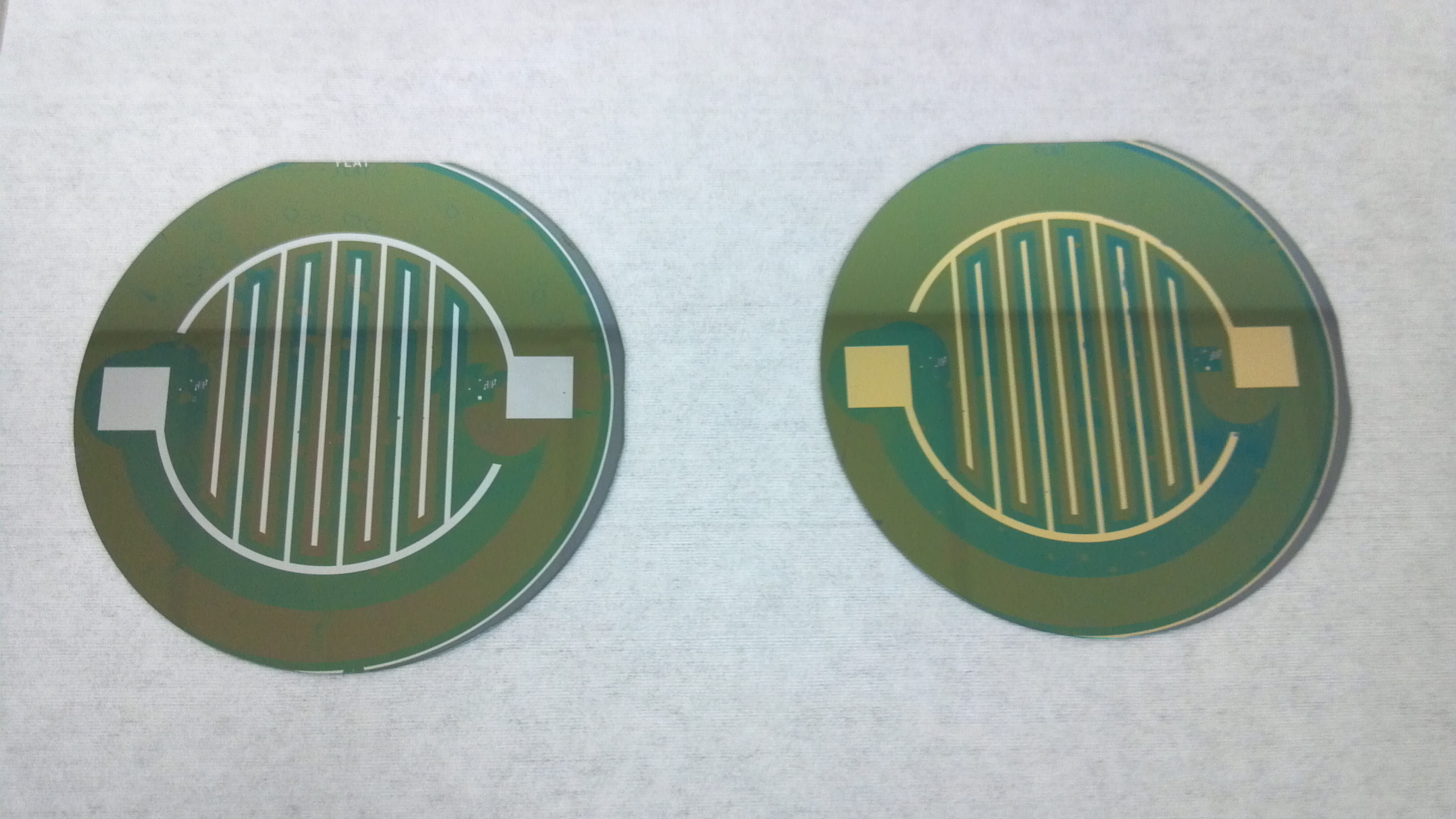
A gold and aluminum sputtered solar cell manufactured from a <100> p-type silicon wafer at the Cal Poly San Luis Obispo Microfab clean room.

Photolithography is a process in removing select portions of thin films used in microfabrication. Microfabrication is the production of parts on the micro- and nano- scale, typically on the surface of silicon wafers, for the production of integrated circuits, microelectromechanical systems (MEMS), solar cells, and other devices. Photolithography makes this process possible through the combined use of hexamethyldisilazane (HMDS), photoresist (positive or negative), spin coating, photomask, an exposure system and other various chemicals. By carefully manipulating these factors it is possible to create nearly any geometry microstructure on the surface of a silicon wafer. The chemical interaction between all the different components and the surface of the silicon wafer makes photolithography an interesting chemistry problem. Current engineering has been able to create features on the surface of silicon wafers between 1 and 100 μm.

== Silicon wafer ==
Silicon wafers are cut from a solid ingot of nearly-pure (99.9999999%) silicon. This is done through the process of Czochralski growth, which is diagramed in the adjacent image, and produces a single intact diamond cubic silicon crystal. Due to its structure, monocrystalline silicon is anisotropic, which gives it different structural and electrical properties in different plane directions. Using miller indexes to denote the different plane orientations, the (1,0,0) and the (1,1,1) faces are typically used in silicon wafers (see image). The silicon ingot is oriented and cut along one these planes to expose that surface for processing through photolithography. The reason to use either of these planar faces depends on the application for which the silicon wafer will be used, or how it will be processed. At any rate, this depends on the use of etchants, photoresist, and acids to treat the surface, and the chemical interactions of these chemicals with the crystal surface depends on the surface properties of that crystalline face. A table on the right depicts the surface energies, atomic densities, and interatomic spacing of the three planes for a silicon crystal.

Silicon ingot formation using the Czochralski process

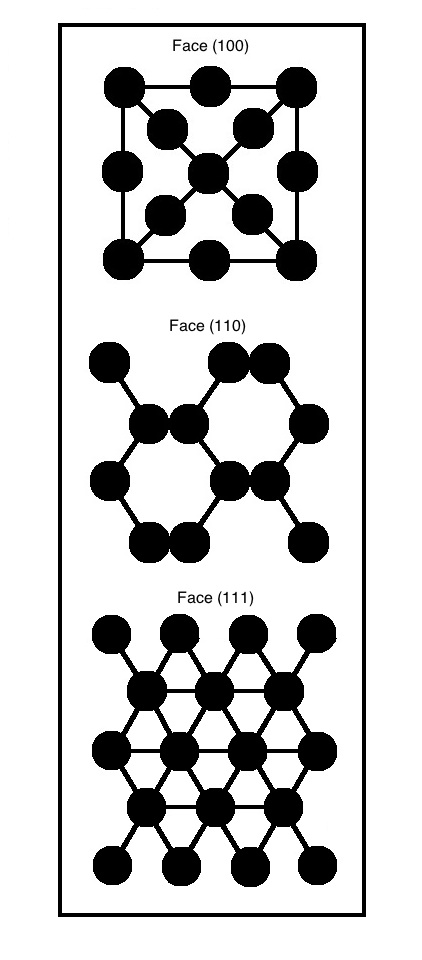
Crystalline faces of silicon crystal

Surface energy, atomic density, and spacing of silicon for each planar direction
	Miller Index (plane surface)		
	(1,0,0)	(1,1,0)	(1,1,1)
Atomic density (10^{14}/cm^{2})	6.78	9.59	15.66
Spacing (Å)	5.43	3.84	3.13
Surface Energy (ergs/cm^{2})	2130	1510	1230

== Photoresist ==
In photolithography, photoresist compounds are used create a mask on the surface of a silicon wafer. The mask allows for precise control over the doping and etching processes used to form devices on silicon wafers. It is important for the mask to hold up to chemical attack during the etching process. Photoresists have three major components, a solvent, resin, and sensitizer (or photoactive compound). The compound is applied to the silicon wafer in liquid form and polymerization is controlled through exposure to light. Because Photoresists are non polar compounds, and silicon dioxide has a polar character, adhesion problems can manifest between the two materials. When photoresist does not adhere properly, features lose resolution. Photoresist Adhesion becomes very important as feature sizes get smaller. In order to reliably create small features, the surface of the silicon wafer must be made hydrophobic to promote photoresist adhesion.

The adhesion characteristics can be observed and tested with a goniometer test. The surface energy characteristics of the silicon wafer can be measured by placing a drop of deionized water or ethylene glycol and measuring the contact angle of the droplet. Using the Young's relation and tabulated values for interfacial energy, we can estimate the surface energy of the solid.

•Young's Relation: $\gamma_\mathrm{SG} = \gamma_\mathrm{SL} - \gamma_\mathrm{LG} \cos \theta_\,$

      
  
    
      
        
          γ
          
            
              S
              G
            
          
        
      
    
    {\displaystyle \gamma _{\mathrm {SG} }}
  
 - Interfacial energy between solid and vapor 
  
    
      
        
          (
          J
          
            /
          
          
            m
            
              2
            
          
          )
        
      
    
    {\displaystyle {(J/m^{2})}}
  

      
  
    
      
        
          γ
          
            
              S
              L
            
          
        
      
    
    {\displaystyle \gamma _{\mathrm {SL} }}
  
 - Interfacial energy between solid and liquid 
  
    
      
        
          (
          J
          
            /
          
          
            m
            
              2
            
          
          )
        
      
    
    {\displaystyle {(J/m^{2})}}
  

      
  
    
      
        
          γ
          
            
              L
              G
            
          
        
      
    
    {\displaystyle \gamma _{\mathrm {LG} }}
  
 - Interfacial energy between liquid and vapor 
  
    
      
        
          (
          J
          
            /
          
          
            m
            
              2
            
          
          )
        
      
    
    {\displaystyle {(J/m^{2})}}
  

      θ   - Contact Angle

Schematic of a drop of liquid on a solid surface, allowing for further explanation of the Young's Relation equation.

=== Positive resist ===
Positive photoresists are composed of a novolac resin, ethyl lactate solvent, and Diazonaphthaquinone (DQ) as the photoactive compound. Positive photoresist reacts with light to cause the polymer to break down and become soluble in a developer solution. Positive resist has better resistance to etchant than negative photoresist. Positive resists are better for producing small feature size, but does not adhere to silicon wafers as well as negative resist. When making small features it is critical to have good adhesion.

=== Negative resist ===
Negative photoresists are composed of a poly(cis-isoprene) matrix, xylene solvent, and bis-arylazide as the photoactive compound. Negative photoresists react to light by polymerizing. The unexposed portions can be removed by using a developer solution. negative resist has better adhesion and is great for features greater than 2 μm in size.

== HMDS ==
Treating a silicon wafer with HMDS, to make the silicon wafer hydrophobic.

A common method to increase adhesion of photoresist on the silicon wafer surface is to treat the wafer with Hexamethyldisilazane (HMDS). A new silicon wafer has a polar surface and has some adsorbed water on the surface. The wafer can undergo a dehydration bake to remove adsorbed water, and followed by the HMDS treatment also known as the priming stage. HMDS can be dispensed in liquid form onto the wafer using a syringe while the wafer is attached to a vacuum chuck in a spin coater. HMDS can also be applied in gas form in the process known as the vapor prime. The HMDS promotes good photoresist-to-wafer adhesion because it ensures the wafer surface is hydrophobic. After HMDS treatment the silicon surface oxide becomes silated, leaving a non-polar surface. The pristine silicon (100) face has a surface energy value of 56.9 mN/m, which is reduced to a value of 44.1 mN/m after HMDS treatment The molecular formula for hexamethyldisilazane is C_{6}H_{19}NSi_{2}.

The chemical composition of hexamethylsilazane

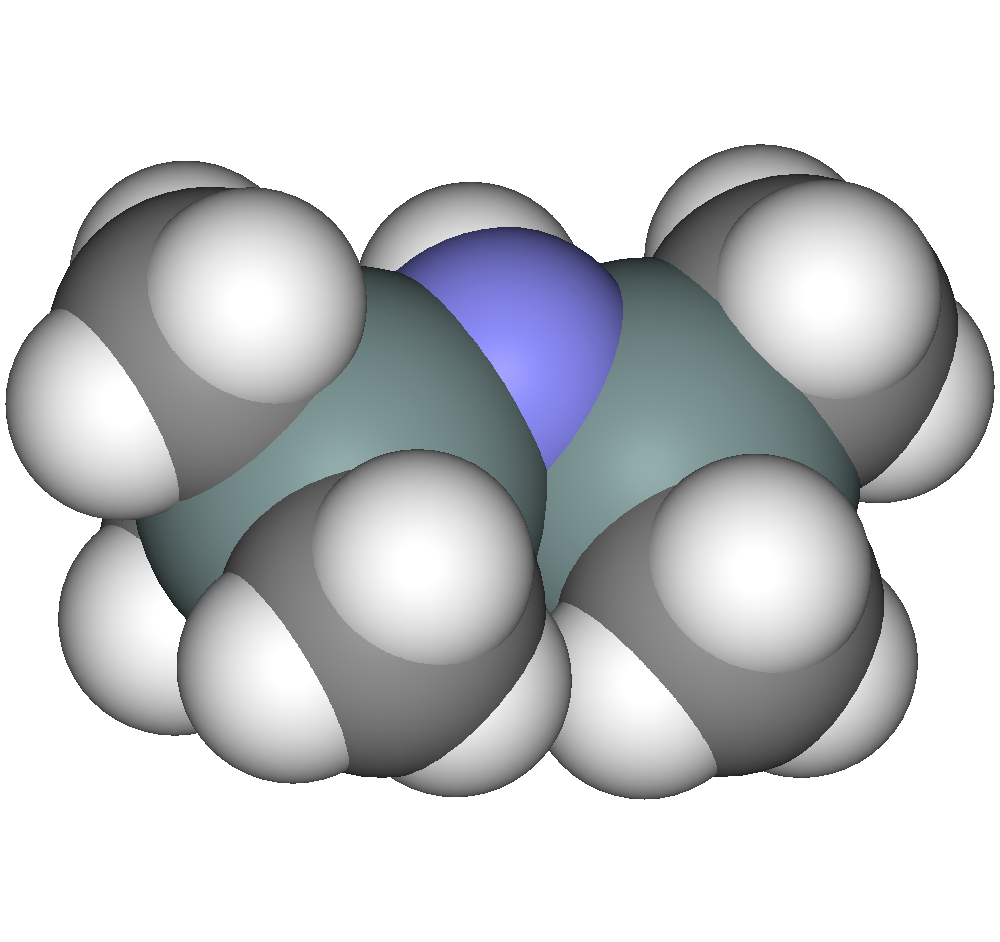
3D image of HMDS

== Spin coating ==
There are four basic parameters that are involved in spin coating: solution viscosity, solid content (density), angular speed, and spin time. A range of thicknesses can be achieved by spin coating. Most commonly the thicknesses range from 1-200 μm. The main properties that affect the thickness of the film are viscosity and spin speed. The more viscous the solvent the thicker the film will be and the faster the wafer is spun the thinner the film will be. By manipulating these two factors the different range of thicknesses is possible.

• thickness: $d = ({{4 \rho \omega^2 \over\ 3 \mu}t})^{-1/2}$

      ρ - density 
  
    
      
        
          (
          k
          g
          
            /
          
          
            m
            
              3
            
          
          )
        
      
    
    {\displaystyle {(kg/m^{3})}}
  

      μ - viscosity 
  
    
      
        
          (
          P
          a
          ⋅
          s
          )
        
      
    
    {\displaystyle {(Pa\cdot s)}}
  

      ω - angular velocity 
  
    
      
        
          (
          r
          a
          d
          
            /
          
          s
          )
        
      
    
    {\displaystyle {(rad/s)}}
  

      t - time 
  
    
      
        
          (
          s
          )
        
      
    
    {\displaystyle {(s)}}
  

The density and viscosity both relate to the actual properties of the photoresist. This parameter can be manipulated by diluting the photoresist and adding different components to it to change its properties. The angular velocity and time relate to the spin coater and how fast it is spinning and for how long.

A common issue in spin coating is a "beading" up of solvent at the edge of the silicon wafer. A process known as backside washing is most commonly used to spin this bead off of the wafer. By programming multiple different spin speeds into the spin coating apparatus the thickness of the solvent can be made uniform without the "beading" up at the edges.

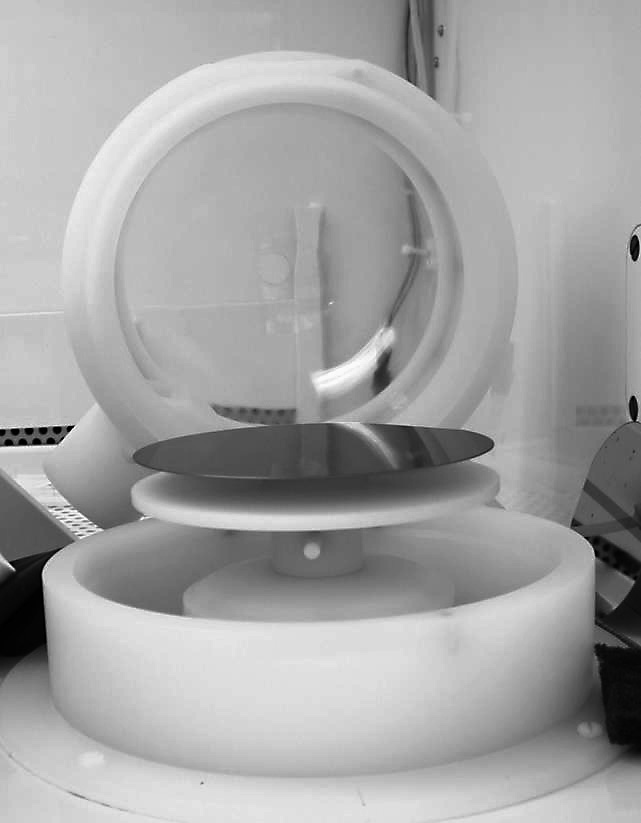
A typical spin coating apparatus for applying HMDS and photoresist onto a silicon wafer

Spin coating has its limitations, though. Currently engineers and scientist are working on figuring out a better way to apply photoresist to the substrate of a silicon wafer. Spin coating can result in issues with wafer topography such as non-round substrates, oversized substrates, fragile substrates and material consumption. One potential solution to this issue is spraying the photoresist onto the surface. By spraying the photoresist onto the surface of the wafer as opposed to spin coating the photoresist, a lot of photoresist is saved, and smaller and more precise parts can be made. Spray coating is still in its development phase and much more research needs to be done to make it cost effective and applicable.

== See also ==
- photolithography
- microfabrication
- lithography
- photomask
- HMDS
- photoresist
- spin coating
