= Neptunium oxide =

Neptunium oxide may refer to:

- Neptunium(IV) oxide (neptunium dioxide), NpO_{2}
- Neptunium(V) oxide (neptunium pentoxide), Np_{2}O_{5}
