= Benzyl group =

Chemical group (–CH2–C6H5)

Benzyl group and derivatives: Benzyl group, benzyl radical, benzyl amine, benzyl bromide, benzyl chloroformate, and benzyl methyl ether. R = heteroatom, alkyl, aryl, allyl etc. or other substituents.

In organic chemistry, benzyl is the substituent or molecular fragment possessing the structure R−CH_{2}−C_{6}H_{5}. Benzyl features a benzene ring (C_{6}H_{6}) attached to a methylene group (−CH_{2}−).

== Nomenclature ==
In IUPAC nomenclature, the prefix benzyl refers to a C_{6}H_{5}CH_{2} substituent, for example benzyl chloride or benzyl benzoate. Benzyl is not to be confused with phenyl with the formula C_{6}H_{5}. The term benzylic is used to describe the position of the first carbon bonded to a benzene or other aromatic ring. For example, (C_{6}H_{5})(CH_{3})_{2}C^{+} is referred to as a "benzylic" carbocation. The benzyl free radical has the formula C_{6}H_{5}CH_{2}•. The benzyl cation or phenylcarbenium ion is the carbocation with formula C_{6}H_{5}CH^{+}_{2}; the benzyl anion or phenylmethanide ion is the carbanion with the formula C_{6}H_{5}CH^{−}_{2}. None of these species can be formed in significant amounts in the solution phase under normal conditions, but they are useful referents for discussion of reaction mechanisms and may exist as reactive intermediates.

=== Abbreviations ===
Benzyl is most commonly abbreviated Bn. For example, benzyl alcohol can be represented as BnOH. Less common abbreviations are Bzl and Bz, the latter of which is ambiguous as it is also the standard abbreviation for the benzoyl group C_{6}H_{5}C(O)−. Likewise, benzyl should not be confused with the phenyl group C_{6}H_{5}−, abbreviated Ph.

== Reactivity of benzylic centers ==
The enhanced reactivity of benzylic positions is attributed to the low bond dissociation energy for benzylic C−H bonds. Specifically, the bond C_{6}H_{5}CH_{2}−H is about 10–15% weaker than other kinds of C−H bonds. The neighboring aromatic ring stabilizes benzyl radicals. The data tabulated below compare benzylic C−H bond to related C−H bond strengths.

Bond	Bond	Bond-dissociation energy		Comment
Bond	Bond	(kcal/mol)	(kJ/mol)	Comment
C_{6}H_{5}CH_{2}−H	benzylic C−H bond	90	377	akin to allylic C−H bonds such bonds show enhanced reactivity
H_{3}C−H	methyl C−H bond	105	439	one of the strongest aliphatic C−H bonds
C_{2}H_{5}−H	ethyl C−H bond	101	423	slightly weaker than H_{3}C−H
C_{6}H_{5}−H	phenyl C−H bond	113	473	comparable to vinyl radical, rare
CH_{2}=CHCH_{2}−H	allylic C–H bond	89	372	similar to benzylic C-H
(C_{6}H_{4})_{2}CH−H	fluorenyl C–H bond	80		more activated vs diphenylmethyle (pKa = 22.6)
(C_{6}H_{5})_{2}CH−H	diphenylmethyl C–H bond	82		"doubly benzylic" (pKa = 32.2)
(C_{6}H_{5})_{3}C−H	trityl C–H bond	81	339	"triply benzylic"

The weakness of the C−H bond reflects the stability of the benzylic radical. For related reasons, benzylic substituents exhibit enhanced reactivity, as in oxidation, free radical halogenation, or hydrogenolysis. As a practical example, in the presence of suitable catalysts, p-xylene oxidizes exclusively at the benzylic positions to give terephthalic acid:

$$\ce{CH3C6H4CH3 + 3 O2 -> HO2CC6H4CO2H + 2 H2O}$$

Millions of tonnes of terephthalic acid are produced annually by this method.

=== Functionalization at the benzylic position ===
In a few cases, these benzylic transformations occur under conditions suitable for lab synthesis. The Wohl-Ziegler reaction will brominate a benzylic C–H bond: (ArCHR_{2} → ArCBrR_{2}). Any non-tertiary benzylic alkyl group will be oxidized to a carboxyl group by aqueous potassium permanganate (KMnO_{4}) or concentrated nitric acid (HNO_{3}): (ArCHR_{2} → ArCOOH). Finally, the complex of chromium trioxide and 3,5-dimethylpyrazole (CrO_{3}−dmpyz) will selectively oxidize a benzylic methylene group to a carbonyl: (ArCH_{2}R → ArC(O)R). 2-iodoxybenzoic acid in DMSO performs similarly.

== As a protecting group ==
Benzyl groups are occasionally employed as protecting groups in organic synthesis. Their installation and especially their removal require relatively harsh conditions, so benzyl is not typically preferred for protection.

=== Alcohol protection ===
Benzyl is commonly used in organic synthesis as a robust protecting group for alcohols and carboxylic acids.

- Treatment of alcohol with a strong base such as powdered potassium hydroxide or sodium hydride and benzyl halide (BnCl or BnBr)
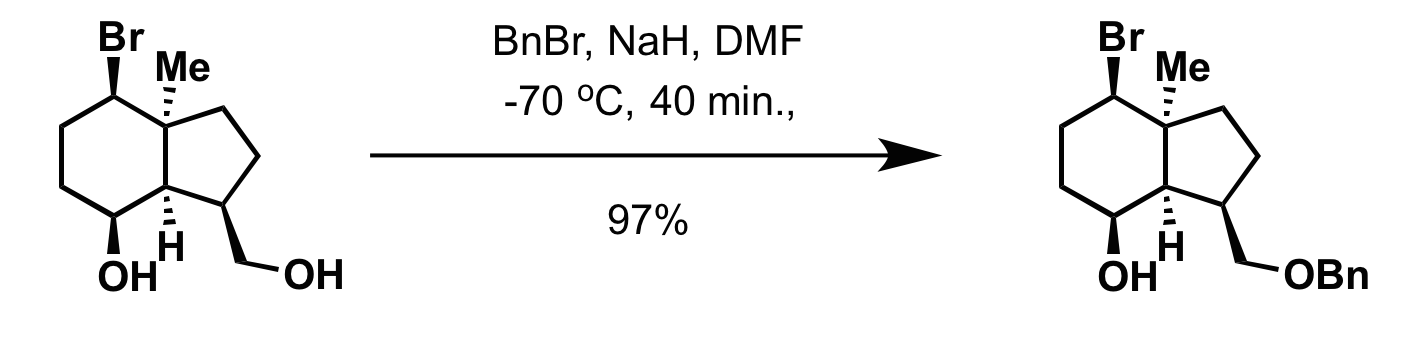
- Monobenzylation of diols can be achieved using Ag_{2}O in dimethylformamide (DMF) at ambient to elevated temperatures
- Primary alcohols can be selectively benzylated in presence of phenol functional groups using Cu(acac)_{2}

=== Deprotection methods ===
Benzyl ethers can be removed under reductive conditions, oxidative conditions, and the use of Lewis acids.

- Removed using hydrogenolysis
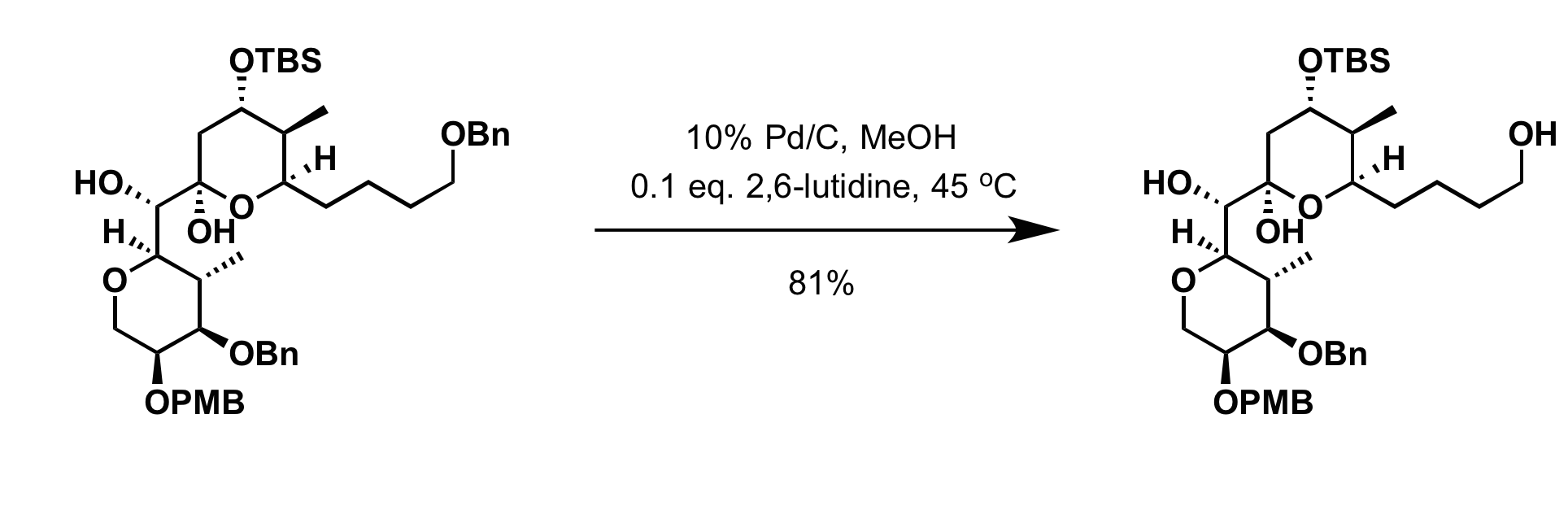
- Single electron process with Na/NH_{3} or Li/NH_{3}
- Benzyl protecting groups can be removed using a wide range of oxidizing agents including:
  - CrO_{3}/acetic acid at ambient temperature
  - Ozone
  - N-Bromosuccinimide (NBS)
  - N-Iodosuccinimide (NIS)
- Trimethylsilyl iodide (Me_{3}SiI) in dichloromethane at ambient temperature (selectivity can be achieved under specific conditions)

=== The p-methoxybenzyl protecting group ===
p-Methoxybenzyl (PMB) is used as a protecting group for alcohols in organic synthesis (4-Methoxybenzylthiol is used to protect thiols).

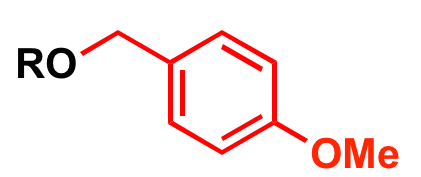
The p-methoxybenzyl group

- Strong base such as powdered potassium hydroxide or sodium hydride and p-methoxybenzyl halide (chloride or bromide)
- 4-methoxybenzyl-2,2,2-trichloroacetimidate can be used to install the PMB group in presence of:
  - Scandium (III) triflate (Sc(OTf)_{3}) in toluene at 0 °C
  - Trifluoromethanesulfonic acid (TfOH) in dichloromethane at 0 °C
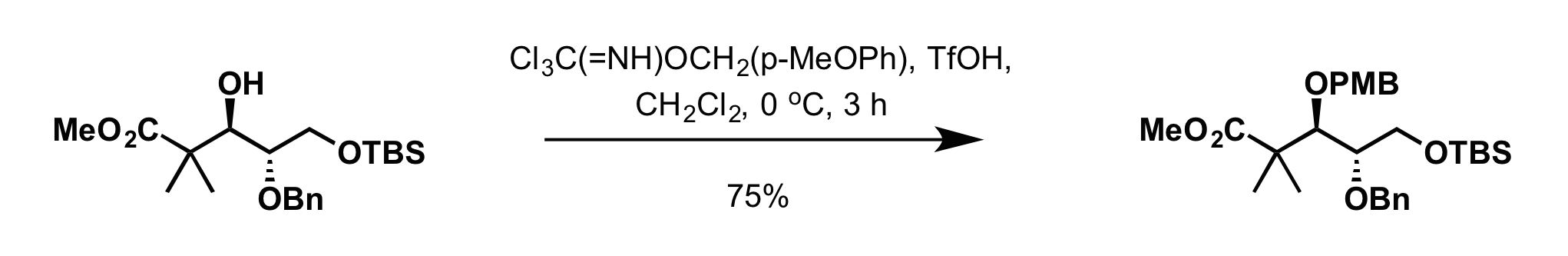

==== Deprotection methods ====
- 2,3-Dichloro-5,6-dicyano-p-benzoquinone (DDQ)
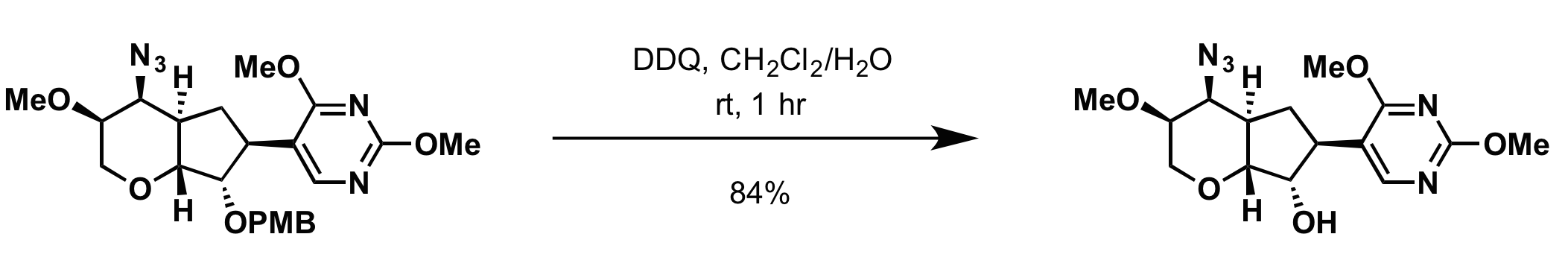
- Conditions for deprotection of benzyl group are applicable for cleavage of the PMB protecting group

=== Amine protection ===
The benzyl group is occasionally used as a protecting group for amines in organic synthesis. Other methods exist.

- Aqueous potassium carbonate and benzyl halide (BnCl, BnBr) in methanol
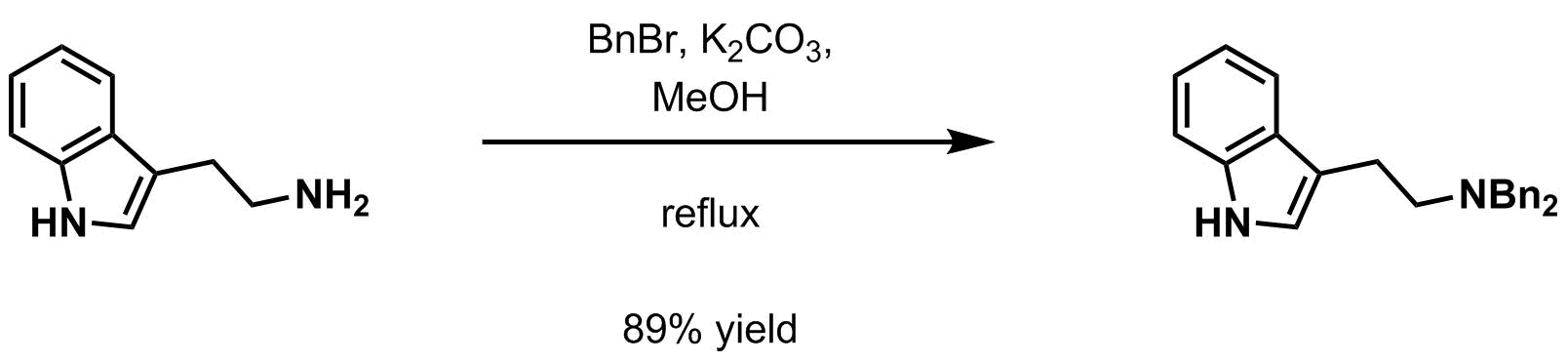
- Benzaldehyde, 6 M HCl and NaBH_{3}CN in methanol
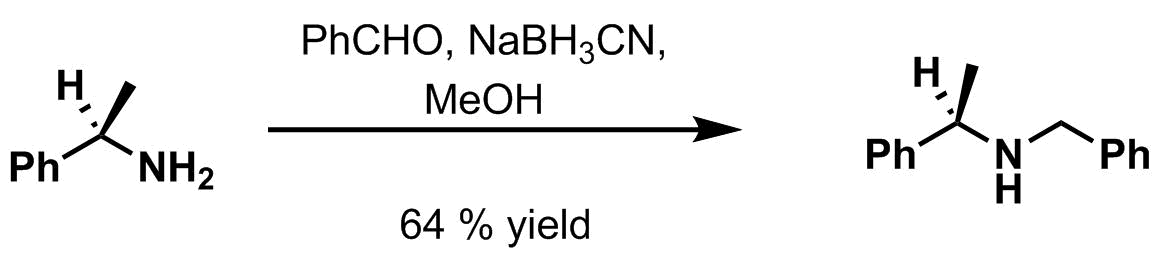

==== Deprotection methods ====
- Hydrogenation in the presence of the palladium catalyst

Structure of tetrabenzylzirconium with H atoms omitted for clarity.

== See also ==
- Benzylamine
