= Dibenzyl sulfide =

Names
- Preferred IUPAC name 1,1′-[Sulfanediylbis(methylene)]dibenzene
- Other names 1,1′-[Thiobis(methylene)]dibenzene; Benzyl thioether; dibenzyl sulfide

Identifiers
CAS Number	538-74-9
3D model (JSmol)	Interactive image
Beilstein Reference	1911157
ChEMBL	ChEMBL1369381
ChemSpider	10407
ECHA InfoCard	100.007.913
EC Number	208-703-6
PubChem CID	10867
UNII	Q08048624M
UN number	3335
CompTox Dashboard (EPA)	DTXSID6024599
- InChI: InChI=1S/C14H14S/c1-3-7-13(8-4-1)11-15-12-14-9-5-2-6-10-14/h1-10H,11-12H2 Key: LUFPJJNWMYZRQE-UHFFFAOYSA-N
- SMILES: C1=CC=C(C=C1)CSCC2=CC=CC=C2

Properties
Chemical formula	C_{14}H_{14}S
Molar mass	214.33 g·mol^{−1}
Melting point	49.5 °C (121.1 °F; 322.6 K)
Boiling point	322 °C (612 °F; 595 K)

Related compounds
Related compounds	Dibenzyl ether
- Except where otherwise noted, data are given for materials in their standard state (at 25 °C [77 °F], 100 kPa). Infobox references

Dibenzyl sulfide is an organic compound with the formula (C_{6}H_{5}CH_{2})_{2}S. It is a symmetrical thioether. It contains two C_{6}H_{5}CH_{2}- (benzyl) groups linked by a sulfide bridge. It is a colorless or white solid that is soluble in nonpolar solvents.

== Crystallography ==
The crystal structure of the solid is of the orthorhombic system with space group Pbcn; number 60. The unit cell dimensions are a=13.991 Å b=11.3985 Å c 7.2081 Å. The molecules in the gas take the same form as in the solid with a C_{2} symmetry.

== Production ==
Benzyl sulfide is commercially manufactured by treating potassium sulfide with benzyl chloride, followed by distillation of the product. It is also obtainable by desulfurization of dibenzyldisulfide with phosphine reagents.
