= N-benzyloxycarbonylglycine hydrolase =

Class of enzymes

Identifiers
- EC no.: 3.5.1.58
- CAS no.: 91930-69-7

Databases
- BRENDA: enzyme data
- ExPASy: NiceZyme view
- KEGG: enzyme entry
- MetaCyc: metabolic pathway
- Rhea: reactions
- PDB structures: RCSB PDB PDBe PDBsum
- Gene Ontology: AmiGO / QuickGO
Search
- PMC: articles
- PubMed: articles
- NCBI: proteins

N-benzyloxycarbonylglycine hydrolase (EC 3.5.1.58) is an enzyme characterised from Streptococcus faecalis that catalyzes the hydrolysis of N-benzyloxycarbonylglycine to benzyl alcohol, glycine, and carbon dioxide:

N-benzyloxycarbonylglycine
H_{2}O
CO_{2}
benzyl alcohol
+
glycine

This enzyme is a hydrolase, one acting on carbon-nitrogen bonds other than peptide bonds, specifically in linear amides. The systematic name of this enzyme class is N-benzyloxycarbonylglycine urethanehydrolase. Other names in common use include benzyloxycarbonylglycine hydrolase, Nalpha-carbobenzoxyamino acid amidohydrolase, Nalpha-benzyloxycarbonyl amino acid urethane hydrolase, and Nalpha-benzyloxycarbonyl amino acid urethane hydrolase I. It requires zinc or cobalt as cofactors.
