= Nα-benzyloxycarbonylleucine hydrolase =

N^{α}-benzyloxycarbonylleucine hydrolase

Identifiers
- EC no.: 3.5.1.64
- CAS no.: 100630-47-5

Databases
- BRENDA: enzyme data
- ExPASy: NiceZyme view
- KEGG: enzyme entry
- MetaCyc: metabolic pathway
- Rhea: reactions
- PDB structures: RCSB PDB PDBe PDBsum
- Gene Ontology: AmiGO / QuickGO
Search
- PMC: articles
- PubMed: articles
- NCBI: proteins

N^{α}-benzyloxycarbonylleucine hydrolase (EC 3.5.1.64) is an enzyme characterised from a soil microorganism that catalyzes the hydrolysis of the carbamate, N-benzyloxycarbonyl-L-leucine, to benzyl alcohol, carbon dioxide and L-leucine:

N-benzyloxycarbonyl-L-leucine
H_{2}O
CO_{2}
benzyl alcohol
+
L-leucine

This enzyme is a hydrolase, one acting on carbon-nitrogen bonds other than peptide bonds, specifically in linear amides. The systematic name of this enzyme class is Nalpha-benzyloxycarbonyl-L-leucine urethanehydrolase. Other names in use include benzyloxycarbonylleucine hydrolase, Nalpha-benzyloxycarbonyl amino acid urethane hydrolase IV, and alpha-N-benzyloxycarbonyl-L-leucine urethanehydrolase.
