= Benzyl bromide =

Skeletal structure of the benzyl bromide molecule
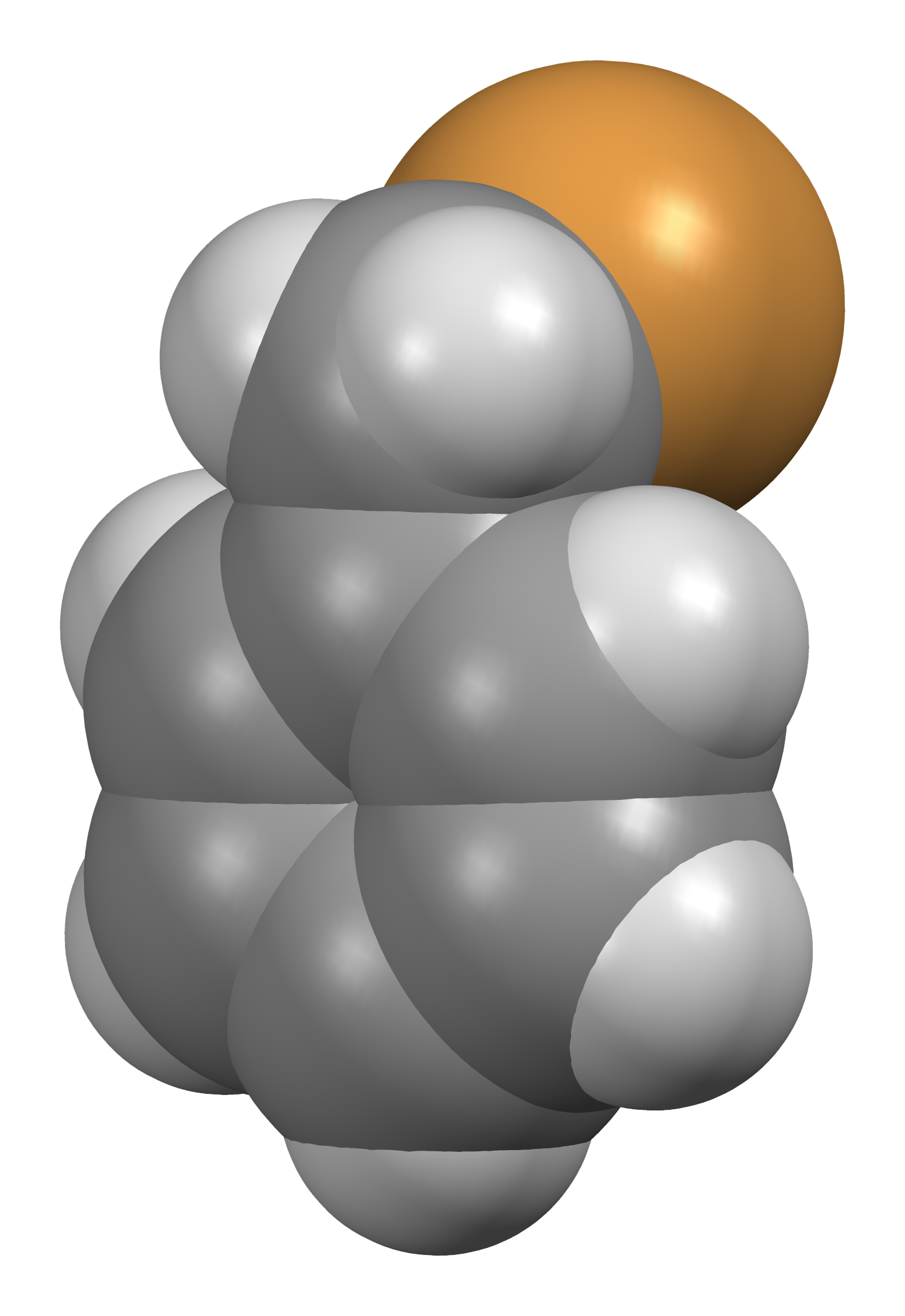
3D structure of the benzyl bromide molecule

Names
- Preferred IUPAC name (Bromomethyl)benzene
- Other names α-Bromotoluene; Benzyl bromide

Identifiers
CAS Number	100-39-0
3D model (JSmol)	Interactive image; Interactive image
Abbreviations	BnBr
ChEBI	CHEBI:59858
ChEMBL	ChEMBL1085946
ChemSpider	13851576
ECHA InfoCard	100.002.589
IUPHAR/BPS	6294
PubChem CID	7498
UNII	XR75BS721D
CompTox Dashboard (EPA)	DTXSID8024658
- InChI: InChI=1S/C7H7Br/c8-6-7-4-2-1-3-5-7/h1-5H,6H2 Key: AGEZXYOZHKGVCM-UHFFFAOYSA-N; InChI=1/C7H7Br/c8-6-7-4-2-1-3-5-7/h1-5H,6H2 Key: AGEZXYOZHKGVCM-UHFFFAOYAM
- SMILES: BrCc1ccccc1; c1ccc(cc1)CBr

Properties
Chemical formula	C_{7}H_{7}Br
Molar mass	171.037 g·mol^{−1}
Appearance	Colorless liquid
Odor	Sharp and pungent
Density	1.438 g/cm^{3}
Melting point	−3.9 °C (25.0 °F; 269.2 K)
Boiling point	201 °C (394 °F; 474 K)
Solubility	organic solvents
log P	2.92
Refractive index (n_{D})	1.5752

Hazards
- GHS labelling
Pictograms	(GHS07: Exclamation mark)
Flash point	70 °C (158 °F; 343 K)
- Except where otherwise noted, data are given for materials in their standard state (at 25 °C [77 °F], 100 kPa). verify (what is ?) Infobox references

Benzyl bromide is an organic compound with the formula C_{7}H_{7}Br or C_{6}H_{5}CH_{2}Br. The molecule consists of a benzene ring substituted with a bromomethyl group. It is a colorless liquid with lachrymatory properties. The compound is a reagent for introducing benzyl groups.

== Synthesis and structure ==
Benzyl bromide can be synthesized by the bromination of toluene under conditions suitable for a free radical halogenation:

The structure has been examined by electron diffraction.

== Applications ==
Benzyl bromide is used in organic synthesis for the introduction of the benzyl groups when the less expensive benzyl chloride is insufficiently reactive. Benzylations are often achieved in the presence of catalytic amounts of sodium iodide, which generates the more reactive benzyl iodide in situ. In some cases, benzyl serves as protecting group for alcohols and carboxylic acids.

== Safety ==
Benzyl bromide is a strong lachrymator and is also intensely irritating to skin and mucous membranes. Because of these properties, it has been used in chemical warfare, both in combat and in training due to its irritating yet non-lethal nature.

== See also ==
- Benzyl chloride
- Benzyl fluoride
- Benzyl iodide
- Xylyl bromide
