= Poly(p-phenylene methylene) =

Organic polymer with the formula (C6H4CH2)n

Structure of poly(p-phenylene methylene)

Poly(p-phenylene methylene) is an organic polymer with the formula (C_{6}H_{4}CH_{2})_{n}. In the simplest formulation, it consists of 1,4-phenylene rings linked by methylene groups. It however likely consists of various linkages, in addition to the 1,4 motif. Samples are amorphous and colorless. It is also known as polybenzyl.

Also called poly(benzyl), it was first observed by Friedel and Crafts who treated benzyl chloride with aluminium trichloride:.

n C_{6}H_{5}CH_{2}Cl → (C_{6}H_{4}CH_{2})_{n} + n HCl

It also arises by acid-catalyzed dehydration of benzyl alcoholl:

n C_{6}H_{5}CH_{2}OH → (C_{6}H_{4}CH_{2})_{n} + n H_{2}O

Because the reaction is highly exothermic, safety regulations warn against heating bulk benzyl alcohol.

A more modern route entails acid-catalyzed polymerization from tribenzylborate.

== Related compounds ==
- Parylene, (CH_{2}C_{6}H_{4}CH_{2})_{n}
