= Conformal coating =

Coating used on PCBs

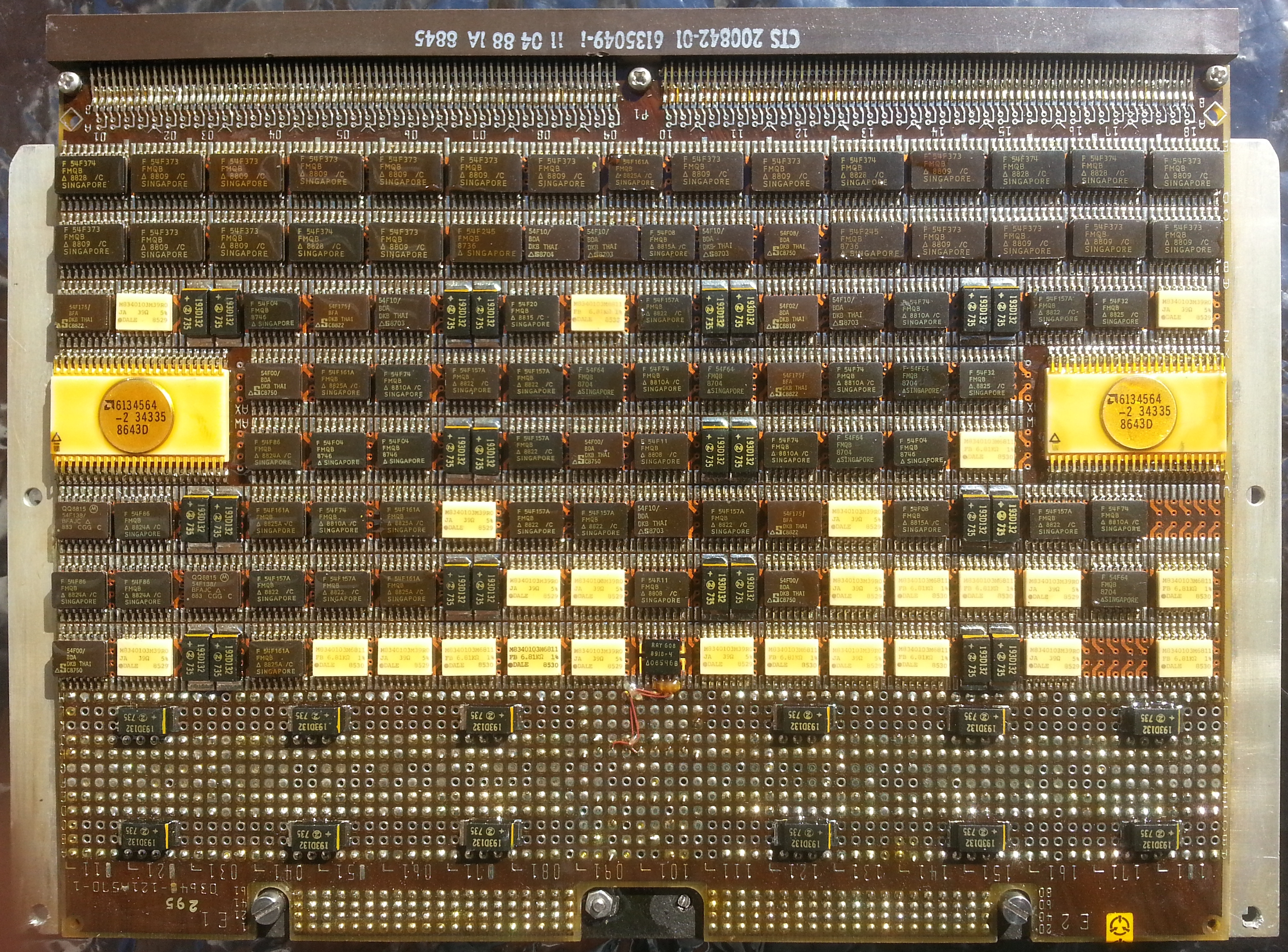
An IBM circuit board from a NASA Space Shuttle computer with a conformal coating applied

Conformal coating is a protective, breathable coating of thin polymeric film applied to printed circuit boards (PCBs). Conformal coatings are typically applied with 25–250 μm thickness on electronic circuitry to protect against moisture and other substances.

Coatings can be applied in many ways, including brushing, spraying, dispensing, and dip coating. Many materials can be used as conformal coatings depending on manufacturer needs, such as acrylic, silicone, urethane, and parylene. Many circuit board assembly firms apply a layer of transparent conformal coating to assemblies as an alternative to potting.

Conformal coatings are used to protect electronic components from possible environmental exposure; they allow moisture to escape but protect against contamination. More recently, conformal coatings are being used to reduce the formation of whiskers and to prevent current bleed between closely positioned components.

== Applications ==
Conformal coatings of PCBA where it is UV-cured

Precision analogue circuitry may suffer degraded accuracy if insulating surfaces become contaminated with ionic substances, such as fingerprint residues, that become mildly conductive in higher humidity. A suitably chosen material coating can reduce the effects of mechanical stress and vibrations on the circuit and its ability to perform in extreme temperatures.

For example, in a chip-on-board assembly process, a silicon die is mounted on the board with an adhesive or soldering process, and then it is electrically connected by wire bonding, typically with 25.4 μm diameter gold or aluminum wire. The chip and the wire are delicate, so they are encapsulated in a version of the conformal coating called a blob top. This prevents accidental contact from damaging the wires or the chip. Another use of conformal coating is to increase the voltage rating of a dense circuit assembly. An insulation coating can withstand a stronger electric voltage than air, particularly at high altitudes.

Excluding Parylene, most organic coatings are easily penetrated by water molecules. A coating preserves the performance of electronics primarily by preventing contaminants that can ionize, such as salts, from reaching circuit nodes and combining with water to form a microscopically thin electrolyte film. The coating is more effective if all surface contamination is removed first, using a highly repeatable industrial process such as vapor degreasing or semi-aqueous washing. Pinholes would make contact with circuit nodes and form undesired conductive paths.

== Methods ==
The coating material can be applied by brushing, spraying, dipping, or selective coating by robots. Nearly all modern conformal coatings contain a fluorescent dye to aid in vapor coverage inspection.

=== Brush coating ===
Brush coating works by coating the material onto the board and is suitable for low-volume application. The finish is thick and tends to be subject to defects such as bubbles.

=== Spray application coating ===
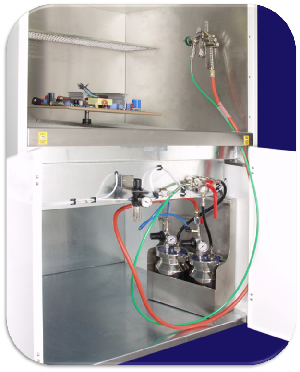
Conformal coating spray booth

Spray coating can be completed with a spray aerosol or spray gun and is suitable for low- and medium-volume processing. The coating application may be limited due to 3D effects. The masking requirements have less penetration. This method can be used in spray booths for medium-scale production.

=== Conformal coating dipping ===
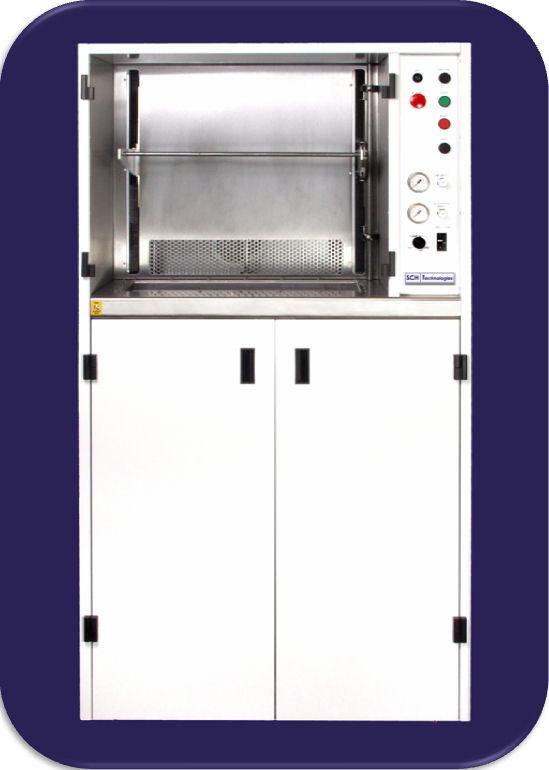
Conformal coating dip system

If the printed circuit board (PCB) is designed appropriately, it can be the highest volume technique. However, the coating penetrates everywhere, including beneath devices, so many PCB designs are unsuitable for dipping.

An issue of thin tip coverage, where the material slumps around sharp edges, can be a problem, especially in a condensing atmosphere. This tip coverage effect can be addressed by either double-dipping the PCB or using several thin layers of atomized spraying.

=== Selective coating by machine ===
Selective coating by machine uses a needle and an atomized spray applicator, a non-atomized spray, or an ultrasonic valve technology that can move above the circuit board and spray the coating material in select areas. Flow rates and material viscosity are programmed into the computer system, controlling the application so that the desired coating thickness is maintained. This method is effective for large volumes, provided that the PCB is designed for the method. There are limitations in the select coat process, such as capillary effects around low-profile connectors that absorb the coating accidentally.

The process quality of dip or dam-and-fill coating and non-atomized spray technology can be improved by applying and then releasing a vacuum while the assembly is submerged in the liquid resin. This forces the liquid resin into all crevices.

=== Solvent- and water-based conformal coatings ===
For standard solvent-based acrylics, air drying (film formation) is the normal process except where speed is essential. Heat curing can then be used, using batch or inline ovens with conveyors.

=== UV conformal coatings ===
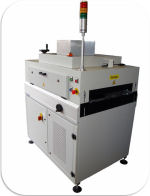
Ultraviolet Inline Conveyor for curing conformal coatings

UV curing of conformal coatings is becoming important for high-volume users in fields such as automotive and consumer electronics. These coatings have thermal cycling resistance.

=== Moisture curing ===
In moisture curing, the applied resin coating is reactive to moisture in the atmosphere and polymerizes with exposure, creating a homogenized coating. The curing process can take up to a few days to complete.

== Thickness and measurement ==
Coating material (after curing) should have a thickness of 30–130 μm (0.0012–0.0051 in) when using acrylic resin, epoxy resin, or urethane resin. For silicone resin, the coating thickness recommended by the IPC standards is 50–210 μm (0.0020–0.0083 in).

There are several methods for measuring coating thickness, and they fall into two categories: wet film and dry film.

=== Wet film conformal coating measurement ===
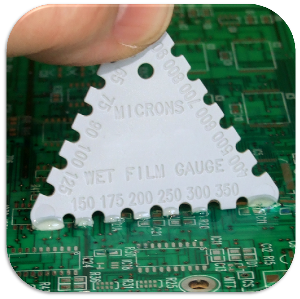
Wet film gauge for conformal coating thickness measurement

Wet film measurements are for conformal coatings where the dry film thickness can only be measured destructively or through the over-application of conformal coating. The wet film gauges are applied to the wet conformal coating; the teeth indicate the coating thickness.

=== Dry film conformal coating thickness measurement ===
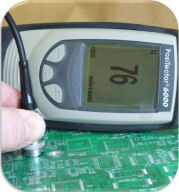
Dry film conformal coating thickness measurement

An alternative to wet film measurement is by using eddy currents. The system works by placing the test head on the surface of the conformal coating.

When liquid water is present, a pinhole can form in the coating. This is considered a defect and can be eliminated with appropriate steps and training. These techniques effectively "pot" or "conform" to components by completely covering them.

== Inspection ==
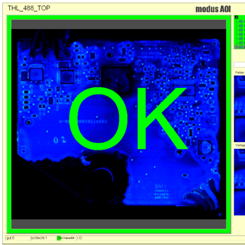
Conformal Coating AOI

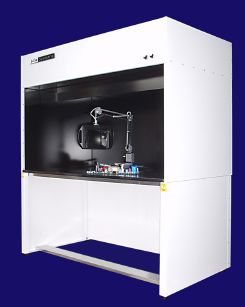
Conformal Coating Inspection Booth

Traditionally, conformal coating inspection has been done manually. An inspector usually examines each PCB under a high-intensity, long-wave ultraviolet lamp. Recent developments in conformal coating automated optical inspection (AOI) have begun to use Automated Inspection Systems, which can be camera- or scanner-based.

== Selection ==
Incorrect selection can affect long-term reliability of the circuit board as well as cause processing and cost problems.

The most common standards for conformal coating are IPC A-610 and IPC-CC-830. These standards list indications of good and bad coverage and describe various failure mechanisms, such as dewetting.

Another type of coating called parylene is applied with a vacuum deposition process at ambient temperature. Film coatings ranging from 0.100 to 76 μm can be applied in a single operation. The coating thickness is uniform, even on irregular surfaces. Desired contact points, such as battery contacts or connectors, must be covered with an air-tight mask to prevent the parylene from coating the contacts. Applying parylene is a batch process that does not lend itself to high-volume processing.

== Coating chemistry ==
Different materials offer unique properties that make them suitable for various applications. Below is a comparison of the properties of different conformal coating chemicals.

Material	Properties
Acrylic	Easy to rework; Simple drying process; Good moisture resistance; High fluorescence level; Ease of viscosity adjustment
Epoxy	Useful to about 150 °C (302 °F); Harder durometer, abrasion resistance; CTE closer to epoxy PCB substrate; Higher Tg (Glass transition); Good dielectric properties
Polyurethane	Good dielectric properties; Good moisture resistance; Solvent resistance; Less reversion potential; Abrasion resistance
Silicone	Stable over a wide temperature range (in general, −40 to 200 °C; −40 to 392 °F); Flexible, provides dampening and impact protection; Good moisture resistance; High dielectric strength; Low surface energy for better wetting
Poly-Para-Xylylene (Parylene)	Excellent uniformity regardless of part geometry; Chemical inertness; Minimal added mass and low out-gassing; Low environmental impact process; Low dielectric constant
Amorphous fluoropolymer	Low dielectric constant; High glass transition temperature; Low surface energy; Low water absorption; Solvent resistance
