= Dibenzyl ether =

- Skeletal formula of dibenzyl ether

Names
- Preferred IUPAC name 1,1′-[Oxybis(methylene)]dibenzene

Identifiers
CAS Number	103-50-4
3D model (JSmol)	Interactive image
ChEMBL	ChEMBL152299
ChemSpider	21105876
ECHA InfoCard	100.002.835
EC Number	203-118-2
PubChem CID	7657
UNII	2O6CNO27RJ
CompTox Dashboard (EPA)	DTXSID5025819
- InChI: InChI=1S/C14H14O/c1-3-7-13(8-4-1)11-15-12-14-9-5-2-6-10-14/h1-10H,11-12H2 Key: MHDVGSVTJDSBDK-UHFFFAOYSA-N
- SMILES: C1=CC=C(C=C1)COCC2=CC=CC=C2

Properties
Chemical formula	C_{14}H_{14}O
Molar mass	198.265 g·mol^{−1}
Appearance	colorless liquid
Density	1.043 g/cm^{3} (20 °C)
Melting point	3.6 °C (38.5 °F; 276.8 K)
Boiling point	298 °C (568 °F; 571 K)

Hazards
- GHS labelling
Pictograms	(GHS07: Exclamation mark) (GHS09: Environmental hazard)
Signal word	Warning
Hazard statements	H317, H319, H410, H411
Precautionary statements	P261, P264, P272, P273, P280, P302+P352, P305+P351+P338, P321, P333+P313, P337+P313, P363, P391, P501

Related compounds
Related compounds	Dibenzyl sulfide
- Except where otherwise noted, data are given for materials in their standard state (at 25 °C [77 °F], 100 kPa). Infobox references

Dibenzylether is an organic compound with the formula C_{14}H_{14}O or (C_{6}H_{5}CH_{2})_{2}O. It is classified as an ether derived from benzyl alcohol. A colorless, nearly odorless oil, the compound's main use is as a plasticizer. It is prepared by treating benzyl chloride with base.
