= Benzyl iodide =

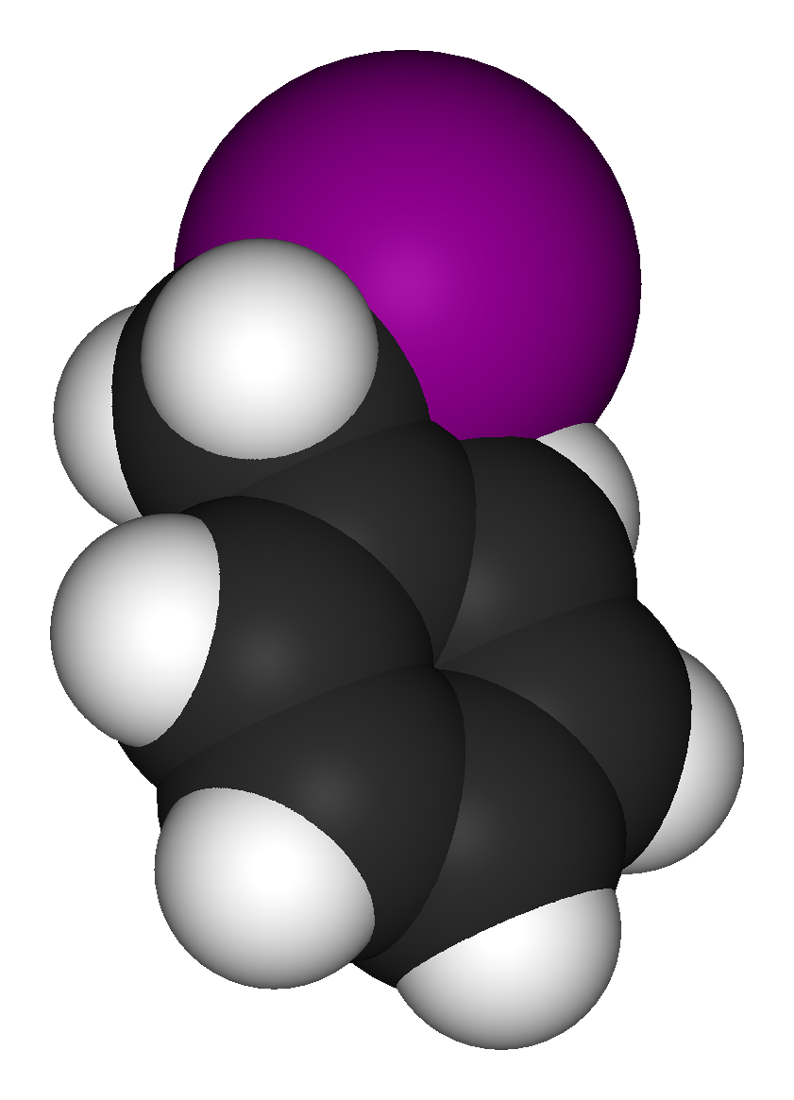
- Space-filling model

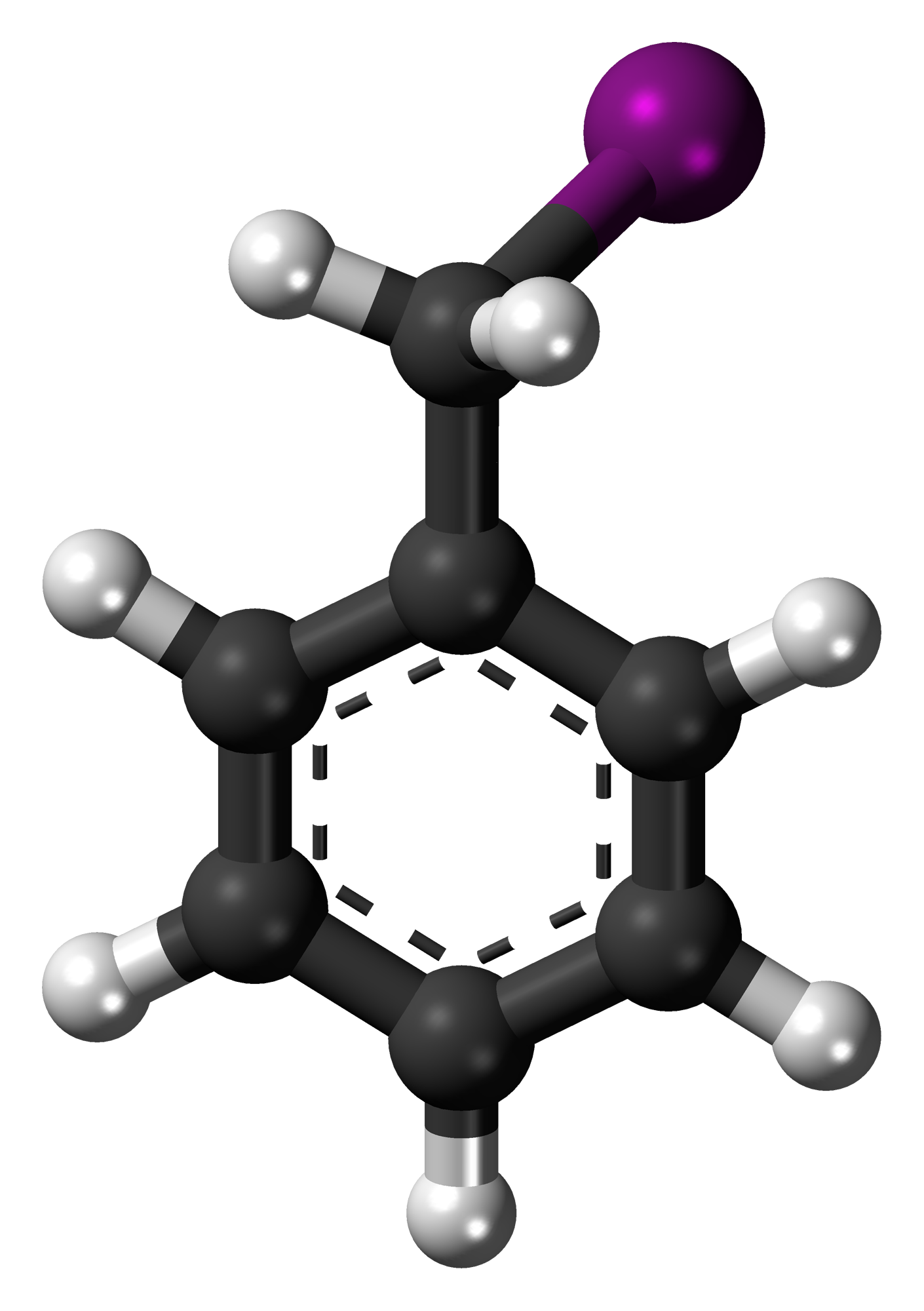
- Ball and stick model

Names
- Preferred IUPAC name (Iodomethyl)benzene
- Other names Fraissite, iodotoluol, α-iodotoluene, phenylmethyliodide

Identifiers
CAS Number	620-05-3
3D model (JSmol)	Interactive image
Abbreviations	BnI
ChemSpider	11601
ECHA InfoCard	100.009.659
PubChem CID	12098
UNII	859JV557EV
CompTox Dashboard (EPA)	DTXSID6060715
- InChI: InChI=1S/C7H7I/c8-6-7-4-2-1-3-5-7/h1-5H,6H2 Key: XJTQJERLRPWUGL-UHFFFAOYSA-N
- SMILES: C1=CC=C(C=C1)CI

Properties
Chemical formula	C_{7}H_{7}I
Molar mass	218.037 g·mol^{−1}
Appearance	Low-melting crystals or colorless liquid
Melting point	24.5 °C (76.1 °F; 297.6 K)
Boiling point	218 °C (424 °F; 491 K)
Solubility in water	Insoluble

Hazards
- GHS labelling
Pictograms	(GHS07: Exclamation mark) (GHS09: Environmental hazard)
Signal word	Warning
Flash point	86 °C (187 °F; 359 K)
- Except where otherwise noted, data are given for materials in their standard state (at 25 °C [77 °F], 100 kPa). Infobox references

Benzyl iodide is an organic compound with the chemical formula C_{7}H_{7}I. The compound consists of a benzene ring with an attached iodidemethyl group. The substance is an alkyl halide and is a constitutional isomer of the iodotoluenes.

== Synthesis ==
Benzyl iodide can be obtained via the Finkelstein reaction from benzyl chloride and sodium iodide in acetone.

Synthesis of benzyl iodide by Finkelstein reaction

== Properties ==
Benzyl iodide forms colorless to yellow needles, melting at 24.5 °C. As a liquid, the compound has the high refractive index of 1.6334. Benzyl iodide is also a powerful lachrymator.

== See also ==
- Benzyl bromide
- Benzyl chloride
- Benzyl fluoride
