= Gasping syndrome =

Gasping syndrome is a life-threatening condition characterized by multi-system failure, death and other symptoms resulting from benzyl alcohol poisoning.

== Symptoms ==
The symptoms caused by benzyl alcohol exposure include respiratory failure, hypotension, renal failure, severe metabolic acidosis, hematologic abnormalities, convulsions, paralysis gradual neurologic deterioration, cardiovascular collapse, sudden onset of gasping respiration, skin changes and vasodilation.

== See also ==
- Benzyl alcohol
