= Benzyl fluoride =

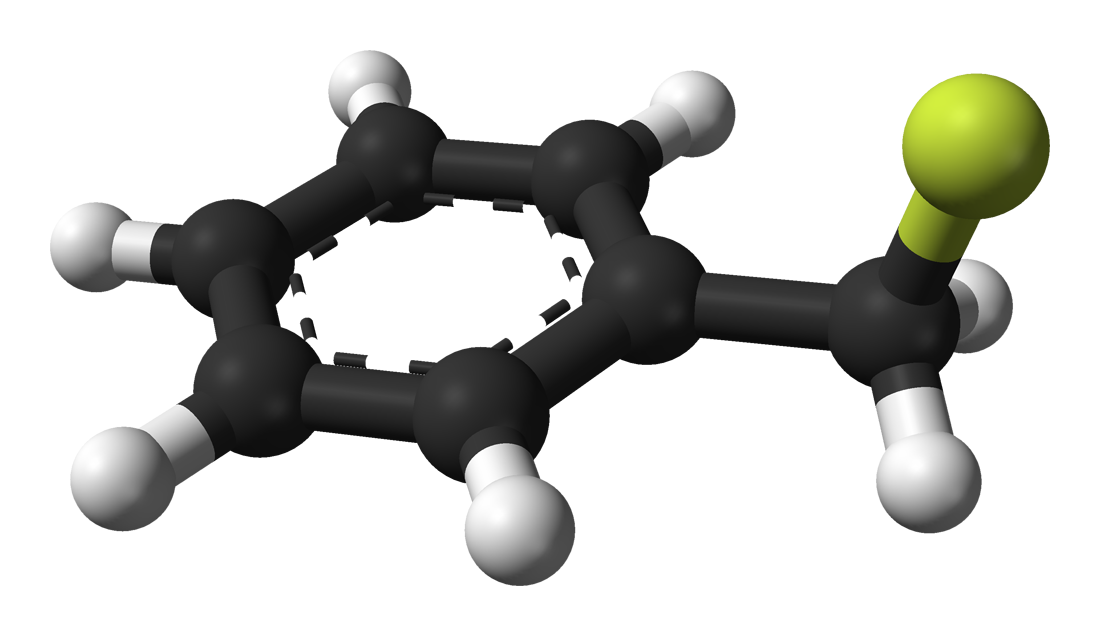

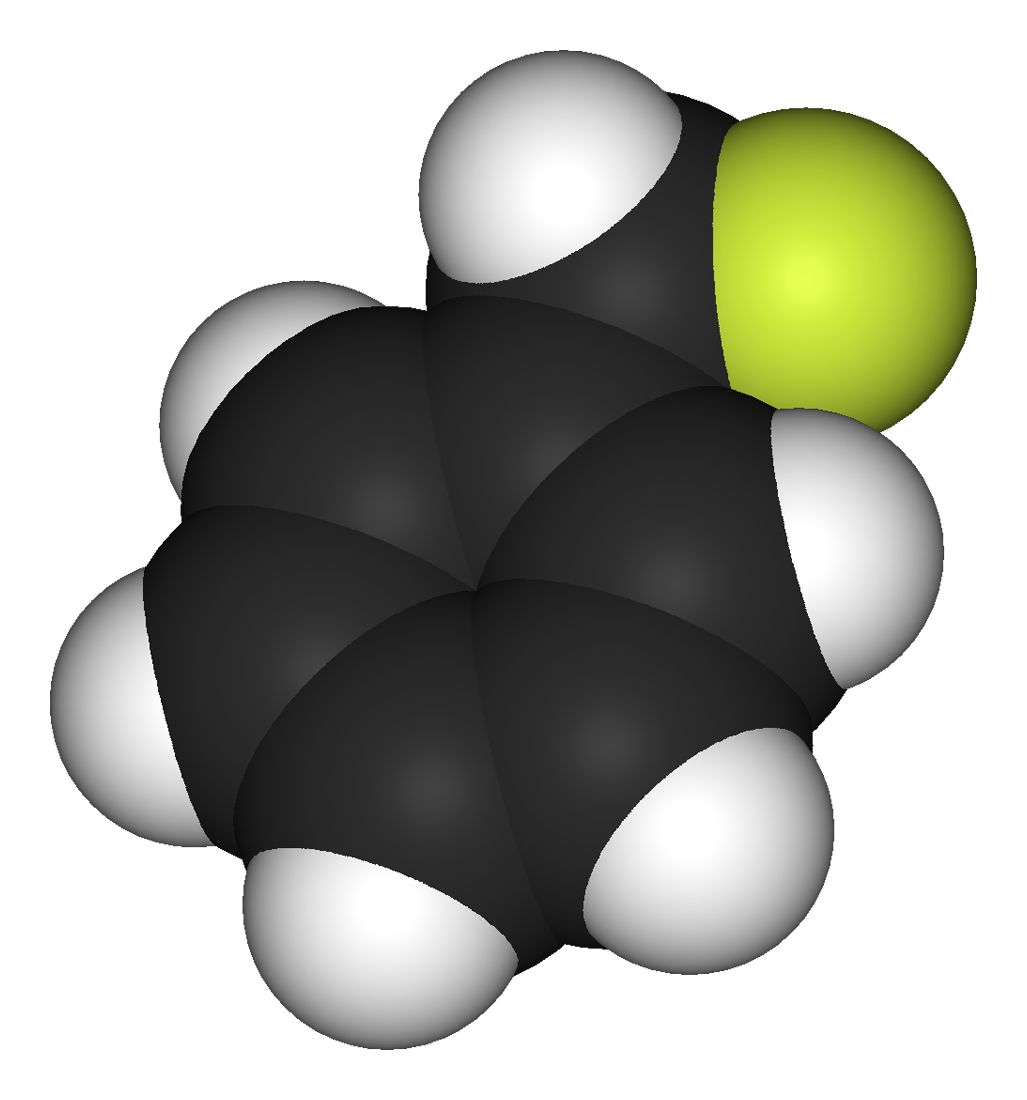

Names
- Preferred IUPAC name (Fluoromethyl)benzene
- Other names α-Fluorotoluene

Identifiers
CAS Number	350-50-5
3D model (JSmol)	Interactive image
Abbreviations	BnF
ChemSpider	9215
ECHA InfoCard	100.005.913
PubChem CID	9591
UNII	T7KNE39EHS
CompTox Dashboard (EPA)	DTXSID8059847
- InChI: InChI=1S/C7H7F/c8-6-7-4-2-1-3-5-7/h1-5H,6H2 Key: MBXXQYJBFRRFCK-UHFFFAOYSA-N; InChI=1/C7H7F/c8-6-7-4-2-1-3-5-7/h1-5H,6H2 Key: MBXXQYJBFRRFCK-UHFFFAOYAU
- SMILES: FCc1ccccc1

Properties
Chemical formula	C_{7}H_{7}F
Molar mass	110.131 g·mol^{−1}
Appearance	Colorless liquid
Density	1.0228 g/cm^{3}
Melting point	−35 °C (−31 °F; 238 K)
Boiling point	140 °C (284 °F; 413 K)

Hazards
Safety data sheet (SDS)	"External MSDS"
- Except where otherwise noted, data are given for materials in their standard state (at 25 °C [77 °F], 100 kPa). verify (what is ?) Infobox references

Benzyl fluoride is an organic compound consisting of a benzene ring substituted with a fluoromethyl group.

== See also ==
- Benzyl chloride
- Benzyl bromide
- Benzyl iodide
