= 4-Methoxybenzylthiol =

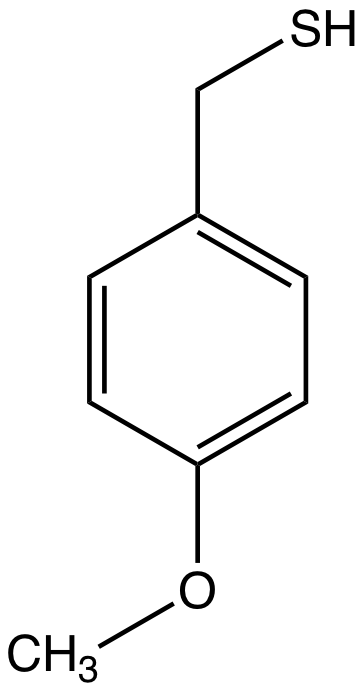

Names
- Preferred IUPAC name (4-Methoxyphenyl)methanethiol
- Other names p-methoxybenzylmercaptan

Identifiers
CAS Number	6258-60-2
3D model (JSmol)	Interactive image
ChEMBL	ChEMBL1224560
ChemSpider	72623
ECHA InfoCard	100.025.812
EC Number	228-393-6
PubChem CID	80407
UNII	9FTY888ZTV
CompTox Dashboard (EPA)	DTXSID80211617
- InChI: InChI=1S/C8H10OS/c1-9-8-4-2-7(6-10)3-5-8/h2-5,10H,6H2,1H3 Key: PTDVPWWJRCOIIO-UHFFFAOYSA-N
- SMILES: COc1ccc(cc1)CS

Properties
Chemical formula	C_{8}H_{10}OS
Molar mass	154.23 g·mol^{−1}
Appearance	colorless liquid
Boiling point	89–94 °C (192–201 °F; 362–367 K) 2.5 mm Hg
- Except where otherwise noted, data are given for materials in their standard state (at 25 °C [77 °F], 100 kPa). Infobox references

4-Methoxybenzylthiol is an organosulfur compound with the formula CH_{3}OC_{6}H_{4}CH_{2}SH. A colorless, odiferous oil, it is a reagent used as a protected thiol.
