= Benzyl chloride =

Aromatic organochlorine compound

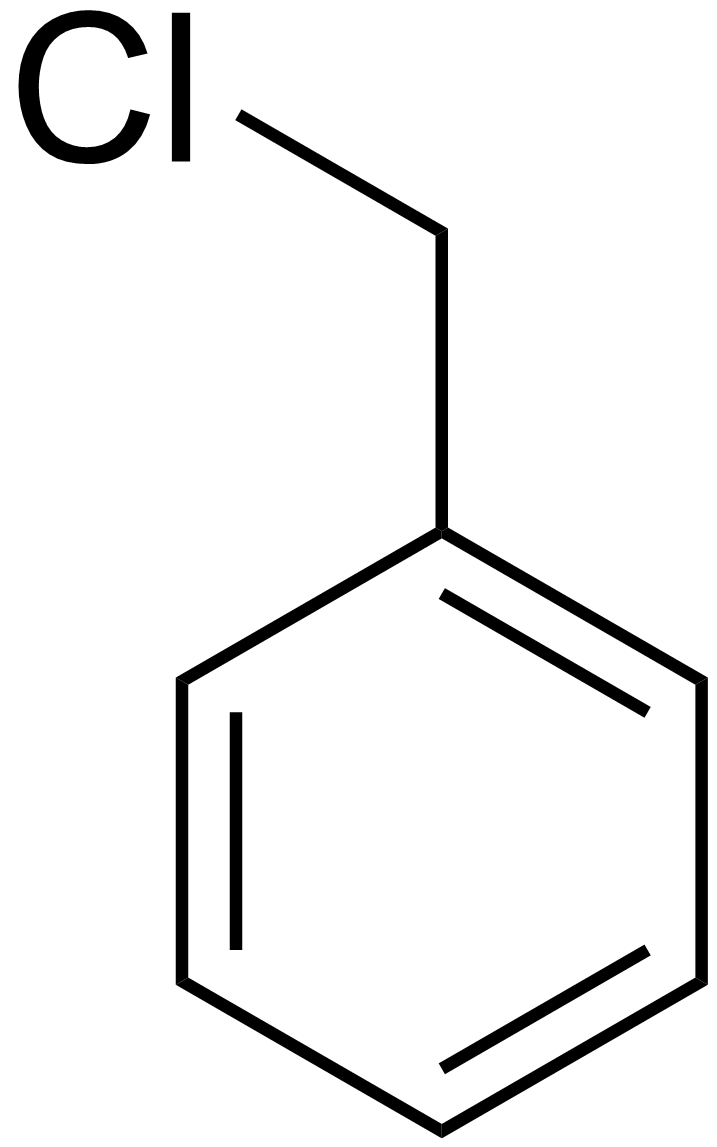
Benzyl chloride
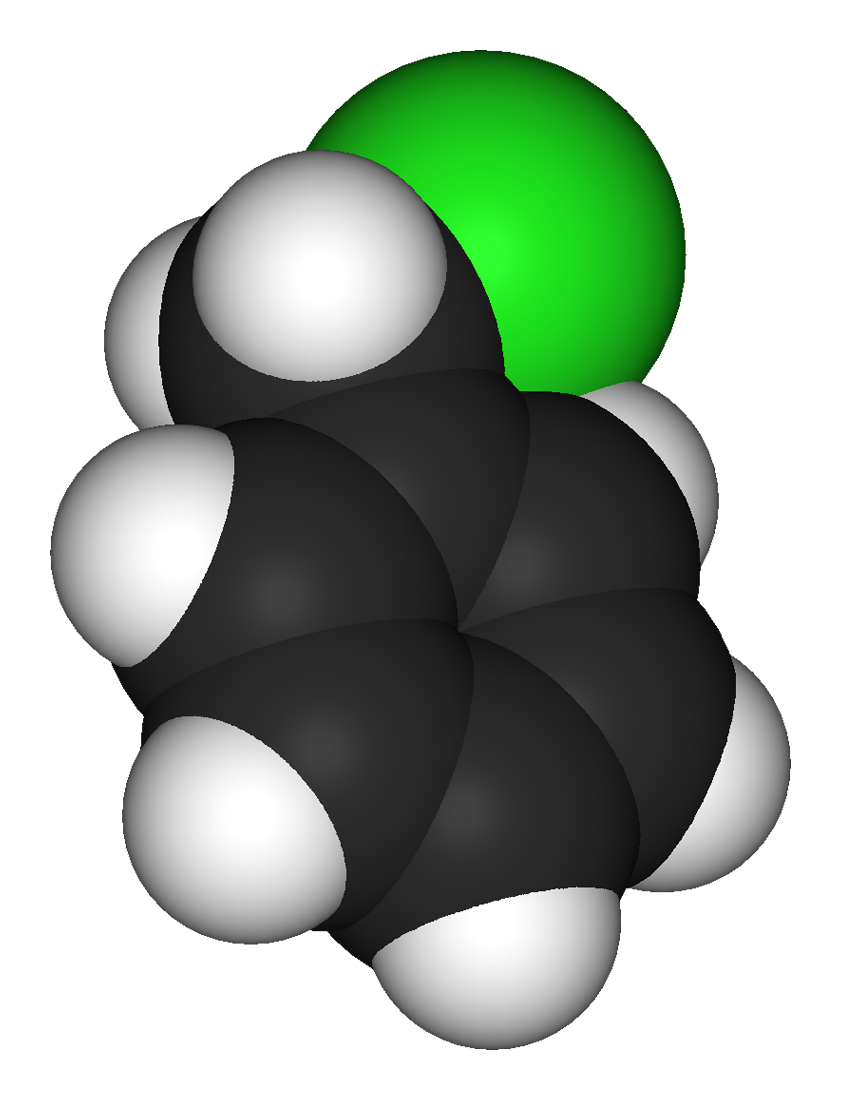

Names
- Preferred IUPAC name (Chloromethyl)benzene
- Other names α-Chlorotoluene; Benzyl chloride alpha-chlorophenylmethane

Identifiers
CAS Number	100-44-7
3D model (JSmol)	Interactive image
Abbreviations	BnCl
ChEBI	CHEBI:615597
ChEMBL	ChEMBL498878
ChemSpider	13840690
ECHA InfoCard	100.002.594
EC Number	202-853-6
KEGG	C19167
PubChem CID	7503
UNII	83H19HW7K6
CompTox Dashboard (EPA)	DTXSID0020153
- InChI: InChI=1S/C7H7Cl/c8-6-7-4-2-1-3-5-7/h1-5H,6H2 Key: KCXMKQUNVWSEMD-UHFFFAOYSA-N; InChI=1/C7H7Cl/c8-6-7-4-2-1-3-5-7/h1-5H,6H2 Key: KCXMKQUNVWSEMD-UHFFFAOYAV
- SMILES: ClCc1ccccc1

Properties
Chemical formula	C_{7}H_{7}Cl
Molar mass	126.58 g·mol^{−1}
Appearance	Colorless to slightly yellow, toxic liquid
Odor	Pungent, aromatic
Density	1.100 g/cm^{3}
Melting point	−39 °C (−38 °F; 234 K)
Boiling point	179 °C (354 °F; 452 K)
Solubility in water	very slightly soluble (0.05% at 20 °C)
Solubility	soluble in ethanol, ethyl ether, chloroform, CCl_{4} miscible in organic solvents
Vapor pressure	1 mmHg (20 °C)
Magnetic susceptibility (χ)	−81.98·10^{−6} cm^{3}/mol
Refractive index (n_{D})	1.5415 (15 °C)

Hazards
- Occupational safety and health (OHS/OSH)
Main hazards	Toxic and carcinogenic; lachrymator
- GHS labelling
Pictograms	(GHS05: Corrosive) (GHS06: Toxic) (GHS08: Health hazard)
Signal word	Danger
Hazard statements	H302, H315, H318, H331, H335, H350, H373
Precautionary statements	P203, P260, P264, P264+P265, P270, P271, P280, P301+P317, P302+P352, P304+P340, P305+P354+P338, P316, P317, P318, P319, P321, P330, P332+P317, P362+P364, P403+P233, P405, P501
NFPA 704 (fire diamond)	3 2 1
Flash point	67 °C (153 °F; 340 K)
Autoignition temperature	585 °C (1,085 °F; 858 K)
Explosive limits	≥1.1%
- Lethal dose or concentration (LD, LC)
LD_{50} (median dose)	121 mg/kg (rat, oral)
LC_{50} (median concentration)	150 ppm (rat, 2 hr); 80 ppm (mouse, 2 hr)
LC_{Lo} (lowest published)	380 ppm (dog, 8 hr)
- NIOSH (US health exposure limits)
PEL (Permissible)	TWA 1 ppm (5 mg/m^{3})
REL (Recommended)	C 1 ppm (5 mg/m^{3}) [15-minute]
IDLH (Immediate danger)	10 ppm
Safety data sheet (SDS)	External MSDS
- Except where otherwise noted, data are given for materials in their standard state (at 25 °C [77 °F], 100 kPa). verify (what is ?) Infobox references

Benzyl chloride, or α-chlorotoluene, is an organic compound with the formula C_{6}H_{5}CH_{2}Cl. This colorless liquid is a reactive organochlorine compound that is a widely used alkylating agent. Its strong alkylating tendency renders it hazardous.

== Preparation ==
Benzyl chloride is prepared industrially by the gas-phase photochemical reaction of toluene with chlorine:

C_{6}H_{5}CH_{3} + Cl_{2} → C_{6}H_{5}CH_{2}Cl + HCl

In this way, approximately 100,000 tonnes are produced annually. The reaction proceeds by the free radical process, involving the intermediacy of free chlorine atoms. Side products of the reaction include benzal chloride and benzotrichloride.

Other methods of production exist, such as the Blanc chloromethylation of benzene. Benzyl chloride was first prepared from treatment of benzyl alcohol with hydrochloric acid.

== Uses and reactions ==
Industrially, benzyl chloride is precursor to benzyl esters, which are used as plasticizers, flavorants, and perfumes. Quaternary ammonium salts, such as the benzalkonium chlorides used as surfactants, are produced by alkylation of tertiary amines with benzyl chloride.

Benzyl chloride is more electrophilic and a stronger alkylating agent than typical alkyl chlorides. This behavior is the basis of its lachrymatory nature.

Some of the extensive use of benzyl chloride as a reagent is documented in Organic syntheses, which describes procedures for the alkylation of thiourea, indoles and amines, and carbanions and enolates. Cyanide displaces chloride from benzyl chloride. The resulting benzyl cyanide is a precursor to phenylacetic acid, a precursor to pharmaceuticals and commercial fragrances. Phenols and alcohols are common oxygen-containing substrates, the product being benzyl ethers. In organic synthesis, these ethers serve as protecting groups. Debenzylation of such ethers can be achieved by hydrogenolysis using palladium on carbon.

C_{6}H_{5}CH_{2}OR + H_{2} → C_{6}H_{5}CH_{3} + HOR

Benzyl chloride undergoes hydrolysis to form benzyl alcohol:

C_{6}H_{5}CH_{2}Cl + H_{2}O → C_{6}H_{5}CH_{2}OH + HCl

When treated with aqueous sodium hydroxide, benzyl chloride converts to benzyl alcohol and dibenzyl ether, depending on conditions.

Benzyl chloride also reacts readily with magnesium to produce a Grignard reagent. It is preferable over benzyl bromide for the preparation of this reagent, since the reaction of the bromide with magnesium tends to form the Wurtz coupling product 1,2-diphenylethane.

Benzyl chloride is used to install benzyl groups on aromatic substrates. For example, when benzyl chloride is treated with benzene and aluminium trichloride under the conditions of Friedel-Crafts alkylation, it gives diphenylmethane. Heating benzyl chloride in the presence of aluminium trichloride gives poly(p-phenylene methylene):

n C_{6}H_{5}CH_{2}Cl → (C_{6}H_{4}CH_{2})_{n} + n HCl

== Safety and regulations ==
Benzyl chloride is a lachrymator and has been used in chemical warfare. It is also very irritating to the skin.

It is classified as an extremely hazardous substance in the United States as defined in Section 302 of the U.S. Emergency Planning and Community Right-to-Know Act (42 U.S.C. 11002), and is subject to strict reporting requirements by facilities which produce, store, or use it in significant quantities.

Benzyl chloride may be used in the synthesis of amphetamine-class drugs, and for this reason, sales of benzyl chloride are monitored as a List II drug precursor chemical by the US Drug Enforcement Administration.

== See also ==
- Benzyl bromide
- Benzyl fluoride
- Benzyl iodide
- List of highly toxic gases
