= 2-Chloromethylpyridine =

Names
- Preferred IUPAC name 2-(Chloromethyl)pyridine
- Other names 2-Picolinyl chloride; 2-Picolyl chloride

Identifiers
CAS Number	4377-33-7
3D model (JSmol)	Interactive image
ChEBI	CHEBI:76601
ChEMBL	ChEMBL1620152
ChemSpider	21875
PubChem CID	23393
UNII	59YW2EH117
CompTox Dashboard (EPA)	DTXSID2043824
- InChI: InChI=1S/C6H6ClN/c7-5-6-3-1-2-4-8-6/h1-4H,5H2 Key: NJWIMFZLESWFIM-UHFFFAOYSA-N
- SMILES: C1=CC=NC(=C1)CCl

Properties
Chemical formula	C_{6}H_{6}ClN
Molar mass	127.57 g·mol^{−1}
Appearance	white solid
Melting point	79 °C (174 °F; 352 K)

Hazards
- GHS labelling
Pictograms	(GHS05: Corrosive) (GHS07: Exclamation mark)
Signal word	Danger
Hazard statements	H302, H314
Precautionary statements	P260, P264, P270, P280, P301+P312+P330, P301+P330+P331, P310, P363, P405, P501
- Except where otherwise noted, data are given for materials in their standard state (at 25 °C [77 °F], 100 kPa). Infobox references

2-Chloromethylpyridine is an organohalide that consists of a pyridine core bearing a chloromethyl group. It is one of three isomeric chloromethylpyridines, along with 3- and 4-chloromethylpyridine. It is an alkylating agent.

== Preparation and reactions ==
It can be prepared by reaction of 2-methylpyridine with chlorine. A more efficient route involves treating 2-picoline-N-oxide with phosphoryl chloride in the presence of triethylamine:

CH_{3}C_{5}H_{4}NO + POCl_{3} + Et_{3}N → ClCH_{2}C_{5}H_{4}N + Et_{3}NH^{+}[PO_{2}Cl_{2}]^{−} (Et = C_{2}H_{5})

A related method uses triphosgene in place of phosphoryl chloride.

2-Chloromethylpyridine is a precursor to pyridine-containing ligands.

== Safety ==
2-Chloromethylpyridine is an analogue of nitrogen mustards, and has been investigated for its mutagenicity.

== Applications ==
2-Picolyl chloride has application in the synthesis of the following drugs:

1. AD-35 [1531586-58-9]
2. Capravirine
3. Pifenate [15686-87-0]
4. Pimeprofen [64622-45-3]
5. SDZ NDD 094 [148257-48-1]
