= Boekelheide =

Boekelheide is a surname. Notable people with the surname include:

- Jay Boekelheide, American sound editor
- Todd Boekelheide (born 1954), American film composer
- Virgil Boekelheide (1919–2003), American chemist

== See also ==
- Boekelheide reaction, a chemical reaction named after Virgil Boekelheide
