= Boekelheide reaction =

Reaction in Organic Chemistry

Named after	Virgil Carl Boekelheide
Reaction type	Rearrangement reaction

The Boekelheide reaction is a rearrangement of α-picoline-N-oxides to hydroxymethylpyridines. It is named after Virgil Boekelheide who first reported it in 1954. Originally the reaction was carried out using acetic anhydride, which typically required a period at reflux (~140 °C). The reaction can be performed using trifluoroacetic anhydride (TFAA), which often allows for a room temperature reaction.

Overall reaction of the Boekelheide reaction

== Mechanism ==
The mechanism of the Boekelheide reaction begins by an acyl transfer from the trifluoroacetic anhydride to the N-oxide oxygen. The α-methyl carbon is then deprotonated by the trifluoroacetate anion. This sets the molecule up for a [3.3]-sigmatropic rearrangement which furnishes the trifluoroacetylated methylpyridine. Hydrolysis of the trifluoroacetate releases the hydroxymethylpyridine.

Mechanism of the Boekelheide reaction

== Related reactions ==
2-Chloromethylpyridine can be prepared by treating 2-picoline-N-oxide with phosphoryl chloride or triphosgene.
