= 4-Methylbenzyltrimethylammonium hydroxide =

Names
- Preferred IUPAC name N,N,N-Trimethyl-1-(4-methylphenyl)methanaminium hydroxide
- Other names p-Methylbenzyltrimethylammonium hydroxide

Identifiers
CAS Number	43011-61-6
3D model (JSmol)	Interactive image
PubChem CID	12324565
- InChI: InChI=1S/C11H18N.H2O/c1-10-5-7-11(8-6-10)9-12(2,3)4;/h5-8H,9H2,1-4H3;1H2/q+1;/p-1 Key: BHZSLQZBUUWFED-UHFFFAOYSA-M
- SMILES: [OH-].C=1C=C(C=CC1C)C[N+](C)(C)C

Properties
Chemical formula	C_{11}H_{19}NO
Molar mass	181.279 g·mol^{−1}
Boiling point	dec.

Related compounds
Related compounds	Benzyltrimethylammonium hydroxide
- Except where otherwise noted, data are given for materials in their standard state (at 25 °C [77 °F], 100 kPa). Infobox references

4-Methylbenzyltrimethylammonium hydroxide is a quaternary ammonium compound with the formula C_{11}H_{18}N^{+}OH^{−}. It can be synthesized by reacting 4-methylbenzyl bromide with triethylamine, followed by stirring with silver oxide in water.

== Reactions ==
When heated with phenothiazine in toluene, it undergoes Hofmann elimination to form [2.2]Paracyclophane.

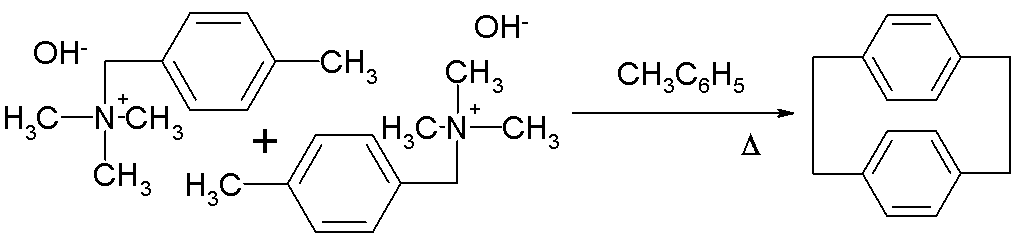

Paracycloheterophanes can be obtained by heating it with other quaternary ammonium hydroxides (e.g. with (5-methyl-2-thienylmethyl)trimethylammonium hydroxide to form [2.2]paracyclo(2,5)thiophenophane).
