= Phanephos =

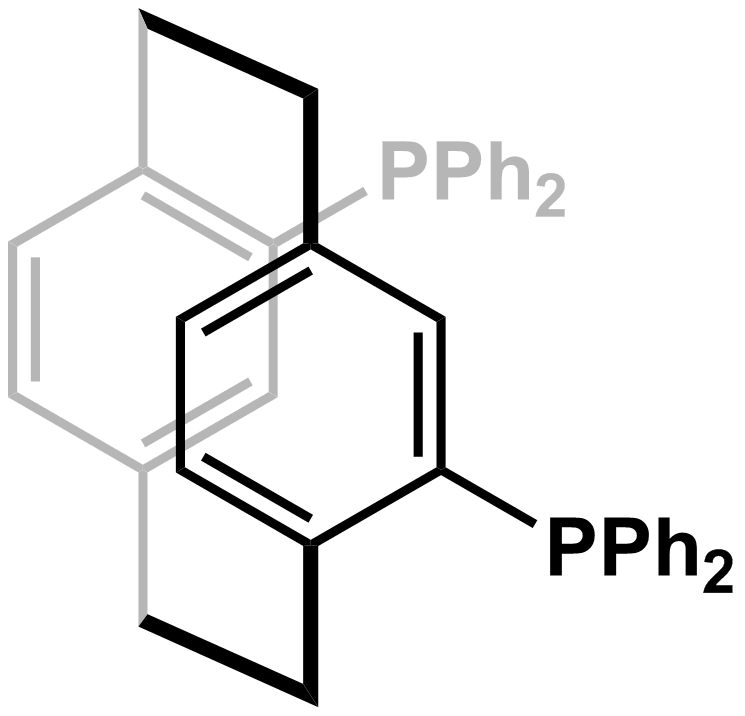

Names
- IUPAC name (S)-(+)-4,12-Bis(diphenylphosphino)-[2.2]-paracyclophane; (R)-(−)-4,12-Bis(diphenylphosphino)-[2.2]-paracyclophane
- Other names (S)-Phanephos; (R)-Phanephos

Identifiers
CAS Number	(S): 364732-88-7; (R): 192463-40-4
3D model (JSmol)	(S): Interactive image
ChemSpider	(S): 9040059
ECHA InfoCard	100.217.129
EC Number	(R): 690-034-8
PubChem CID	(S): 10864772
CompTox Dashboard (EPA)	(S): DTXSID301045593
- InChI: InChI=1S/C40H34P2/c1-5-13-35(14-6-1)41(36-15-7-2-8-16-36)39-29-31-21-25-33(39)27-23-32-22-26-34(28-24-31)40(30-32)42(37-17-9-3-10-18-37)38-19-11-4-12-20-38/h1-22,25-26,29-30H,23-24,27-28H2 Key: GYZZZILPVUYAFJ-UHFFFAOYSA-N; (S): InChI=1/C40H34P2/c1-5-13-35(14-6-1)41(36-15-7-2-8-16-36)39-29-31-21-25-33(39)27-23-32-22-26-34(28-24-31)40(30-32)42(37-17-9-3-10-18-37)38-19-11-4-12-20-38/h1-22,25-26,29-30H,23-24,27-28H2 Key: GYZZZILPVUYAFJ-UHFFFAOYAH
- SMILES: (S): C1CC2=C(C=C(CCC3=C(C=C1C=C3)P(C4=CC=CC=C4)C5=CC=CC=C5)C=C2)P(C6=CC=CC=C6)C7=CC=CC=C7

Properties
Chemical formula	C_{40}H_{34}P_{2}
Molar mass	576.660 g·mol^{−1}
Appearance	White to off-white powder or crystals
Melting point	222 to 225 °C (432 to 437 °F; 495 to 498 K)
- Except where otherwise noted, data are given for materials in their standard state (at 25 °C [77 °F], 100 kPa). Infobox references

Phanephos is an organophosphorus compound with the chemical formula (C_{2}H_{4})_{2}(C_{6}H_{3}PPh_{2})_{2} (Ph = C_{6}H_{5}). It is a white solid that is soluble in organic solvents. It is an example of a chiral C_{2}-symmetric diphosphine ligand used in asymmetric hydrogenation. Many substituents have been introduced in place of the phenyl groups, e.g., i-Pr, C_{6}H_{11}, etc. and a variety of chiral diphosphine ligands have been reported in asymmetric catalysis since the 1960s.

== Preparation ==
Phanephos can be prepared in two steps from [2.2]paracyclophane. In the first step, [2.2]paracyclophane is dibrominated to give a pseudo-para dibromide. Thermal isomerisation then gives pseudo-ortho atropisomer of the dibromide. This isomer is subjected to lithium-halogen exchange by nBuLi and the resulting dilithium compound is treated with PPh_{2}Cl to give a racemic mixture of phanephos.

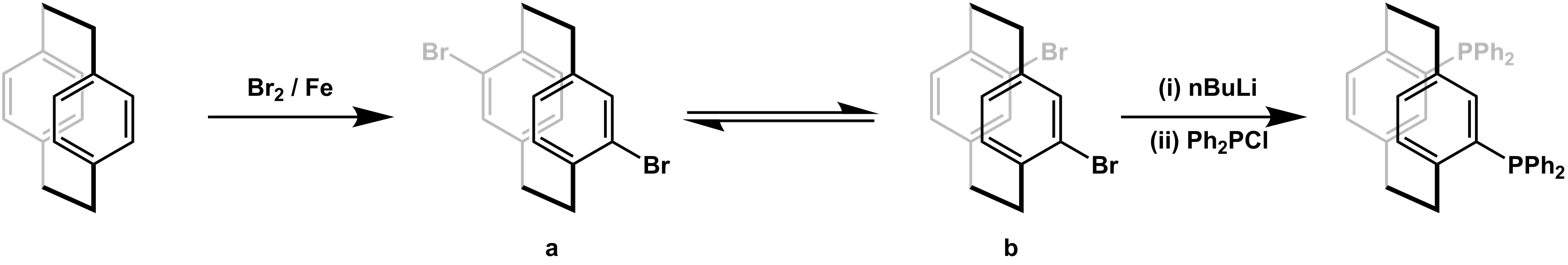
Phanephos preparation

== Uses ==
Phanephos has been used in rhodium- and ruthenium- mediated stereoselective hydrogenation of dehydro amino acid methyl esters and asymmetric reduction of various β-ketoesters with about 90% ee.
