= Xylylene =

Class of chemical compounds

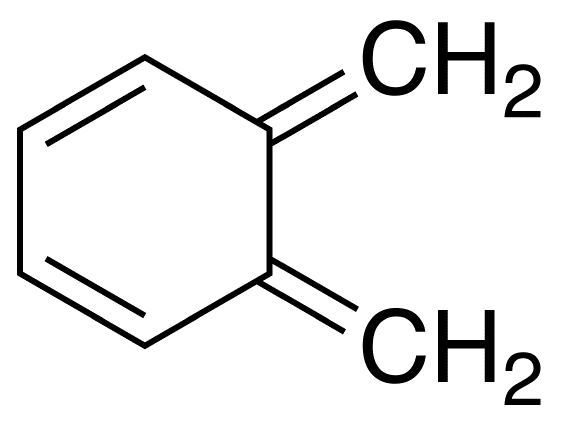
ortho-Xylylene

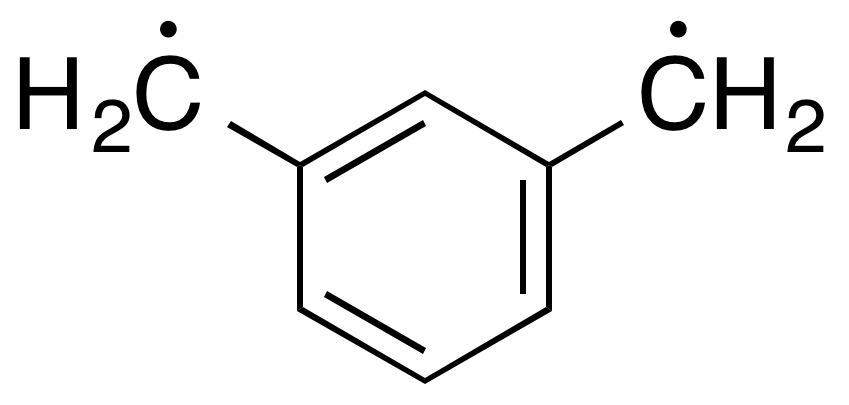
meta-Xylylene

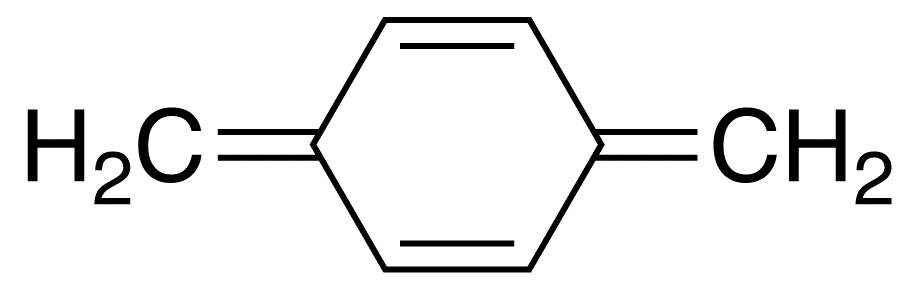
para-Xylylene

In organic chemistry, a xylylene (sometimes quinone-dimethide) is any of the constitutional isomers having the formula C_{6}H_{4}(CH_{2})_{2}. These compounds are related to the corresponding quinones and quinone methides by replacement of the oxygen atoms by CH_{2} groups. ortho- and para-xylylene are best known, although neither is stable in solid or liquid form. The meta form is a diradical. Certain substituted derivatives of xylylenes are however highly stable, such as tetracyanoquinodimethane and the xylylene dichlorides.

== p-Xylylene ==
p-Xylylene forms upon pyrolysis of p-xylene or, more readily, the α-substituted derivatives. p-Xylylene dimerizes with moderate efficiency to give p-cyclophane:

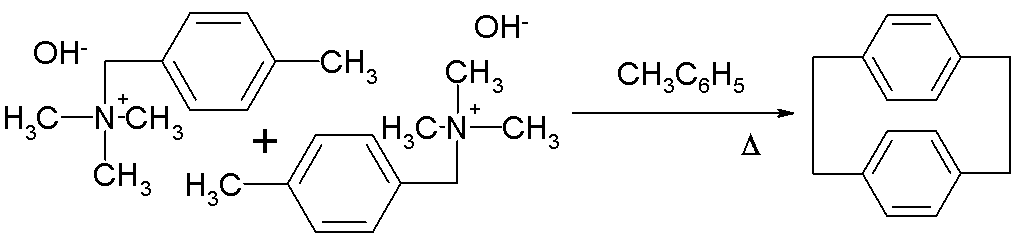
Scheme 7. 2,2-paracyclophane synthesis

Further heating of the p-cyclophane gives poly(para-xylylene).

== o-Xylylenes ==
o-Xylylenes (o-quinodimethanes) are often generated in situ, e.g., by the pyrolysis of the corresponding sulfone. Another method involves 1,4-elimination of ortho benzylic silanes. or stannanes,

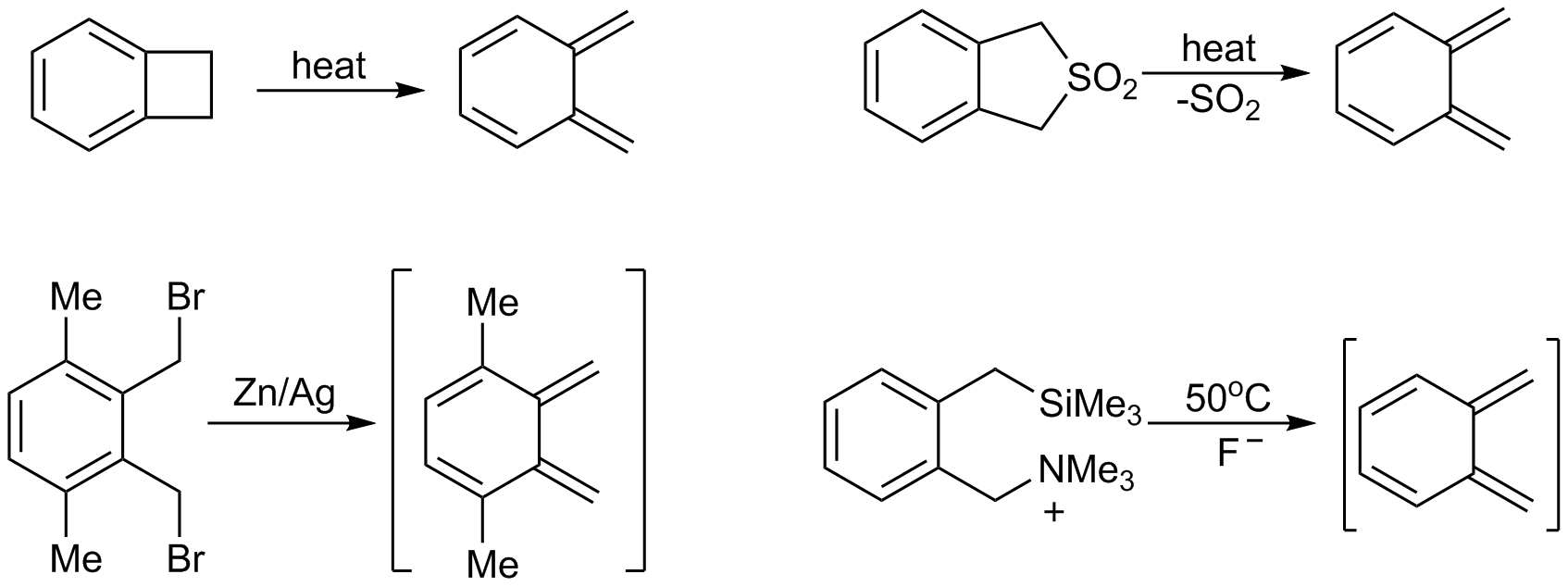
in situ generation of o-quinodomethanes

α,α'-ortho Xylene dibromides have been well developed for generating o-xylyenes. For example, reaction of tetrabromo-o-xylene (C_{6}H_{4}(CHBr_{2})_{2}) with sodium iodide affords α,α'-dibromo-o-xylylene, which can be trapped to give naphthylene derivatives. In the absence of trapping agents, the xylylene relaxes to α,α'-dibromobenzocyclobutane:

C_{6}H_{4}(CHBr_{2})_{2} + 2 NaI → C_{6}H_{4}(=CHBr)_{2} + 2 NaBr + I_{2}
C_{6}H_{4}(=CHBr)_{2} → C_{6}H_{4}(CHBr)_{2}

Cycloadditions of these o-xylylenes provides a pathway to acenes.

The diene unit formed by the two exocyclic alkene units of the ortho isomer can serve as a ligand in coordination complexes. For example, reaction of α,α'-dibromo-o-xylene with iron carbonyls affords low yields of the xylylene complex Fe(CO)_{3}[η^{4}-C_{6}H_{4}(CH_{2})_{2}]. This product is structurally analogous to Fe(CO)_{3}[η^{4}-1,3-butadiene].

At high temperatures, benzocyclobutenes undergo electrocyclic ring-opening to form o-xylylenes. This and other syntheses of o-xylylenes, and their subsequent dimerization by [4+4] cycloaddition to form cycloctyl structures, were used repeatedly in the synthesis of superphane.

== Electronic structure ==
Despite the observed chemistry of para-xylylene (i.e. its rapid polymerization to poly-p-xylylene), which suggests the compound exists as a diradical, physical evidence unanimously concludes that the lowest electronic state of p-xylylene is a closed shell singlet. Additionally, several computational methods confirm this assignment. Conversely, meta-xylylene is a non-Kekulé molecule that has a triplet ground-state.
