= Virgil Boekelheide =

American chemist

- Born: July 28, 1919; Chelsea, South Dakota
- Died: September 24, 2003 (aged 84); Eugene, Oregon
- Known for: Synthesis and characterization of cyclophanes
- Children: 3
- Scientific career
- Fields: Organic chemistry, synthetic chemistry
- Institutions: University of Rochester, University of Oregon
- Doctoral advisor: C. Frederick Koelsch
- Notable students: Victor Snieckus

Virgil Boekelheide (July 28, 1919 – September 24, 2003) was an American organic chemist and a professor in the department of chemistry at the University of Oregon. He is known for his work on aromatic compounds, particularly cyclophanes, and a name reaction, the Boekelheide reaction, is named after him.

== Education and academic career ==
Boekelheide was born in Chelsea, South Dakota to a family of German ancestry. He received his bachelor's degree from Dakota Wesleyan University in 1939. He then received his PhD from the University of Minnesota in 1943, where he worked under the supervision of C. Frederick Koelsch. After three years as an instructor at the University of Illinois Urbana-Champaign, he joined the faculty as a professor at the University of Rochester in 1946. He moved to the University of Oregon in 1960 and remained there for the rest of his research career. He retired in 1984.

Boekelheide was awarded the Guggenheim Fellowship in 1953 and was an Alexander von Humboldt Fellow, permitting him to spend time as a visiting scientist in Germany. He was elected to the National Academy of Sciences in 1962.

== Research ==
Chemical structure of superphane

Boekelheide began his research career studying alkaloid natural products, but later refocused his interests on aromaticity, particularly bridged compounds known as cyclophanes. He was the first to synthesize the sixfold-bridged cyclophane compound known as superphane, a molecule of interest due to its unique pi-stacking intramolecular interactions.

A name reaction, the Boekelheide reaction, is named after him following his publication in 1954.

== Personal life ==
Especially in later life, Boekelheide was a patron of the arts in Eugene, Oregon, serving as president of the Eugene Ballet Society from 1988 to 1991. He and his wife had three children.
