= Prothioconazole =

Names
- IUPAC name 2-[2-(1-chlorocyclopropyl)-3-(2-chlorophenyl)-2-hydroxypropyl]-1H-1,2,4-triazole-3-thione

Identifiers
CAS Number	178928-70-6
3D model (JSmol)	Interactive image
ChEBI	CHEBI:84008
ChEMBL	ChEMBL2251446
ChemSpider	4953623
ECHA InfoCard	100.114.615
EC Number	605-841-2
PubChem CID	6451142
UNII	27B9FV58IY
CompTox Dashboard (EPA)	DTXSID4034869
- InChI: InChI=1S/C14H15Cl2N3OS/c15-11-4-2-1-3-10(11)7-14(20,13(16)5-6-13)8-19-12(21)17-9-18-19/h1-4,9,20H,5-8H2,(H,17,18,21) Key: MNHVNIJQQRJYDH-UHFFFAOYSA-N
- SMILES: C1CC1(C(CC2=CC=CC=C2Cl)(CN3C(=S)N=CN3)O)Cl

Properties
Chemical formula	C_{14}H_{15}Cl_{2}N_{3}OS
Molar mass	344.2 g/mol
Appearance	white crystalline powder
Density	1.36 g/cm^{3}
Melting point	139.1–144.5 °C (282.4–292.1 °F; 412.2–417.6 K)
Boiling point	437-537°C Decomposes at 222°C
Solubility in water	300 mg/L at 20 °C
Solubility	soluble in acetone, polyethylene glycol, esters
Vapor pressure	3 × 10^{−7} mm Hg
Acidity (pK_{a})	6.9

Hazards
- GHS labelling
Pictograms	(GHS09: Environmental hazard)
Signal word	Warning
Hazard statements	H410
Precautionary statements	P273, P391, P501
- Lethal dose or concentration (LD, LC)
LD_{50} (median dose)	6200 mg/kg
LC_{50} (median concentration)	4.9 mg/L
- Except where otherwise noted, data are given for materials in their standard state (at 25 °C [77 °F], 100 kPa). verify (what is ?) Infobox references

Prothioconazole is a synthetic chemical produced primarily for its fungicidal properties. It is a member of the class of compounds triazoles, and possesses a unique toxophore in this class of fungicides. Its effective fungicidal properties can be attributed to its ability to inhibit CYP51A1. This enzyme is required to biosynthesize ergosterol, a key component in the cell membrane of fungi.

Prothioconazole was first introduced into the market in 2004 by Bayer CropScience and quickly gained popularity due to its broad spectrum of activity against many fungal diseases of important cereal crops. It is used as a solo product under the trade name Proline, and in various mixtures in many other commercially produced fungicides.

== Synthesis ==
The Grignard derivative of 2-chlorobenzyl chloride is added across the double bond of 1-chlorocyclopropyl-2-chloro-ethan-1-one. The chloride within the chloromethyl group is subsequently substituted by 1,2,4-triazole. Finally, to introduce the thioketone group at position 5 on the 1,2,4-triazole, the compound is first lithiated with n-butyllithium, followed by the addition of sulfur (S_{8}). This synthesis is not enantio-selective, resulting in a racemic mixture.

== Chemical properties ==
Prothioconazole does not dissolve well in water but can be dissolved in acetone, esters and polyethylene glycol. Photo-degeneration proceeds to completion, with the half-life of photo degeneration being 47.7h. It does not readily undergo hydrolysis, such that a pH of 4 and temperature of 50 °C results in half of the molecules being hydrolyzed after only 120 days. The primary degradation product is prothioconazole-desthio. This product possesses average mobility in the soil and its stability to hydrolysis consequently leads to its persistence in soil under aerobic conditions with total degradation in soil taking around 14.7 days. It is also highly resistant to aqueous photolysis and degradation by both aerobic and anaerobic aquatic organisms.

== Toxicology ==
=== Classification ===
Extrapolation of animal studies led to prothioconazole and its metabolites being classified as "Not likely to be Carcinogenic to Humans" by the USEPA. The GHS assessed prothioconazole and deemed it to be very toxic to aquatic life with long lasting effects (H410).

The acceptable daily intake (ADI) for prothioconazole amounts to 0.01 mg/kg body weight per day, whereas the acute reference dose (ARfD) was determined to be 0.01 mg/kg bw per day.

=== Toxicity ===
Experiments were conducted on animals where the primary route of uptake was oral administration. Coupling the compound to a radioactive label revealed enterohepatic circulation of the compound. At the LOAEL, prothioconazole and its metabolites target the liver, kidneys and the bladder. The lethal dose (LD_{50}) is 6200 mg/kg bw in rats. The dermal LD_{50} amounted to more than 2000 mg/kg bw, whereas a 4-hour inhalation LC_{50} was determined to be over 4.9 mg/L. Short term studies assessed adverse hepatic effects, an increase in liver weight, increased activity of liver enzymes and microscopic lesions. Prothioconazole was reported to be irritating to rabbit eyes but not skin. Studies have shown that elimination via the feces is the main route of excretion with over 70% excreted within 24 hours. The half-life of elimination was deduced to be 44.3 hours.

=== Metabolism in animals ===
The biotransformation of prothioconazole proceeds by either desulfuration or oxidative hydroxylation of the phenyl group and subsequent conjugation with glucuronic acid. The major metabolites maintain the triazolinthione moiety in all species investigated. The major metabolite was prothioconazole-S-glucuronide, which results from phase II reactions. A linear dose-response relationship was observed for prothioconazole-desthio residues in liver and kidney at different feeding levels.

=== Metabolism in plants ===
Prothioconazole-desthio is the major metabolite found in all plant species investigated. Prothioconazole-desthio and prothioconazole share similar toxicological properties. Studies suggest that the plant takes up 1,2,4-triazole from the soil and directly metabolizes it, as the presence of free 1,2,4-triazole was undetectable.

== Biochemical properties ==
=== Interactions ===
The primary mechanism of fungicidal action involves the inhibition of CYP51, a crucial component in the demethylation process of lanosterol or 24-methyl dihydroano-sterol at position 14. Disruption of this process results in the impaired biosynthesis mechanism of ergosterol. Ergosterol is a precursor for vitamin D_{2}, which is essential for the structure of the cell membrane in many fungal species.

Studies also suggest that prothioconazole can also interact with and temporarily suppress thyroid peroxidase. This enzyme is responsible for iodine (I_{2}) formation from iodide (I^{−}). Inhibition of this process results in decreased production of thyroid hormones in humans, such as thyroxine or triiodothyronine.
