= Pummerer rearrangement =

Reaction in organic chemistry

Named after	Rudolph Pummerer
Reaction type	Rearrangement reaction

Identifiers
RSC ontology ID	RXNO:0000220

The Pummerer rearrangement is an organic reaction whereby an alkyl sulfoxide rearranges to an α-acyloxy–thioether (monothioacetal-ester) in the presence of acetic anhydride.

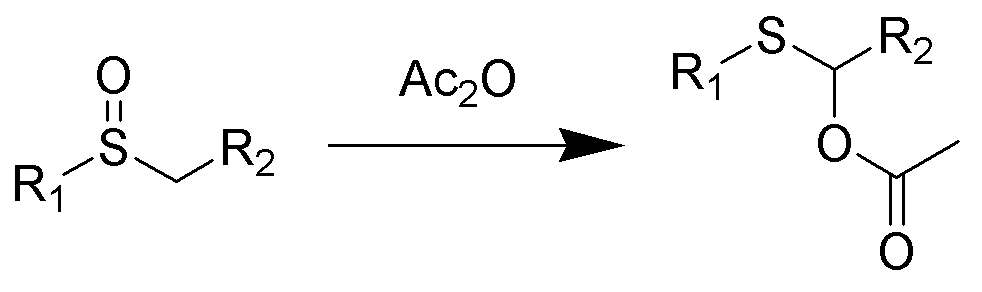
The Pummerer rearrangement

The stoichiometry of the reaction is:

RS(O)CHR'_{2} + Ac_{2}O → RSC(OAc)R'_{2} + AcOH

== Synthetic implementation ==
Aside from acetic anhydride, trifluoroacetic anhydride and trifluoromethanesulfonic anhydride have been employed as activators. Common nucleophiles besides acetates are arenes, alkenes, amides, and phenols.

Many variations of the basic Pummerer rearrangement have been described:

- additive Pummerer reactions
- domino Pummerer reaction, whereby the C-S bond is cleaved often
- asymmetric Pummerer reactions, which exploits the chirality of most sulfoxides
- interrupted Pummerer reactions

The usage of α-acyl sulfoxides and Lewis acids, such as TiCl_{4} and SnCl_{4}, allow the reaction to proceed at lower temperatures (0 °C).

Thionyl chloride can be used in place of acetic anhydride to trigger the elimination for forming the electrophilic intermediate and supplying chloride as the nucleophile to give an α-chloro-thioether:

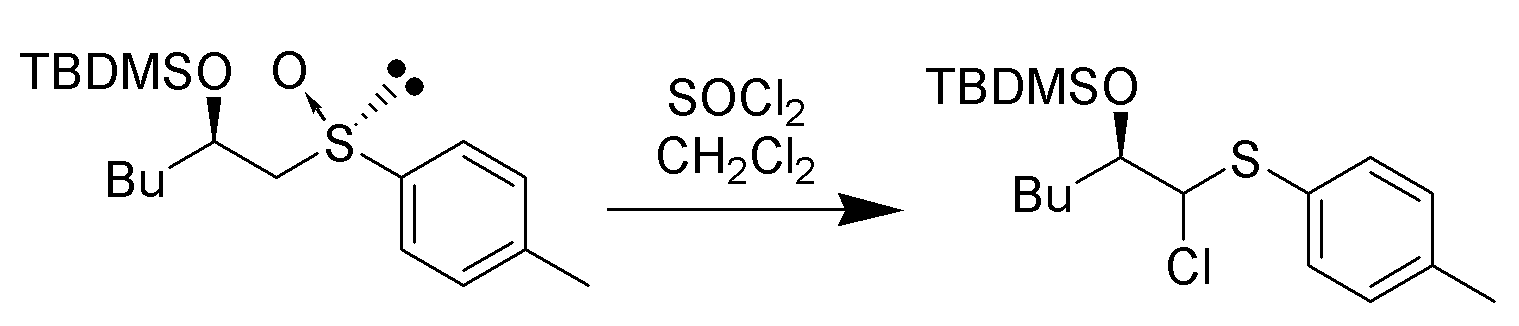
Example of the Pummerer rearrangement using thionyl chloride

Other anhydrides and acyl halides can give similar products. Inorganic acids can also give this reaction. This product can be converted to aldehyde or ketone by hydrolysis.

== Mechanism ==
The mechanism of the Pummerer rearrangement begins with the acylation of the sulfoxide (resonance structures 1 and 2) by acetic anhydride to give 3, with acetate as byproduct. The acetate then acts as a catalyst to induce an elimination reaction to produce the cationic-thial structure 4, with acetic acid as byproduct. Finally, acetate attacks the thial to give the final product 5.

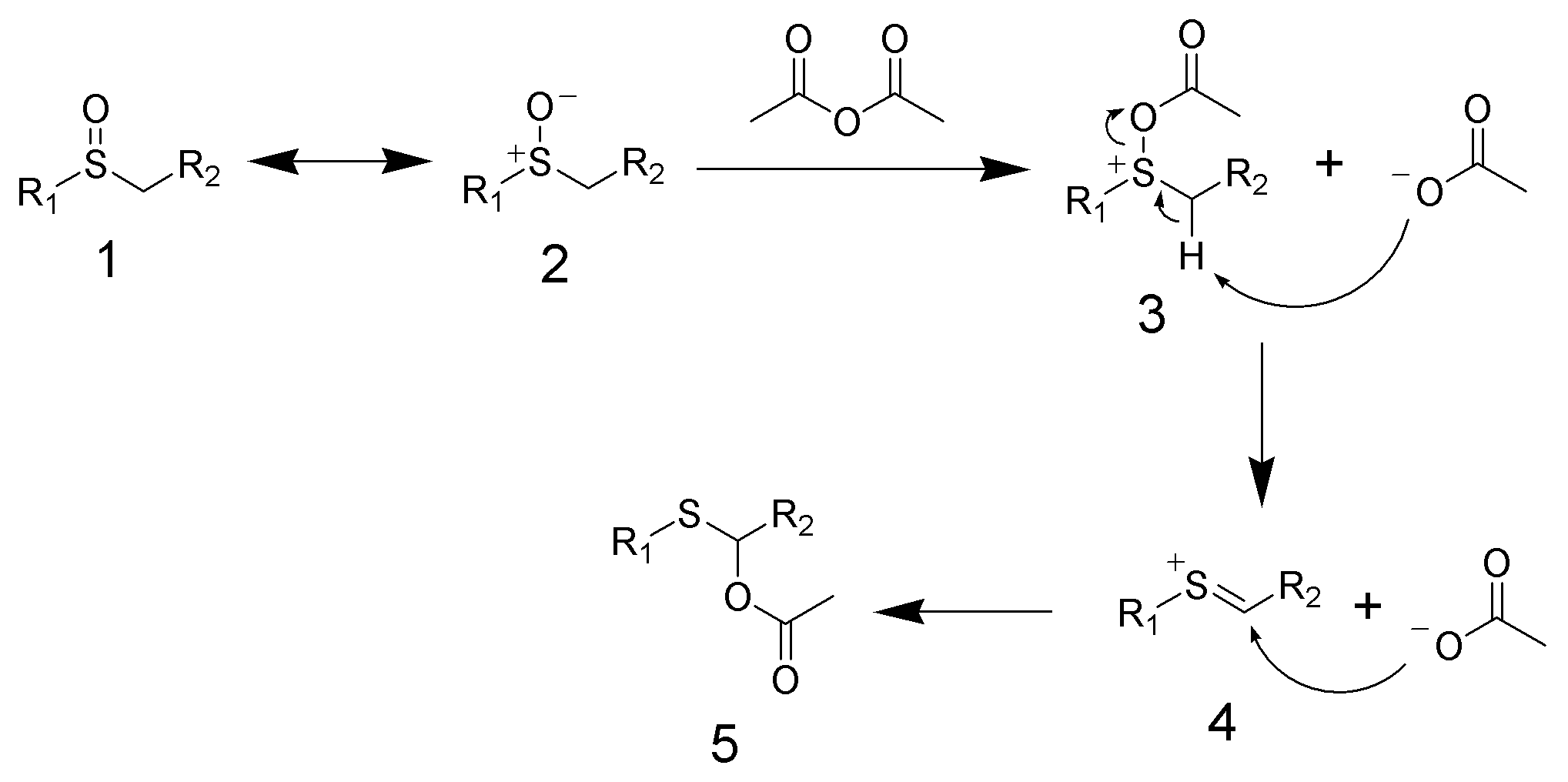
The mechanism of the Pummerer rearrangement

The activated thial electrophile can be trapped by various intramolecular and intermolecular nucleophiles to form carbon–carbon bonds and carbon–heteroatom bonds.

The intermediate is so electrophilic that even neutral nucleophiles can be used, including aromatic rings with electron donating groups such as 1,3-benzodioxole:

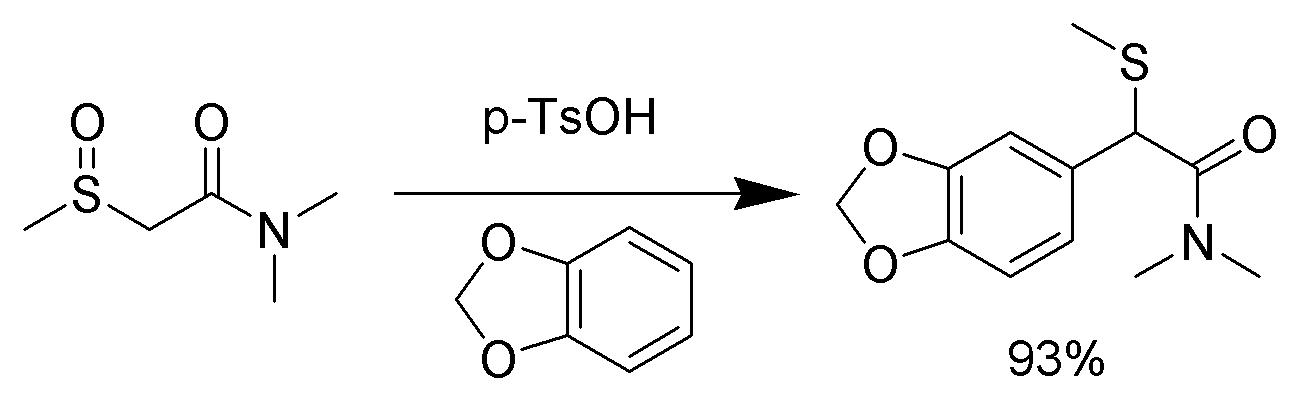
Example of the Pummerer rearrangement using veratrole

It is possible to perform the rearrangement using selenium in the place of sulfur.

=== Pummerer fragmentation ===
When a substituent on the α position can form a stable carbocation, this group rather than the α-hydrogen atom will eliminate in the intermediate step. This variation is called a Pummerer fragmentation. This reaction type is demonstrated below with a set of sulfoxides and trifluoroacetic anhydride (TFAA):

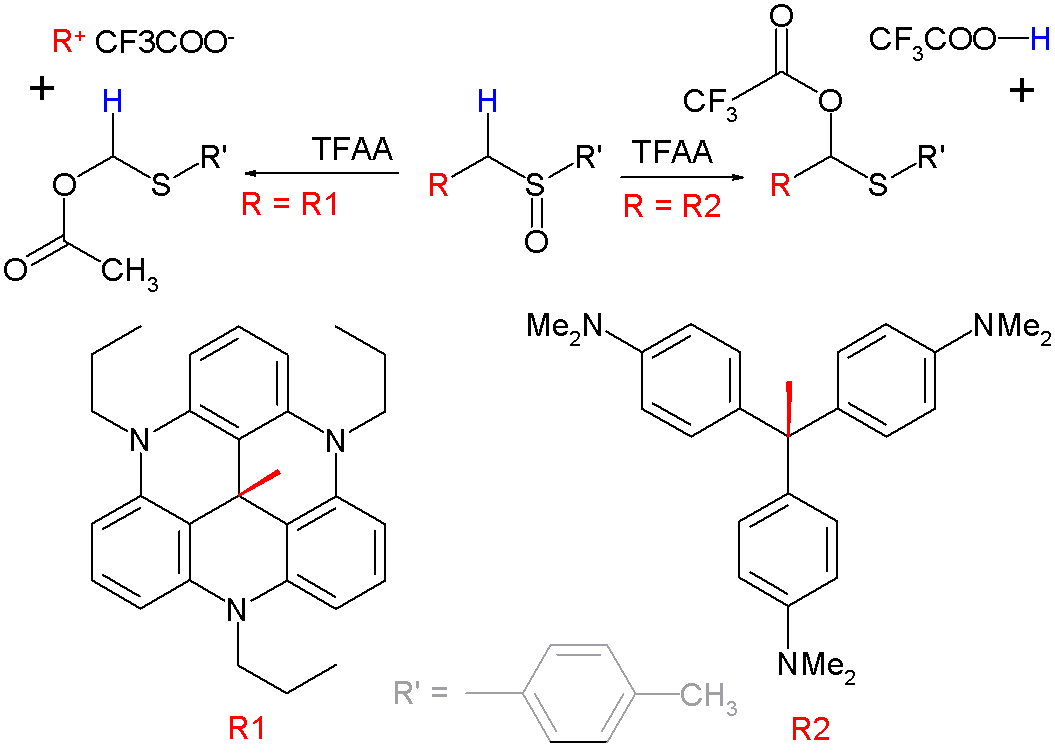
Pummerer fragmentation

The organic group "R2" shown in the diagram above on the bottom right is the methyl violet carbocation, whose pK_{R+} of 9.4 is not sufficient to out-compete loss of H^{+} and therefore a classical Pummerer rearrangement occurs. The reaction on the left is a fragmentation because the leaving group with pK_{R+} = 23.7 is particularly stable.

== History ==
The reaction was discovered by Rudolf Pummerer, who reported it in 1909.

== See also ==
- Organosulfur chemistry
- Polonovski reaction ― similar reaction involving an amine oxide
- Boekelheide reaction ― similar reaction involving a pyridine oxide
- Stevens rearrangement ― similar reaction involving sulfonium or ammonium salts, more generally
