= Cynthia Burrows =

American chemist

Cynthia Jane Burrows
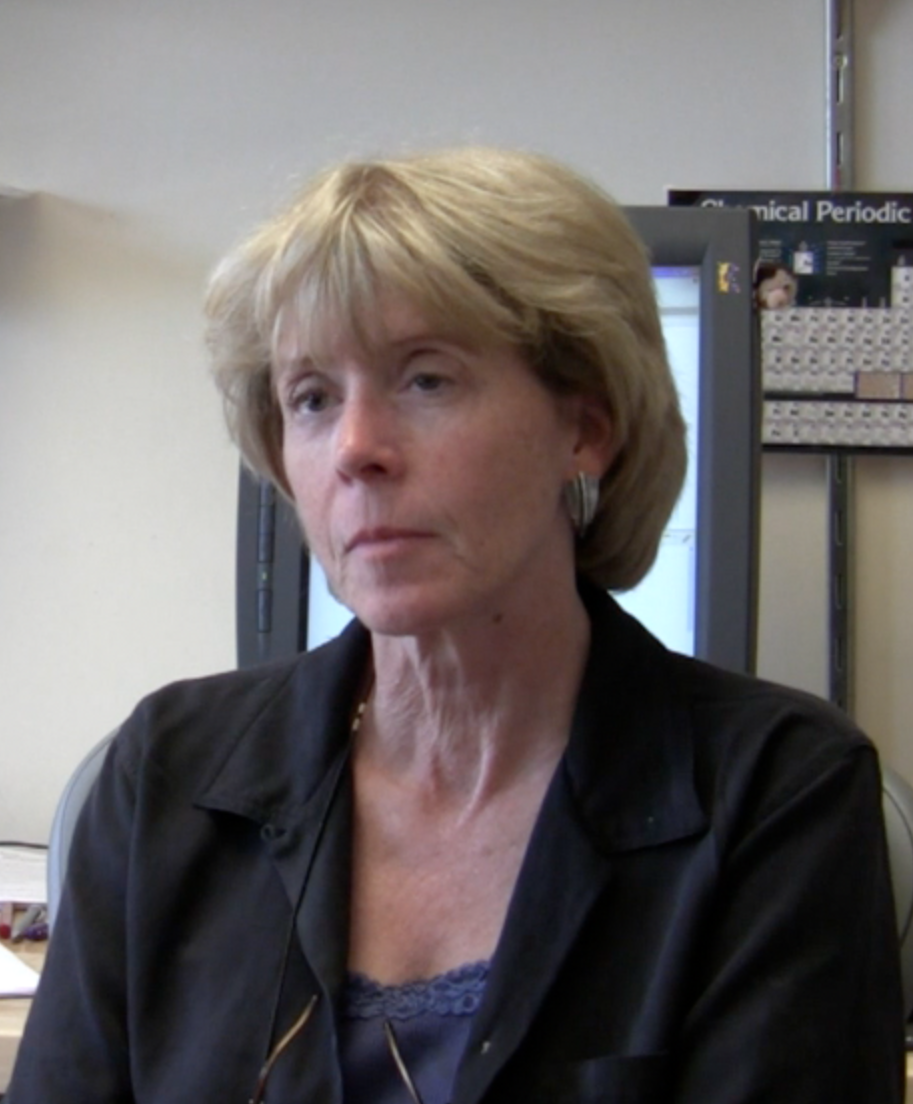
- Cynthia Burrows interviewed by the Chemical Heritage Foundation in July 2009.
- Education: University of Colorado Boulder B.A. (1975); Cornell University Ph.D. (1982)
- Scientific career
- Thesis: Substituent Effects on the Aliphatic Claisen Rearrangement: Synthesis and Kinetic Studies of Cyano-Substituted Allyl Vinyl Ethers (1982)
- Doctoral advisor: Barry Carpenter
- Other academic advisors: Stanley J. Cristol, Jean-Marie Lehn

Cynthia J. Burrows is an American chemist, currently a distinguished professor in the department of chemistry at the University of Utah, where she is also the Thatcher Presidential Endowed Chair of Biological Chemistry. Burrows was the Senior Editor of the Journal of Organic Chemistry (2001-2013) and became Editor-in-Chief of Accounts of Chemical Research in 2014.^{,}^{,}

== Education and training ==
Burrows acquired a B.A. degree in chemistry at the University of Colorado Boulder (1975). There she worked on Stern-Volmer plots in Stanley J. Cristol's laboratory during her senior year. She continued to study physical organic chemistry at Cornell University, where she received a Ph.D. degree in chemistry in 1982 working in Barry Carpenter's laboratory. Her Ph.D. thesis work focused on cyano-substituted allyl vinyl ethers. Burrows then conducted a short post-doctoral research stint with Jean-Marie Lehn in Strasbourg, France.

== Career and research ==
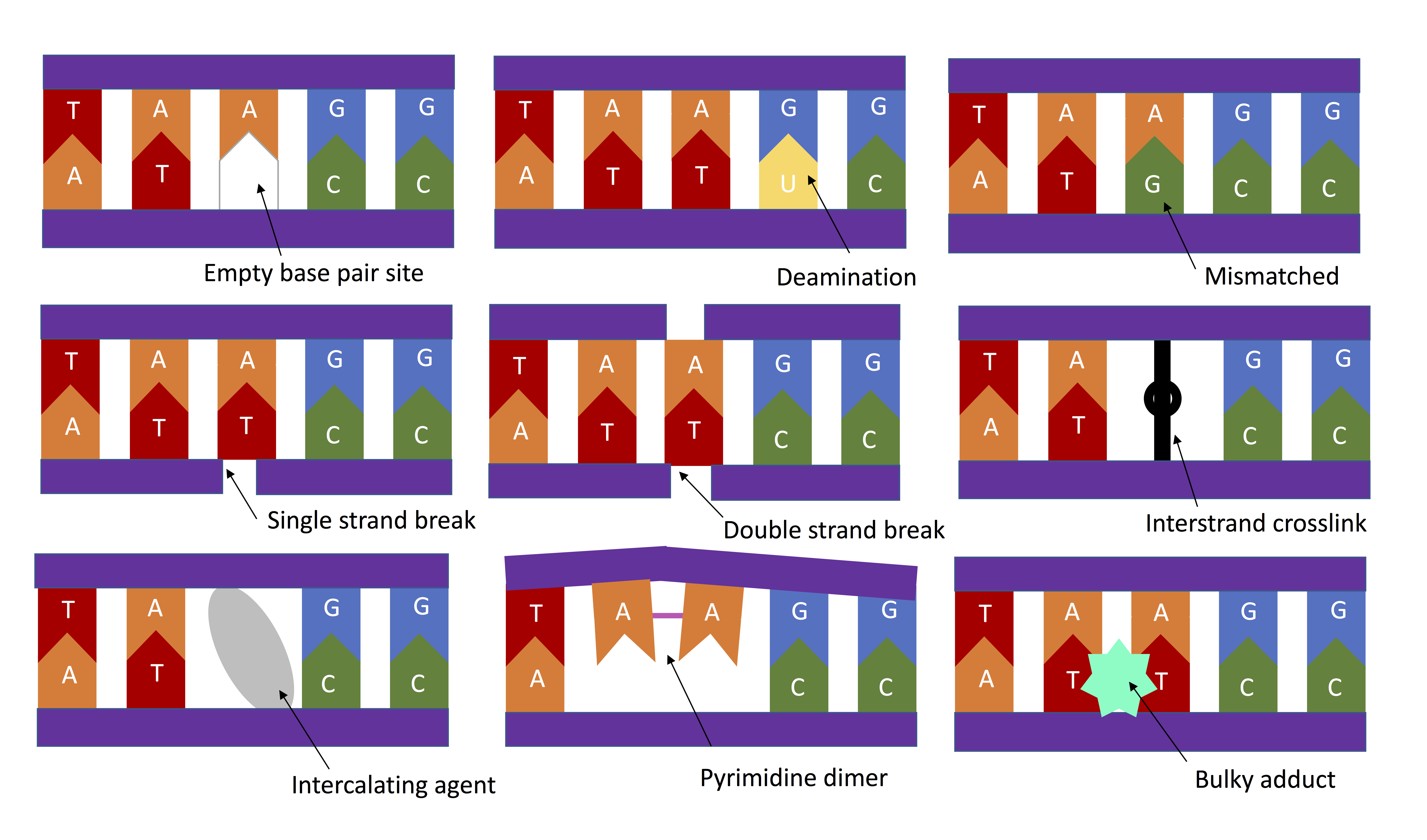
DNA can be damaged by the disruption of base pairs.

The Burrows laboratory is interested in nucleic acid chemistry, DNA sequencing technology, and DNA damage. Her research team (consisting of organic, biological, analytical and inorganic chemists) focuses on chemical processes that result in the formation of mutations, which could lead to diseases (such as cancer). Her work includes studying site-specifically modified DNA and RNA strands and DNA-protein cross linking. Burrows and her group are widely known for expanding the studies on nanopore technology by developing a method for detecting DNA damage using a nanopore.^{,}

One of the objectives of the Burrows Laboratory is to apply nanopore technology to identify, quantify, and analyze DNA damage brought on by oxidative stresses. Burrows focuses on the damage found in human telomeric sequences, crucial chromosomal regions that provide protection from degradation and are subject to problems during DNA replication. Additionally, Burrows’ research in altering nucleic acid composition can provide valuable information in genetic diseases as well as manipulating the function of DNA and RNA in cells.

=== Nanopore detection of DNA damage ===
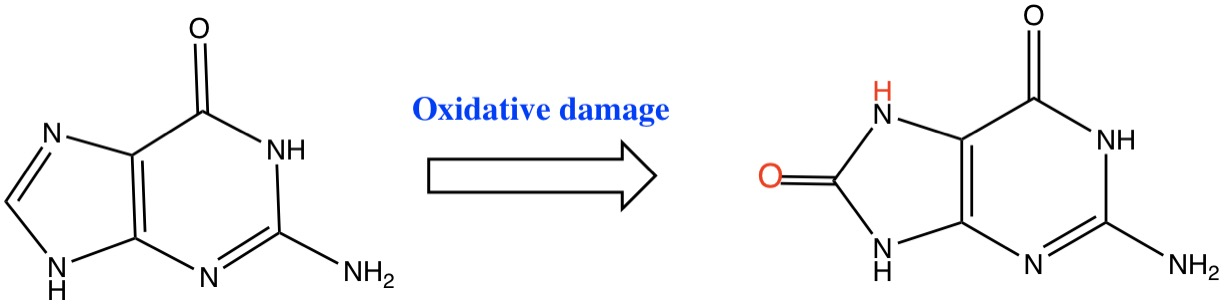
The Burrows research lab focuses on detecting guanine oxidation reaction as shown.

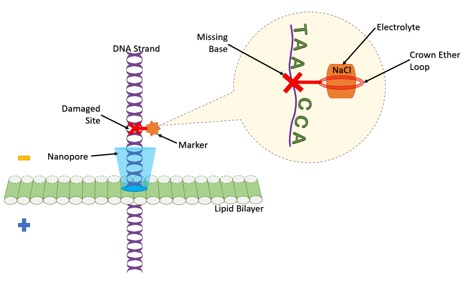
DNA strand passes through the a-hemolysin nanopore and allows researchers to detect single base damaged site. The goal of this nanopore detection system is to locate damaged sites and understand how a damage at a specific site leads to disease.

Nanopore technology is significant in analysis of biological macromolecules such as DNA and RNA because it can detect minute sample quantities and bypasses the need for PCR amplification. PCR amplification and other DNA sequencing methods cannot detect DNA damage alone because their basis relies on the four classical unmodified bases: cytosine, adenine, guanine, and thymine. One of the most common and prevalent causes of DNA damage is oxidation of guanine residues to 8-oxoguanine brought on through oxidative stresses. 8-oxoguanine causes mismatch pairing with adenine as opposed to cytosine, which can ultimately cause point mutations during DNA replication. In the context of DNA-protein cross linking, 8-oxoguanine is susceptible to forming adducts with amino acids containing reactive groups such as the phenol moiety of tyrosine or terminal amine of lysine.^{,} Detection and quantification of 8-oxoguanine content in telomeric sequences is important because content increases with stress since telomeres escape cellular DNA repair mechanisms. Burrows helped to discover specific DNA glycosylases that preferentially repaired oxidative damages at telomeric sites.

Nanopore technology relies on passing a constant electric current through a nanoscale hole immersed in an electrolytic solution. Molecules that pass through or disrupt the current by blocking the pore will generate a detectable signal when measuring current versus time. Nanopores can range from solid-state constructs to small proteins. To examine the extent of damage in G-quadruplexes of telomeres, Burrows used a protein α-hemolysin, which contains a nanoscale tube core and is embedded in the cell membrane. Damaged bases are oxidatively marked with a crown ether to amplify the current signal as well as to reduce the mitigating effects of 8-oxoguanine on the native fold. As the DNA strand passes through, the marked damaged base produces a characteristic signal as it disrupts the applied current.

== Awards and honors ==
Awards and honors include:

- National Science Foundation - Centre National de la Recherche Scientifique (NSF - CNRS) Exchange of Scientists Fellowship, 1981–82
- Japan Society for the Promotion of Science Research Fellow, 1989–90
- National Science Foundation Creativity Award, 1993–95
- National Science Foundation Career Advancement Award, 1993–94
- Bioorganic & Natural Products Study Section, National Institutes of Health, 1990–94
- National Science Foundation Math & Physical Sciences Advisory Committee, 2005–08
- Associate Editor, Organic Letters, 1999–2002
- Senior Editor, Journal of Organic Chemistry, 2001–13
- Robert W. Parry Teaching Award, 2002
- American Chemical Society Utah Award, 2000
- Bea Singer Award, 2004
- Fellow, American Association for the Advancement of Science, 2004
- Distinguished Scholarly and Creative Research Award, University of Utah, 2005
- Cope Scholar Award, American Chemical Society, 2008
- Director, Utah Science, Technology and Research Governing Authority, 2009-2017
- Member, American Academy of Arts and Sciences, 2009
- American Chemical Society Fellow, 2010
- Distinguished Teaching Award, 2011
- Editor-in-Chief, Accounts of Chemical Research, 2014
- Linda K. Amos Award for Distinguished Service to Women of University of Utah, 2014
- Member, National Academy of Science, 2014
- American Chemical Society James Flack Norris Award in Physical Organic Chemistry, 2018
- Willard Gibbs Award, 2018
- Michael J. Gait Award, UK Nucleic Acids Group, 2026
