= Xylyl bromide =

Group of chemicals used in warfare

From left to right, the ortho-, meta-, and para-isomers of xylyl bromide

Xylyl-bromide, also known as methylbenzyl bromide or T-stoff ('substance-T'), is any member or a mixture of organic chemical compounds with the molecular formula C_{6}H_{4}(CH_{3})(CH_{2}Br). The mixture was formerly used as a tear gas and has an odor reminiscent of lilac. All members and the mixture are colourless liquids, although commercial or older samples appear yellowish.

== Use as a weapon ==
Xylyl bromide is an irritant and lachrymatory agent. It has been incorporated in chemical weapons since the early months of World War I. Some commentators say the first use was in August 1914, when the French attacked German soldiers with tear gas grenades, but the agent used in that incident was more likely to be ethyl bromoacetate, which the French had tested before the war.

The first extensive use of xylyl bromide was the firing by German forces of 18,000 "T-shells" at Russian positions in the Battle of Bolimów in January 1915. The shells were modified 15 cm (6 inch) artillery shells containing an explosive charge and c. 3 kg (7 lb) xylyl bromide. The attack was a complete failure because the winter weather was too cold to permit an effective aerosol, and the agent was either blown back towards the German lines, fell harmlessly to the ground, or was insufficiently concentrated to cause damage. A similar attack at Nieuwpoort in March 1915 was also unsuccessful. Nevertheless, because of its ease of manufacture xylyl bromide was widely used in World War I, in particular as a component of the Germans' Weisskreuz (white cross) mixture.

== Structural isomers ==
Three isomers, collectively referred to by CAS registry number 35884-77-6, are:

- CAS RN 89-92-9: o-xylyl bromide (2-methylbenzyl bromide, systematic name 1-(bromomethyl)-2-methylbenzene)
- CAS RN 620-13-3: m-xylyl bromide (3-methylbenzyl bromide, systematic name 1-(bromomethyl)-3-methylbenzene)
- CAS RN 104-81-4: p-xylyl bromide (4-methylbenzyl bromide, systematic name 1-(bromomethyl)-4-methylbenzene)

In the absence of clarification, the name "xylyl bromide" may refer to any one of these isomers or a mixture of all three.

== See also ==
- Chemical weapons in World War I
- Tetrabromo-o-xylene
