= Phanes (organic chemistry) =

Phanes are abstractions of highly complex organic molecules introduced for simplification of the naming of these highly complex molecules.

Systematic nomenclature of organic chemistry consists of building a name for the structure of an organic compound by a collection of names of its composite parts but describing also its relative positions within the structure. Naming information is summarised by IUPAC:

"Phane nomenclature is a new method for building names for organic structures by assembling names that describe component parts of a complex structure. It is based on the idea that a relatively simple skeleton for a parent hydride can be modified by an operation called 'amplification', a process that replaces one or more special atoms (superatoms) of a simplified skeleton by multiatomic structures".

Whilst the cyclophane name describes only a limited number of sub-structures of benzene rings interconnected by individual atoms or chains, 'phane' is a class name which includes others, hence heterocyclic rings as well. Therefore, the various cyclophanes are perfectly good for the general class of phanes as well keeping in mind that the cyclic structures in phanes could have much greater diversity.

== Examples ==
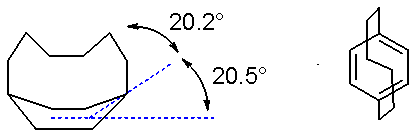
1(1,3)-benzenacycloheptaphane

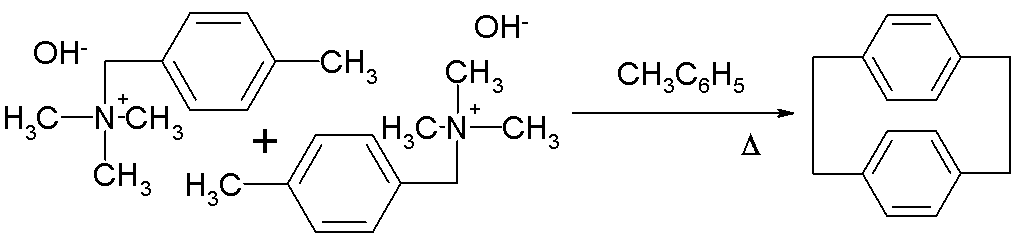
1,4(1,4)-dibenzenacyclohexaphane (right hand side)
