= Victor Snieckus =

Canadian chemist (1937–2020)

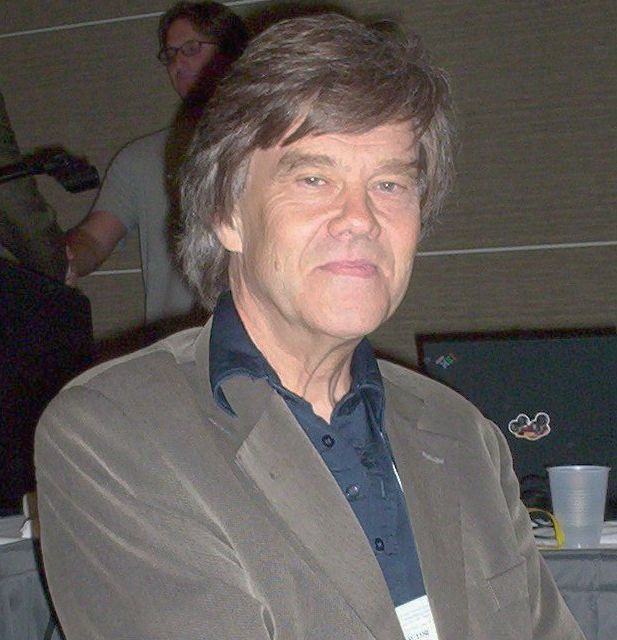
- Snieckus at an American Chemical Society meeting, 2007
- Born: August 1, 1937; Kaunas, Lithuania
- Died: December 18, 2020 (aged 83); Kawartha Lakes, Canada
- Known for: Directed ortho metalation reactions
- Scientific career
- Fields: Organic chemistry, synthetic chemistry
- Workplaces: University of Waterloo, Queen's University at Kingston

Victor Snieckus (August 1, 1937 – December 18, 2020) was a Lithuanian-born Canadian chemist. He was professor emeritus at Queen's University. Specializing in organic synthesis, he was known for his influential research on directed ortho metalation.

== Early life and education ==
Snieckus was born on August 1, 1937, in Kaunas. During World War II, his family fled to Germany, and in 1948, immigrated to Alberta, Canada. Snieckus received his bachelor's degree in chemistry from University of Alberta in 1959, his master's degree from University of California, Berkeley in 1961, and his PhD from the University of Oregon in 1965 under the supervision of Virgil Boekelheide. He spent a year as a postdoctoral scholar at the National Research Council of Canada.

== Academic career ==
In 1967, Snieckus joined the faculty of the University of Waterloo as an assistant professor, becoming an associate professor in 1971 and a full professor in 1979. He assumed the Monsanto/NRC research chair in 1992.

Snieckus relocated to Queen's University in 1998, where he assumed the Bader Chair of Chemistry. He retired and became professor emeritus in 2009. He founded a company, Snieckus Innovations, the same year, originally funded by Alfred Bader. Throughout his career Snieckus consulted for the pharmaceutical and agricultural industries.

Among other awards, Snieckus became a Fellow of the Royal Society of Canada in 1993, a Fellow of the Lithuanian Academy of Sciences in 1999, and a Fellow of the American Chemical Society in 2009.

Snieckus served as an editor for a variety of academic journals, was the president of the International Society of Heterocyclic Chemistry in 1985, and chaired the American Chemical Society's Organic Division in 1989–90. He co-organized an academic conference series, Balticum Organicum Syntheticum, a chemistry conference held in the Baltic States.

== Research ==
Snieckus' research interests in organic synthesis focused on metalation and particularly lithiation. He is best known for his work on the directed ortho metalation family of reactions. His work has had practical applications in both academic and industrial settings, particularly in the industrial-scale synthesis of pharmaceuticals and in an agricultural antifungal.
