= Superphane =

- Stereo, Kekulé, skeletal formula of superphane

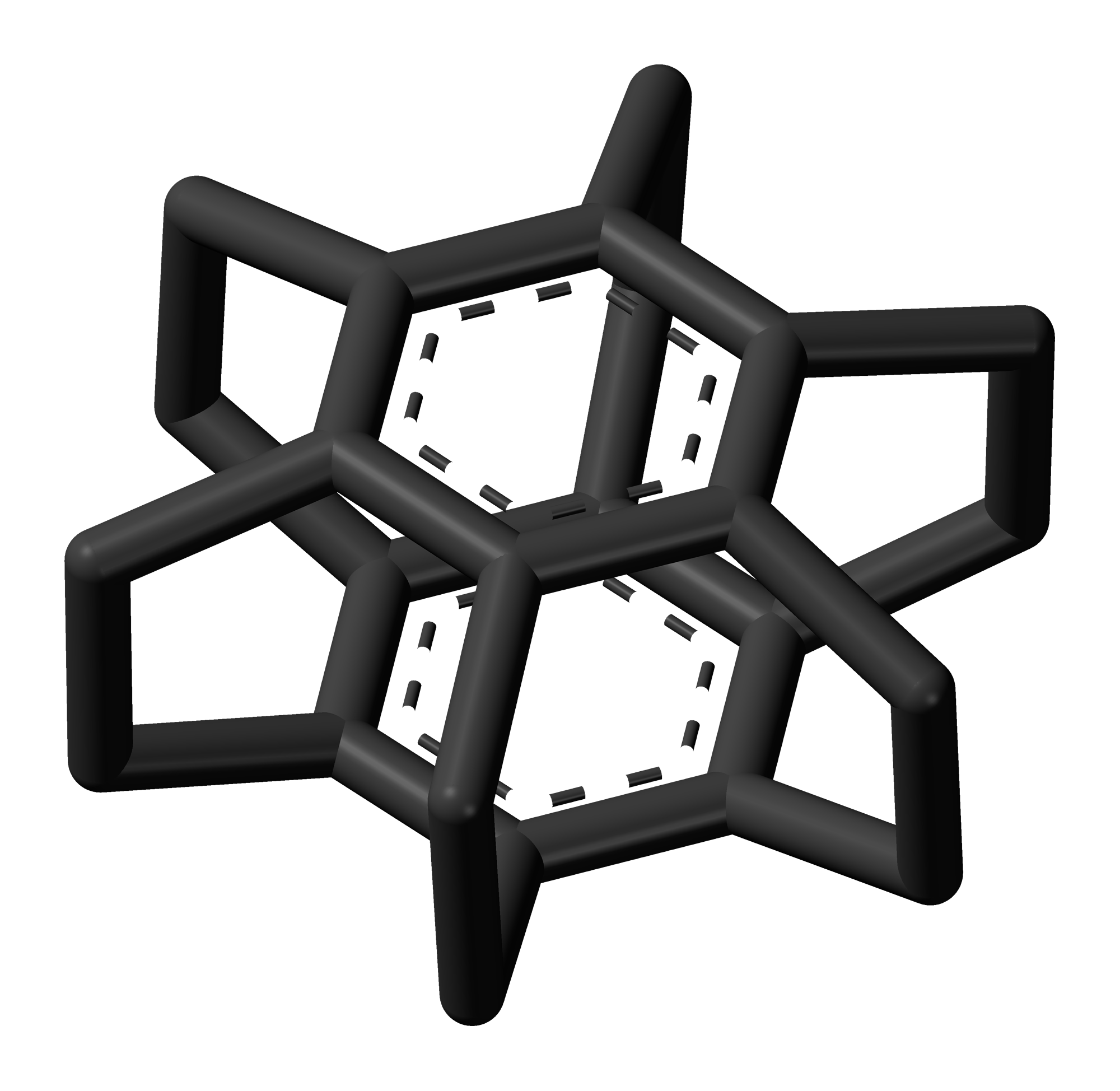
Skeletal stick model of superphane
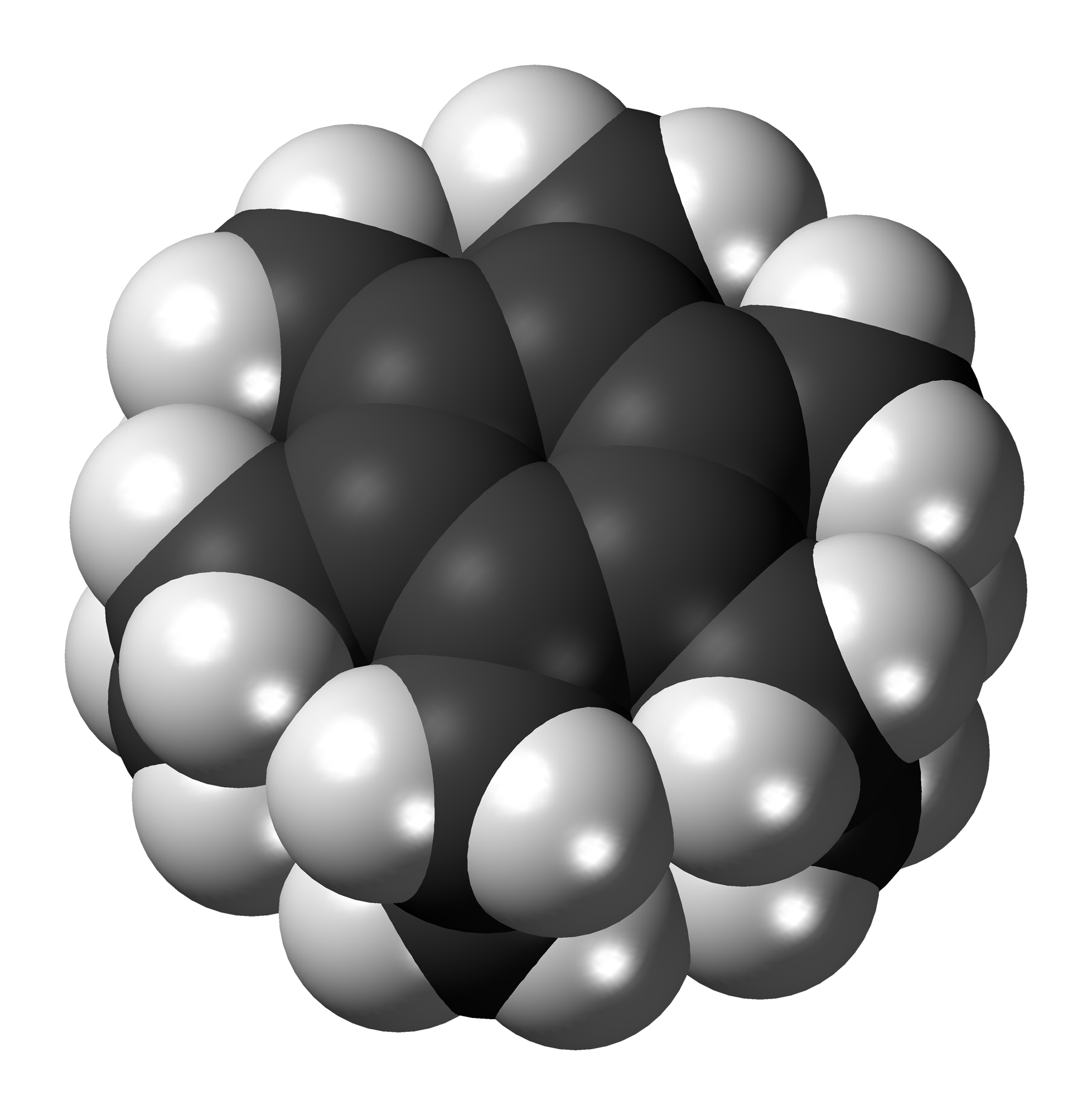
Spacefill model of superphane

Names
- Other names [2.2.2.2.2.2](1,2,3,4,5,6)Cyclophane

Identifiers
CAS Number	60144-50-5
3D model (JSmol)	Interactive image
ChemSpider	126757
PubChem CID	143678
CompTox Dashboard (EPA)	DTXSID00208882
- InChI: InChI=1S/C24H24/c1-2-14-17-5-3-15-13(1)16-4-6-18(14)22-10-8-20(16)23-11-12-24(22)21(17)9-7-19(15)23/h1-12H2 Key: BVTYOCKAKQQPEE-UHFFFAOYSA-N
- SMILES: C1Cc2c3CCc4c1c1CCc2c2CCc1c1CCc2c3CCc41

Properties
Chemical formula	C_{24}H_{24}
Molar mass	312.456 g·mol^{−1}
- Except where otherwise noted, data are given for materials in their standard state (at 25 °C [77 °F], 100 kPa). Infobox references

Superphane is a 6-fold bridged cyclophane with all arene positions in the benzene dimer taken up by ethylene spacers. The compound has been of some scientific interest as a model for testing aromaticity and was first synthesised by Virgil Boekelheide in 1979. Superphane is the base compound for a large group of derivatives with structural variations. The analogs with 2 to 5 bridges are also known compounds. The benzene rings have been replaced by other aromatic units, such as those based on ferrocene or stabilized cyclobutadiene. Numerous derivatives are known with variations in the type and length of the bridging units.

== Synthesis ==
The first synthesis of superphane itself by Boekelheide involved forming pairs of bridging units. At each stage, two o-chloromethyl toluene structures are pyrolyzed to form o-xylylenes, either directly or via benzocyclobutene intermediates. Upon further pyrolysis, these each undergo electrocyclic ring-opening to form o-xylylenes. These structures were not isolated—they immediately react via [4+4] cycloaddition reactions to form two adjacent bridges between the aromatic rings.

The process started from 2,4,5-trimethylbenzyl chloride 1, which was pyrolyzed at 700 °C to give benzocyclobutene 2 and further pyrolyzed to the cyclooctane dimer 3. Rieche formylation afforded 4 (after separation from other regioisomers), aldehyde reduction using sodium borohydride gave diol 5, and then chlorination using thionyl chloride) gave dichloride 6. Another pyrolysis gave tetrabridged cyclophane 7, another formylation reaction gave dialdehyde 8, another reduction/chlorination sequence gave dichloride 9, and a final pyrolysis gave superphane 10 as hard white crystals with melting point 325–327 °C.

Other synthetic routes were published by Hopf (1983) and another by Boekelheide (1984).

== Structure and properties ==
X-ray analysis shows D_{6h} molecular symmetry with the aromatic planes separated by 262 pm. The sp^{2}-sp^{3} carbon carbon bonds are out of planarity with the benzene rings by 20°. The strain energy is estimated at 20 kcal/mole. Proton NMR shows just one peak at 2,98 ppm and carbon NMR two at 32 ppm and 144 ppm.
