= In-Methylcyclophane =

Class of chemical compounds

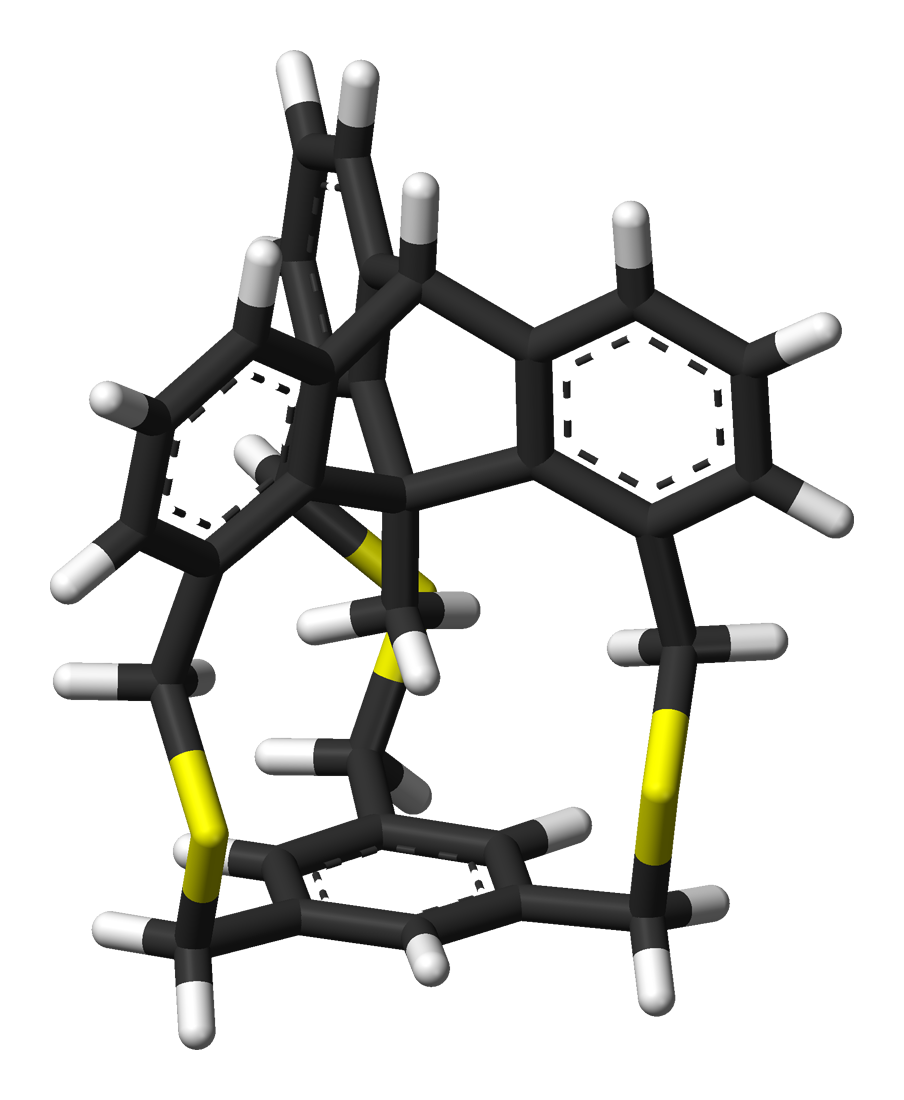
An example of the structure of an in-methylcyclophane

In-Methylcyclophanes are organic compounds and members of a larger family of cyclophanes. These compounds are used to study how chemical bonds in molecules adapt to strain. In-methylcyclophanes in particular have a methyl group in proximity to a benzene ring. This is only possible when both methyl group and ring are attached to the same rigid scaffold. In one In-methylcyclophane molecule this is accomplished with a triptycene frame.

This particular compound is synthesed starting from anthracene with a methyl group added to each arene ring (1,8,9-trimethylanthracene). A triptycene compound is formed from a reaction of this anthracene compound with an aryne in a Diels-Alder reaction in isoamyl nitrite. In this synthesis the precursor to the reactive aryne is 2-amino-6-methylbenzoic acid. Next the methyl substituents are functionalized with bromine groups by the photochemical reaction with N-bromosuccinimide or NBS. The final cyclophane is put together by reaction with 1,3,5-tris(mercaptomethyl)benzene with nucleophilic sulfhydryl groups and electrophilic alkyl bromides in a nucleophilic aliphatic Substitution.

X-ray crystallography of the tri-sulfone derivative of this cyclophane shows that the methyl group located 289.6 picometers from the center of the benzene ring. The carbon-to-carbon bond linking the methyl group to the triptycene frame is actually shortened and measures 147.5 to 149.5 pm. The similar bond in the triptycene precursor is 154 pm. Proton NMR analysis shows a chemical shift of 2.52 ppm for the methyl protons compared to that of 3.16 to 3.85 in the anthracene compound. The reason for this anomaly is that the methyl protons are in line with the aromatic ring current of the benzene ring and are therefore severely shielded, an effect similar to the nucleus-independent chemical shift method of analyzing aromaticity.
