= Benzyltriethylammonium hydroxide =

Names
- IUPAC name N-Benzyl-N,N-diethylethanaminium hydroxide

Identifiers
CAS Number	1836-42-6
3D model (JSmol)	Interactive image
ChemSpider	67178
ECHA InfoCard	100.015.821
PubChem CID	74601
CompTox Dashboard (EPA)	DTXSID60171447
- InChI: InChI=1S/C13H22N.H2O/c1-4-14(5-2,6-3)12-13-10-8-7-9-11-13;/h7-11H,4-6,12H2,1-3H3;1H2/q+1;/p-1 Key: FKPSBYZGRQJIMO-UHFFFAOYSA-M
- SMILES: CC[N+](CC)(CC)Cc1ccccc1.[OH-]

Properties
Chemical formula	C_{13}H_{23}NO
Molar mass	209.333 g·mol^{−1}
- Except where otherwise noted, data are given for materials in their standard state (at 25 °C [77 °F], 100 kPa). Infobox references

Benzyltriethylammonium hydroxide is a quaternary ammonium salt that functions as a strong base.

== Uses ==
Together with benzyltrimethylammonium hydroxide, salts of benzyltriethylammonium are common phase-transfer catalysts.
