= Accounts of Chemical Research =

Academic journal on chemistry

- Discipline: Chemistry, biochemistry
- Language: English
- Edited by: Cynthia J. Burrows

Publication details
- History: 1968–present
- Publisher: American Chemical Society (United States)
- Frequency: Semi-monthly
- Impact factor: 16.4 (2023)

Standard abbreviations
- ISO 4: Acc. Chem. Res.

Indexing
- CODEN: ACHRE4
- ISSN: 0001-4842 (print); 1520-4898 (web)
- LCCN: 70008300
- OCLC no.: 475052789

Links
- Journal homepage; Online access; Online archive

Accounts of Chemical Research is a semi-monthly peer-reviewed scientific journal published by the American Chemical Society containing overviews of basic research and applications in chemistry and biochemistry. It was established in 1968 and the editor-in-chief is Cynthia J. Burrows (University of Utah).

== Abstracting and indexing ==
The journal is abstracted and indexed in:

- Chemical Abstracts Service
- CAB International
- Current Contents/Life Sciences
- Current Contents/Physical, Chemical & Earth Sciences
- EBSCO databases
- ProQuest databases
- PubMed
- Scopus
- Science Citation Index Expanded

According to the Journal Citation Reports, the journal has a 2023 impact factor of 16.4.
