= Cyclophane =

Ring molecule with two nonadjacent atoms linked by a chain

Structures of some fundamental cyclophanes: [n]-paracyclophanes (left), [n]-metacyclophanes, and [n.n]paracyclophanes (right).

In organic chemistry, a cyclophane is a hydrocarbon consisting of an aromatic unit (typically a benzene ring) and a chain that forms a bridge between two non-adjacent positions of the aromatic ring. More complex derivatives with multiple aromatic units and bridges forming cagelike structures are also known. Cyclophanes are well-studied examples of strained organic compounds.

== [n]-Cyclophanes ==
=== Structures ===
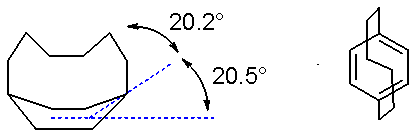
Structural details of [6]paracyclophanes, illustrating the distortion of the aromatic ring imposed by the (CH_{2})_{6} strap.

Paracyclophanes adopt the boat conformation normally observed in cyclohexanes. Smaller value of n lead to greater distortions. X-ray crystallography on '[6]paracyclophane' shows that the aromatic bridgehead carbon atom makes an angle of 20.5° with the plane. The benzyl carbons deviate by another 20.2°. The carbon-to-carbon bond length alternation has increased from 0 for benzene to 39 pm. Despite their distorted structures, cyclophanes retain their aromaticity, as determined by UV-vis spectroscopy.

=== Reactivity ===
With regards to their reactivity, cyclophanes often exhibit diene-like behavior, despite evidence for aromaticity in even the most distorted [6]-cyclophane. This highly distorted cyclophane photochemically converts to the Dewar benzene derivative. Heat reverses the reaction. With dimethyl acetylenedicarboxylate, [6]metacyclophane rapidly undergoes the Diels-Alder reaction.

A non-bonding nitrogen to arene distance of 244 pm is recorded for a pyridinophane and in the unusual superphane the two benzene rings are separated by a mere 262 pm. Other representative of this group are in-methylcyclophanes, in-ketocyclophanes and in,in-Bis(hydrosilane).

=== NMR properties ===
The proton NMR spectra of cyclophanes have been intensively examined to gain insights into the aromaticity of the benzene ring. Also of great interest is the shielding effects of the aromatic ring on the hydrocarbon strap. Generally the aromatic protons appear near their usual positions around 7.2 ppm, indicating that even with severe distortions, the ring retains aromaticity. The central methylene protons in the aliphatic bridge are shielded to a position of around - 0.5 ppm.

=== Synthesis ===
Original synthetic route to [6]-paracyclophane.

[6]paracyclophane can be synthesized beginning with the Bamford–Stevens reaction to form the spiro ketone 1 in scheme 3, rearranging in a pyrolysis reaction through the carbene intermediate 4. A separate route to the Dewar form involves a Ag^{+}-induced rearrangement reaction of the bicyclopropenyl compound 7.

Metacyclophanes are generally less strained and thus more easily prepared than paracyclophanes. Shown below is the route to a [14][14]metaparacyclophane in scheme 4 featuring a in-situ Ramberg-Bäcklund Reaction converting the sulfone 3 to the alkene 4.

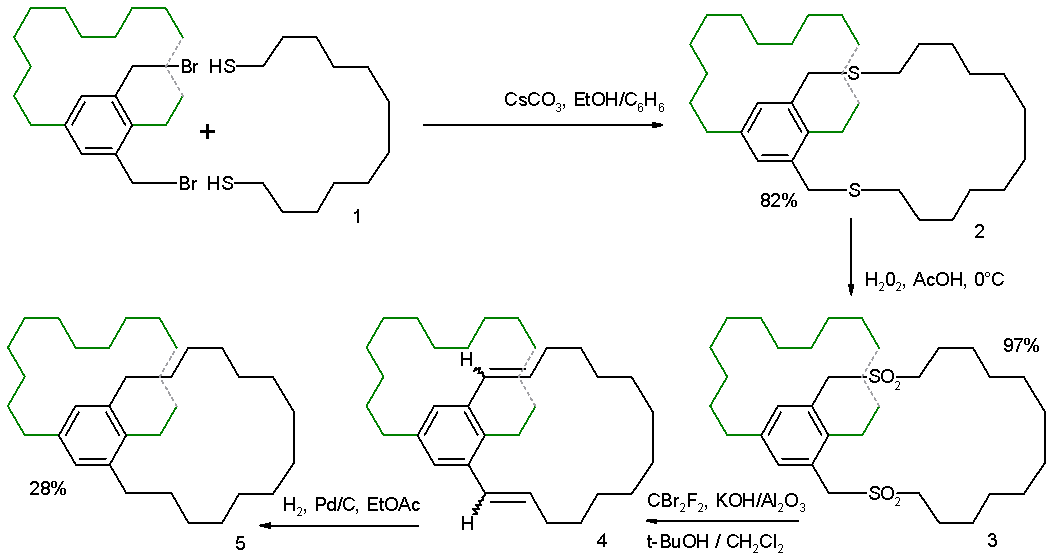
Scheme 4. [14][14]metaparacyclophane

=== Naturally occurring [n]-cyclophanes ===
A few cyclophanes exist in nature. One example of a metacyclophane is cavicularin.

Haouamine A is a paracyclophane found in a certain species of tunicate. Because of its potential application as an anticancer drug it is also available from total synthesis via an alkyne - pyrone Diels-Alder reaction in the crucial step with expulsion of carbon dioxide (scheme 5).

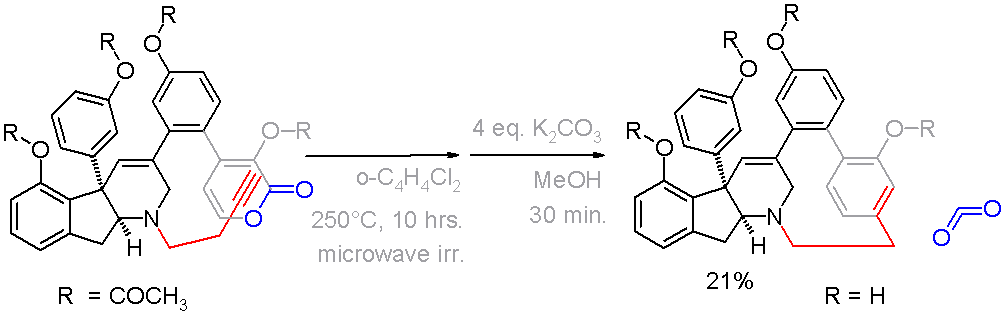
Scheme 5. Haouamine A

In this compound the deviation from planarity is 13° for the benzene ring and 17° for the bridgehead carbons. An alternative cyclophane formation strategy in scheme 6 was developed based on aromatization of the ring well after the formation of the bridge.

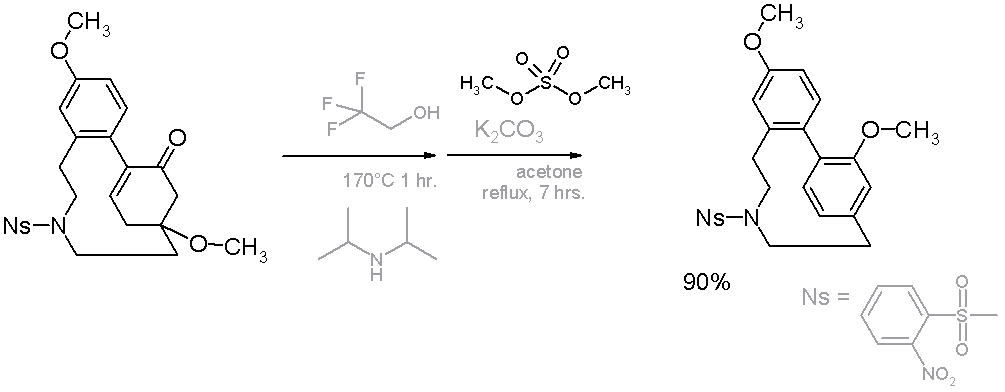
Scheme 6. Haouamine cyclophane substructure synthesis

Two additional types of cyclophanes were discovered in nature when they were isolated from two species of cyanobacteria from the family Nostocacae. These two classes of cyclophanes are both [7,7] paracyclophanes and were named after the species from which they were extracted: cylindrocyclophanes from Cylindrospermum lichenforme and nostocyclophanes from Nostoc linckia.

== [n.n]Paracyclophanes ==
Superphane.

A well studied member of the [n.n]paracyclophane family is [2.2]paracyclophane. One method for its preparation is by the 1,6-Hofmann elimination of 4-methylbenzyltrimethylammonium hydroxide:

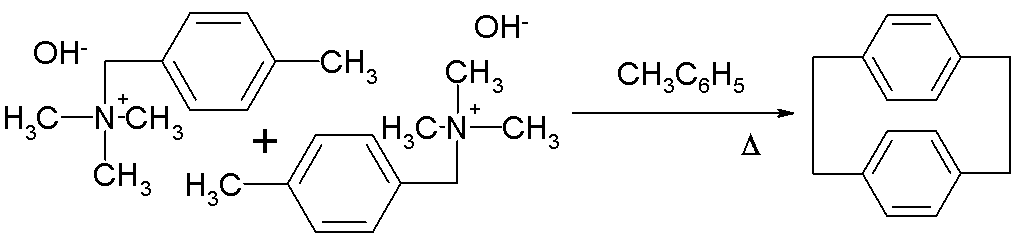
Synthesis of 2.2-paracyclophane.

The [2.2]paracyclophane-1,9-diene has been applied in ROMP to a poly(p-phenylene vinylene) with alternating cis-alkene and trans-alkene bonds using Grubbs' second generation catalyst:

The driving force for ring-opening and polymerization is strain relief. The reaction is believed to be a living polymerization due to the lack of competing reactions.

Because the two benzene rings are in close proximity this cyclophane type also serves as guinea pig for photochemical dimerization reactions as illustrated by this example:

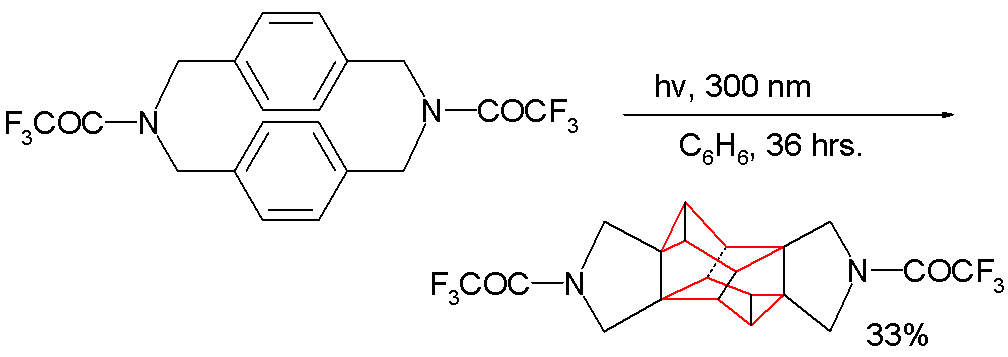
Formation of Octahedrane by Photochemical Dimerization of Benzene

The product formed has an octahedrane skeleton. When the amine group is replaced by a methylene group no reaction takes place: the dimerization requires through-bond overlap between the aromatic pi electrons and the sigma electrons in the C-N bond in the reactants LUMO.

== Janusene ==
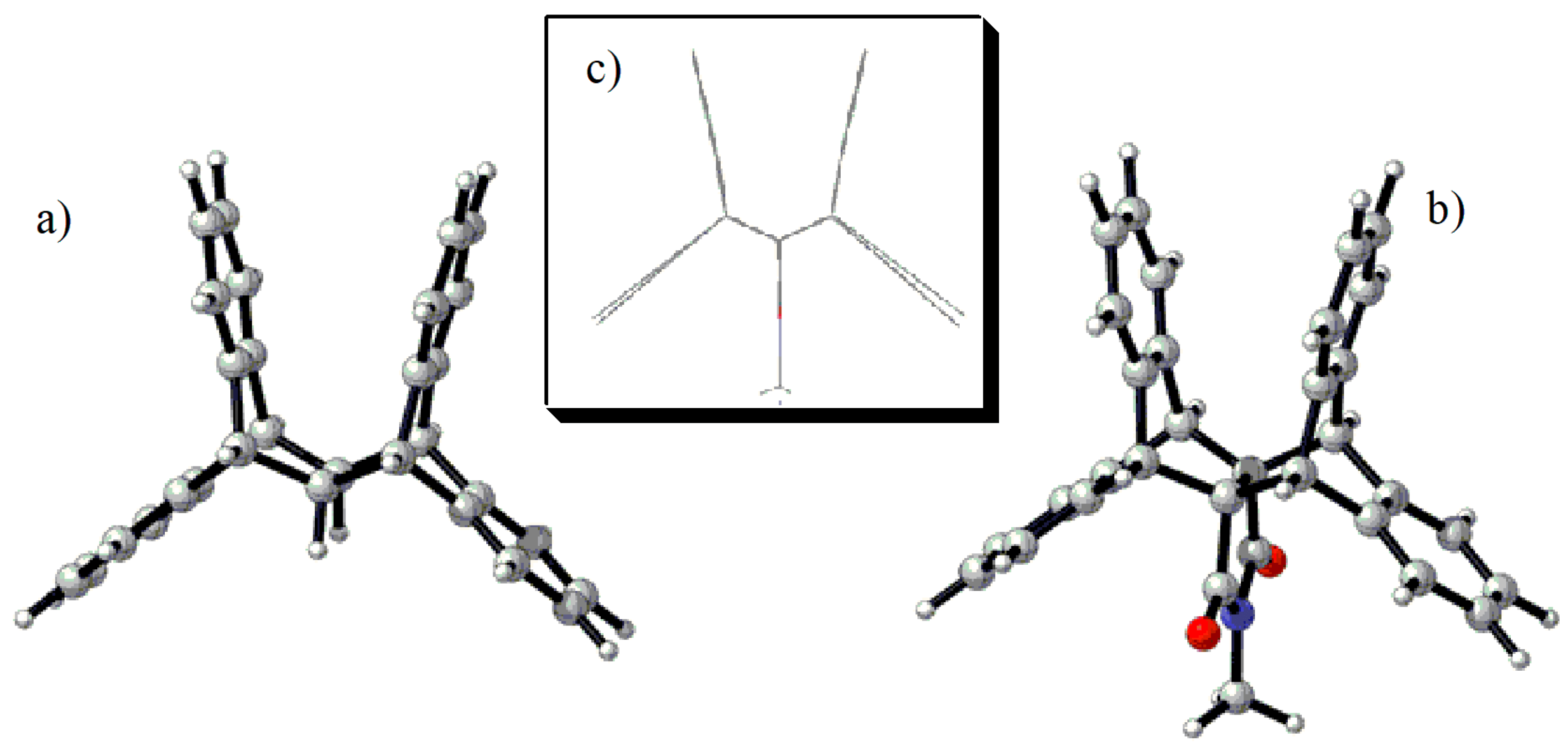
Two janusene derivatives: anthracene 5a,11a-janusenedicarboxylic anhydride and janusene N-methyl-5a,11a-dicarboximide

The symmetrical molecule [3.3]orthocyclophane, also known as janusene, is a cyclophane that contains 4 benzene rings in a cleft-shaped arrangement. First synthesized in 1967 by Stanley J. Cristol through the cycloaddition of anthracene and dibenzobarrelene, the molecule has been used to study stacking and interactions between cations and pi orbitals, particularly with silver ions. Derivatives and complexes of janusene have been created to study cation-pi interactions, transannular interactions in similar rigid aromatic molecules, and systems that depend on carbon-carbon distances.

Various synthetic methods for producing janusene have been developed since the original cycloaddition reaction was discovered, including microwave assisted reactions and acetylene transfer from 5,6,7,8-tetrafluorobenzobarrelene.

== Phanes ==
Generalization of cyclophanes led to the concept of phanes in the IUPAC nomenclature. Some example systematic phane names are:

- [14]metacyclophane is 1(1,3)-benzenacyclopentadecaphane
- [2.2']paracyclophane (or [2.2]paracyclophane) is 1,4(1,4)-dibenzenacyclohexaphane

In "1(1,3)-benzenacyclopentadecaphane", the "1" refers to the first position of the ring as a "superatom", the "(1,3)" describes the "meta" location, "benzena" refers to the ring, and the "pentadeca" (15) describes the chain length counting the ring as one atom.

== See also ==
- Cycloparaphenylene, cyclic all-para-linked phenyl groups.
- Calixarenes
- Donor-Acceptor Bridged Catenanes

== General sources ==
- B. H. Smith, Bridged Aromatic Compounds, Academic Press, New York, 1964. ISBN 978-0-323-16321-7
- P. M. Keehn, S. M. Rosenfeld (eds.), Cyclophanes, Vols. 1 and 2, Academic Press, New York, 1983. doi:10.1016/B978-0-12-403001-5.X5001-7 ISBN 978-0-12-403001-5
- F. Vögtle, F., G. Hohner, Top. Curr. Chem. 1978, 74, 1. doi:10.1007/BFb0050144
- F. Vögtle, P. Neumann, Top. Curr. Chem. 1983, 113, 1; 1985, 115, 1.
