= Trifluoroacetic anhydride =

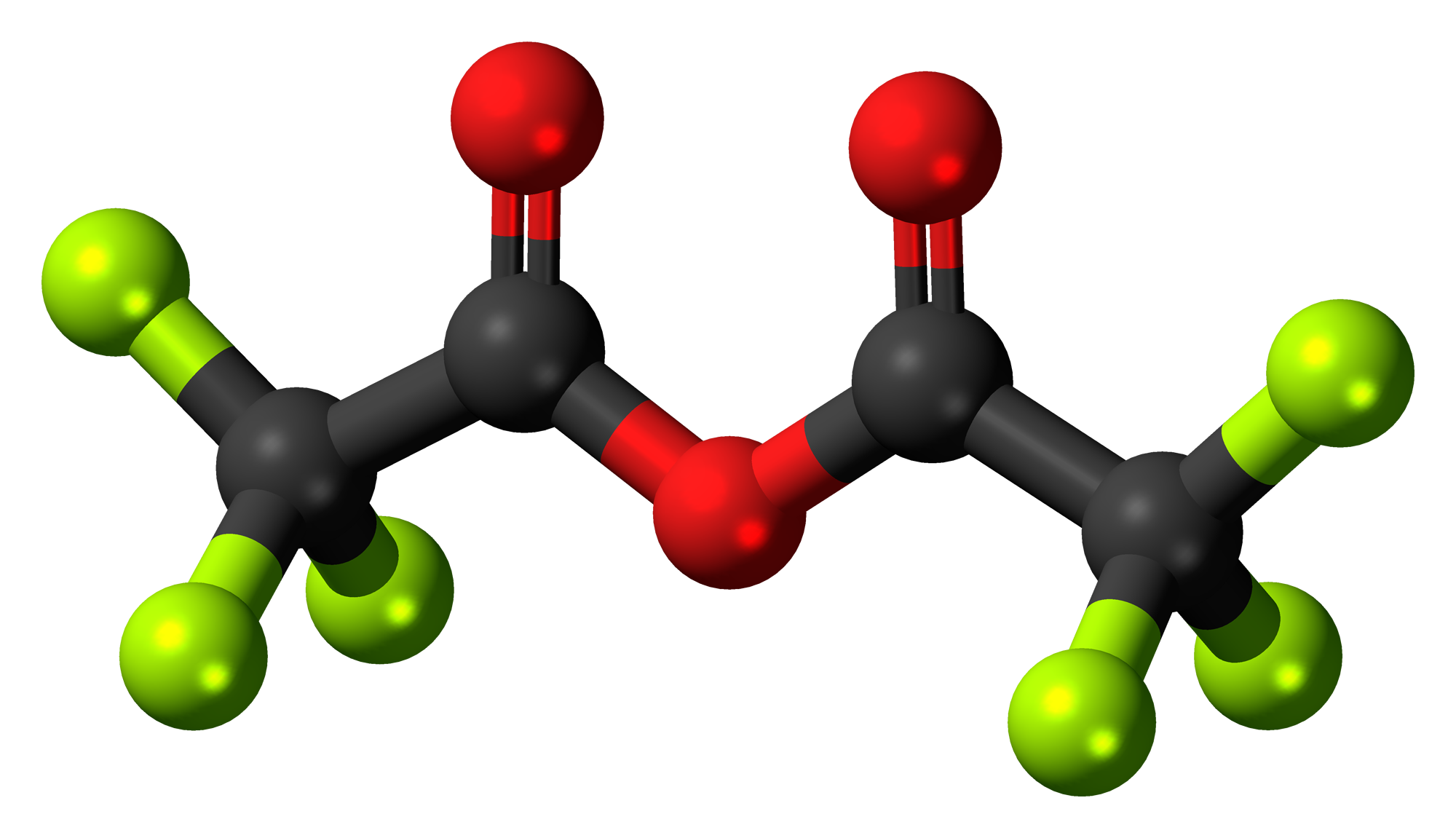

Names
- Preferred IUPAC name Trifluoroacetic anhydride
- Other names: 2,2,2-Trifluoroacetic anhydride; TFAA

Identifiers
CAS Number	407-25-0
3D model (JSmol)	Interactive image
ChemSpider	21106178
ECHA InfoCard	100.006.349
EC Number	206-982-9
PubChem CID	9845
UNII	5ENA87IZHT
CompTox Dashboard (EPA)	DTXSID90861920
- InChI: InChI=1S/C4F6O3/c5-3(6,7)1(11)13-2(12)4(8,9)10 Key: QAEDZJGFFMLHHQ-UHFFFAOYSA-N
- SMILES: C(=O)(C(F)(F)F)OC(=O)C(F)(F)F

Properties
Chemical formula	C_{4}F_{6}O_{3}
Molar mass	210.031 g·mol^{−1}
Appearance	colorless liquid
Density	1.511 g/mL (20°C)
Melting point	−65 °C (−85 °F; 208 K)
Boiling point	40 °C (104 °F; 313 K)
Solubility in water	reacts
Solubility	soluble in benzene, dichloromethane, ether, DMF, THF, acetonitrile

Hazards
- GHS labelling
Pictograms	(GHS05: Corrosive) (GHS07: Exclamation mark)
Signal word	Danger
Hazard statements	H314, H332
Precautionary statements	P280, P305+P351+P338, P310
Safety data sheet (SDS)	Oxford MSDS
- Except where otherwise noted, data are given for materials in their standard state (at 25 °C [77 °F], 100 kPa). verify (what is ?) Infobox references

Trifluoroacetic anhydride (TFAA) is the acid anhydride of trifluoroacetic acid. It is the perfluorinated derivative of acetic anhydride.

== Preparation ==
Trifluoroacetic anhydride was originally prepared by the dehydration of trifluoroacetic acid with phosphorus pentoxide. The dehydration might also be carried out with excess α-halogenated acid chlorides. For example, with dichloroacetyl chloride:

2 CF_{3}COOH + Cl_{2}CHCOCl → (CF_{3}CO)_{2}O + Cl_{2}CHCOOH + HCl

== Uses ==
Trifluoroacetic anhydride has various uses in organic synthesis.

It may be used to introduce the corresponding trifluoroacetyl group, for which it is more convenient than the corresponding acyl chloride, trifluoroacetyl chloride, which is a gas.

It can be used to promote reactions of carboxylic acids, including Friedel-Crafts acylation and acylation of other unsaturated compounds. Other electrophilic aromatic substitution reactions can also be promoted with trifluoroacetic anhydride, including nitration, sulfonation and nitrosylation.

Similar to acetic anhydride, trifluoroacetic anhydride can be used as a dehydrating agent and as an activator for the Pummerer rearrangement.

It can be used in place of oxalyl chloride in the Swern oxidation, allowing temperatures up to −30 °C.

With sodium iodide, it reduces sulfoxides to sulfides.

Trifluoroacetic anhydride is the recommended desiccant for trifluoroacetic acid.
