= Capravirine =

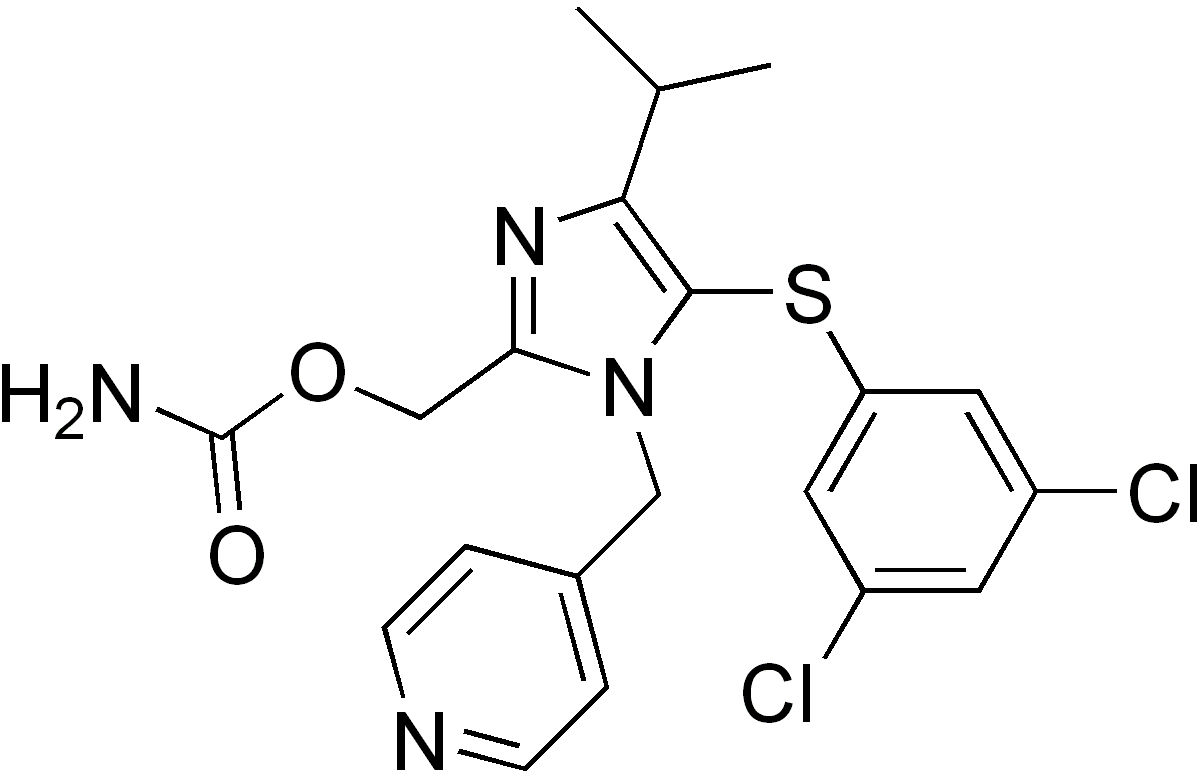

Names
- Preferred IUPAC name {5-[(3,5-Dichlorophenyl)sulfanyl]-4-(propan-2-yl)-1-[(pyridin-4-yl)methyl]-1H-imidazol-2-yl}methyl carbamate

Identifiers
CAS Number	178979-85-6
3D model (JSmol)	Interactive image
ChEMBL	ChEMBL435128
ChemSpider	1717
PubChem CID	1783
UNII	VHC779598X
CompTox Dashboard (EPA)	DTXSID30170689
- InChI: InChI=1S/C20H20Cl2N4O2S/c1-12(2)18-19(29-16-8-14(21)7-15(22)9-16)26(10-13-3-5-24-6-4-13)17(25-18)11-28-20(23)27/h3-9,12H,10-11H2,1-2H3,(H2,23,27) Key: YQXCVAGCMNFUMQ-UHFFFAOYSA-N; InChI=1/C20H20Cl2N4O2S/c1-12(2)18-19(29-16-8-14(21)7-15(22)9-16)26(10-13-3-5-24-6-4-13)17(25-18)11-28-20(23)27/h3-9,12H,10-11H2,1-2H3,(H2,23,27) Key: YQXCVAGCMNFUMQ-UHFFFAOYAP
- SMILES: O=C(OCc2nc(c(Sc1cc(Cl)cc(Cl)c1)n2Cc3ccncc3)C(C)C)N

Properties
Chemical formula	C_{20}H_{20}Cl_{2}N_{4}O_{2}S
Molar mass	451.37 g·mol^{−1}
- Except where otherwise noted, data are given for materials in their standard state (at 25 °C [77 °F], 100 kPa). verify (what is ?) Infobox references

Capravirine is a non-nucleoside reverse transcriptase inhibitor which reached phase II trials before development was discontinued by Pfizer. Both phase IIb trials which were conducted failed to demonstrate that therapy with capravirine provided any significant advantage over existing triple-drug HIV therapies, and pharmacology studies showed that capravirine may interact with other HIV drugs.
