= Benzyltrimethylammonium hydroxide =

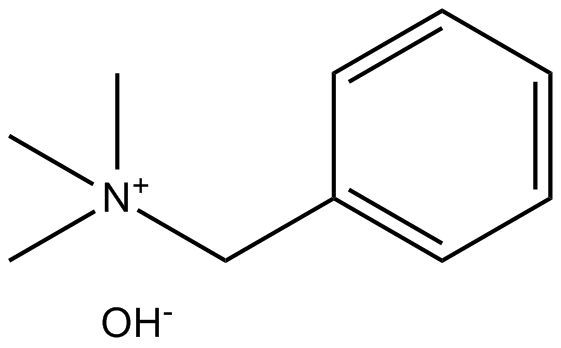

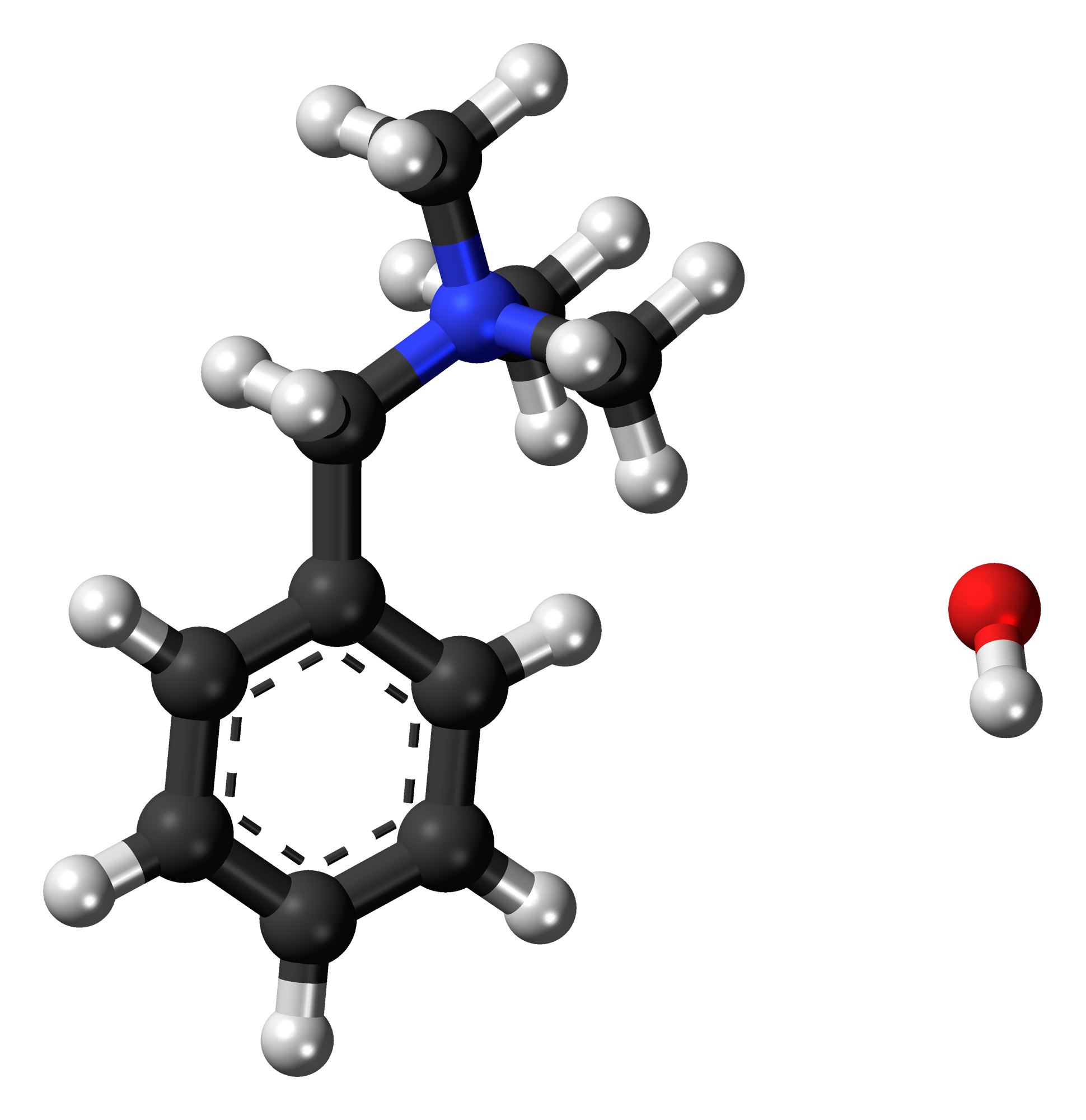

Names
- IUPAC name Benzyl(trimethyl)azanium hydroxide
- Other names Triton B, Trimethylbenzylammonium hydroxide, N,N,N-Trimethyl-1-phenylmethanaminium hydroxide

Identifiers
CAS Number	100-85-6
3D model (JSmol)	Interactive image
ChemSpider	60218
ECHA InfoCard	100.002.632
PubChem CID	66854
UNII	8P4488425W
CompTox Dashboard (EPA)	DTXSID3044332
- InChI: InChI=1S/C10H16N.H2O/c1-11(2,3)9-10-7-5-4-6-8-10;/h4-8H,9H2,1-3H3;1H2/q+1;/p-1 Key: NDKBVBUGCNGSJJ-UHFFFAOYSA-M; InChI=1/C10H16N.H2O/c1-11(2,3)9-10-7-5-4-6-8-10;/h4-8H,9H2,1-3H3;1H2/q+1;/p-1 Key: NDKBVBUGCNGSJJ-REWHXWOFAN
- SMILES: C[N+](C)(C)Cc1ccccc1.[OH-]

Properties
Chemical formula	C_{10}H_{17}NO
Molar mass	167.252 g·mol^{−1}
Appearance	Liquid, clear, slightly yellow
Density	0.95 g/mL
Solubility in water	Miscible in water
- Except where otherwise noted, data are given for materials in their standard state (at 25 °C [77 °F], 100 kPa). verify (what is ?) Infobox references

Benzyltrimethylammonium hydroxide, also known as Triton B or trimethylbenzylammonium hydroxide, is a quaternary ammonium salt that functions as an organic base. It is usually handled as a solution in water or methanol. The compound is colourless, although the solutions often appear yellowish. Commercial samples often have a distinctive fish-like odour, presumably due to the presence of trimethylamine via hydrolysis.

== Uses ==
Together with the benzyltriethylammonium salt, benzyltrimethylammonium hydroxide is a popular phase-transfer catalyst.

It is used in aldol condensation reactions and base-catalyzed dehydration reactions. It is also used as a base in Ando's Z-selective variant of Horner-Wadsworth-Emmons Olefination reactions.

Relative to tetramethylammonium hydroxide, benzyltriethylammonium hydroxide is more labile. In 6M NaOH at 160 °C their half-lives are 61.9 and 4 h, respectively.
