= Chelsea, South Dakota =

- Town
- Location in Faulk County and the state of South Dakota
- Coordinates: 45°10′03″N 98°44′36″W
- Country: United States
- State: South Dakota
- County: Faulk
- Incorporated: 1906

Area
  - Total: 0.32 sq mi (0.82 km^{2})
  - Land: 0.32 sq mi (0.82 km^{2})
  - Water: 0 sq mi (0.00 km^{2})
- Elevation: 1,345 ft (410 m)

Population (2020)
  - Total: 19
  - Density: 60.0/sq mi (23.15/km^{2})
- Time zone: UTC-6 (Central (CST))
  - Summer (DST): UTC-5 (CDT)
- Area code: 605
- FIPS code: 46-11500
- GNIS feature ID: 1267327

Chelsea is a town in Faulk County, South Dakota, United States. The population was 19 at the 2020 census.

The town was named after Chelsea, London, perhaps via Chelsea, Massachusetts.

== Geography ==
According to the United States Census Bureau, the town has a total area of 0.32 square miles (0.83 km^{2}), all land.

The town was founded in 1906.

== Demographics ==
Historical population
Census	Pop.	Note	%±
1920	110		—
1930	84		−23.6%
1940	51		−39.3%
1950	41		−19.6%
1960	53		29.3%
1970	45		−15.1%
1980	41		−8.9%
1990	33		−19.5%
2000	33		0.0%
2010	27		−18.2%
2020	19		−29.6%
U.S. Decennial Census

=== 2010 census ===
As of the census of 2010, there were 27 people, 13 households, and 8 families residing in the town. The population density was 84.4 inhabitants per square mile (32.6/km^{2}). There were 15 housing units at an average density of 46.9 per square mile (18.1/km^{2}). The racial makeup of the town was 100.0% White.

There were 13 households, of which 30.8% had children under the age of 18 living with them, 46.2% were married couples living together, 7.7% had a female householder with no husband present, 7.7% had a male householder with no wife present, and 38.5% were non-families. 38.5% of all households were made up of individuals, and 30.8% had someone living alone who was 65 years of age or older. The average household size was 2.08 and the average family size was 2.75.

The median age in the town was 53.5 years. 22.2% of residents were under the age of 18; 0.0% were between the ages of 18 and 24; 22.2% were from 25 to 44; 25.9% were from 45 to 64; and 29.6% were 65 years of age or older. The gender makeup of the town was 51.9% male and 48.1% female.

=== 2000 census ===
As of the census of 2000, there were 33 people, 13 households, and 7 families residing in the town. The population density was 104.0 inhabitants per square mile (40.2/km^{2}). There were 15 housing units at an average density of 47.3 per square mile (18.3/km^{2}). The racial makeup of the town was 100.00% White.

There were 13 households, out of which 38.5% had children under the age of 18 living with them, 53.8% were married couples living together, and 38.5% were non-families. 38.5% of all households were made up of individuals, and none had someone living alone who was 65 years of age or older. The average household size was 2.54 and the average family size was 3.50.

In the town, the population was spread out, with 27.3% under the age of 18, 9.1% from 18 to 24, 33.3% from 25 to 44, 24.2% from 45 to 64, and 6.1% who were 65 years of age or older. The median age was 36 years. For every 100 females, there were 135.7 males. For every 100 females age 18 and over, there were 140.0 males.

The median income for a household in the town was $11,875, and the median income for a family was $23,750. Males had a median income of $13,750 versus $16,875 for females. The per capita income for the town was $9,056. There were 50.0% of families and 43.8% of the population living below the poverty line, including 100.0% of under eighteens and none of those over 64.
