= Tetrabromo-o-xylene =

Names
- Preferred IUPAC name 1,2-Bis(dibromomethyl)benzene

Identifiers
| CAS Number | 13209-15-9 |
| 3D model (JSmol) | Interactive image |
| ChemSpider | 75099 |
| ECHA InfoCard | 100.032.873 |
| EC Number | 236-176-2 |
| PubChem CID | 83234 |
| UNII | 3WG2H68VX4 |
| CompTox Dashboard (EPA) | DTXSID7022255 |
- InChI: InChI=1S/C8H6Br4/c9-7(10)5-3-1-2-4-6(5)8(11)12/h1-4,7-8H Key: LNAOKZKISWEZNY-UHFFFAOYSA-N
- SMILES: C1=CC=C(C(=C1)C(Br)Br)C(Br)Br

Properties
| Chemical formula | C_{8}H_{6}Br_{4} |
| Molar mass | 421.752 g·mol^{−1} |
| Appearance | off white solid |
| Melting point | 115–116 °C (239–241 °F; 388–389 K) |

Hazards
- GHS labelling
| Pictograms | (GHS05: Corrosive) (GHS07: Exclamation mark) (GHS09: Environmental hazard) |
| Signal word | Danger |
| Hazard statements | H314, H335, H400 |
| Precautionary statements | P260, P264, P271, P273, P280, P301+P330+P331, P303+P361+P353, P304+P340, P305+P351+P338, P310, P312, P321, P363, P391, P403+P233, P405, P501 |
- Except where otherwise noted, data are given for materials in their standard state (at 25 °C [77 °F], 100 kPa). Infobox references

α,α,α',α'-Tetrabromo-o-xylene is an organobromine compound with the formula C_{6}H_{4}(CHBr_{2})_{2}. Three isomers of α,α,α',α'-Tetrabromoxylene exist, but the ortho derivative is most widely studied. It is an off-white solid. The compound is prepared by the photochemical reaction of o-xylene with elemental bromine:

C_{6}H_{4}(CH_{3})_{2} + 4 Br_{2} → C_{6}H_{4}(CHBr_{2})_{2} + 4 HBr

Reaction of α,α,α',α'-tetrabromo-o-xylene with sodium iodide affords α,α'-dibromo-o-xylylene, which can be trapped with dienophiles to give naphthylene. In the absence of trapping agents, the xylylene relaxes to α,α'-dibromobenzocyclobutane:

C_{6}H_{4}(CHBr_{2})_{2} + 2 NaI → C_{6}H_{4}(=CHBr)_{2} + 2 NaBr + I_{2}
C_{6}H_{4}(=CHBr)_{2} → C_{6}H_{4}(CHBr)_{2}

Cycloadditions of these xylylenes provides a pathway to acenes.
