= (2.2)Paracyclophane =

Names
- Preferred IUPAC name 1,4(1,4)-Dibenzenacyclohexaphane
- Other names [2.2](1,4)Cyclophane; 1,4-Carbophane; Cyclobis(benzene-1,4-dimethylene); Parylene dimer Di-p-xylylene

Identifiers
CAS Number	1633-22-3
3D model (JSmol)	Interactive image
ChEMBL	ChEMBL3278516
ChemSpider	66818
ECHA InfoCard	100.015.132
EC Number	216-644-2
PubChem CID	74210
UNII	0I9PQB142O
CompTox Dashboard (EPA)	DTXSID9061835
- InChI: InChI=1S/C16H16/c1-2-14-4-3-13(1)9-10-15-5-7-16(8-6-15)12-11-14/h1-8H,9-12H2 Key: OOLUVSIJOMLOCB-UHFFFAOYSA-N
- SMILES: C=1C=C2C=CC1CCC3=CC=C(C=C3)CC2

Properties
Chemical formula	C_{16}H_{16}
Molar mass	208.304 g·mol^{−1}
Appearance	White solid
Density	1.242 g/cm^{3} (260 K)
Melting point	285 °C (545 °F; 558 K)

Hazards
- GHS labelling
Pictograms	(GHS07: Exclamation mark) (GHS08: Health hazard)
Signal word	Warning
Hazard statements	H317, H373
Precautionary statements	P260, P272, P280, P302+P352, P319, P321, P333+P317, P362+P364, P501
- Except where otherwise noted, data are given for materials in their standard state (at 25 °C [77 °F], 100 kPa). Infobox references

[2.2]Paracyclophane is a cyclophane that is applied in bio- and materials science. It was first synthesized by Brown and Farthing in 1949 by pyrolyzing para-xylene in the gas phase under low pressure.

== Reactions ==
[2.2]Paracyclophane is stable under normal conditions. Its formyl, acetyl, nitro- and bromo- derivatives can be obtained by electrophilic aromatic substitution in one step.
