= Picoline-N-oxide =

Picoline-N-oxides
- Chemical structures of 2-, 3-, and 4-picoline-N-oxide (left to right)

Identifiers
CAS Number	2-Picoline-N-oxide: 931-19-1; 3-Picoline-N-oxide: 1003-73-2; 4-Picoline-N-oxide: 1003-67-4
3D model (JSmol)	2-Picoline-N-oxide: Interactive image; 3-Picoline-N-oxide: Interactive image; 4-Picoline-N-oxide: Interactive image
ChEBI	2-Picoline-N-oxide: CHEBI:35578
ChEMBL	2-Picoline-N-oxide: ChEMBL3186013
ChemSpider	2-Picoline-N-oxide: 13013; 3-Picoline-N-oxide: 13258; 4-Picoline-N-oxide: 13257
EC Number	2-Picoline-N-oxide: 213-230-3; 3-Picoline-N-oxide: 213-714-4; 4-Picoline-N-oxide: 213-712-3
PubChem CID	2-Picoline-N-oxide: 13602; 3-Picoline-N-oxide: 13858; 4-Picoline-N-oxide: 13857
UNII	2-Picoline-N-oxide: G41PJ47D1I; 3-Picoline-N-oxide: YA9Q5YUG2M; 4-Picoline-N-oxide: QIY3009LEH
- InChI: 2-Picoline-N-oxide: InChI=1S/C6H7NO/c1-6-4-2-3-5-7(6)8/h2-5H,1H3 Key: CFZKDDTWZYUZKS-UHFFFAOYSA-N; 3-Picoline-N-oxide: InChI=1S/C6H7NO/c1-6-3-2-4-7(8)5-6/h2-5H,1H3 Key: DMGGLIWGZFZLIY-UHFFFAOYSA-N; 4-Picoline-N-oxide: InChI=1S/C6H7NO/c1-6-2-4-7(8)5-3-6/h2-5H,1H3 Key: IWYYIZOHWPCALJ-UHFFFAOYSA-N
- SMILES: 2-Picoline-N-oxide: CC1=CC=CC=[N+]1[O-]; 3-Picoline-N-oxide: CC1=C[N+](=CC=C1)[O-]; 4-Picoline-N-oxide: CC1=CC=[N+](C=C1)[O-]

Properties
Chemical formula	C_{6}H_{7}NO
Molar mass	109.128 g·mol^{−1}
- Except where otherwise noted, data are given for materials in their standard state (at 25 °C [77 °F], 100 kPa). Infobox references

Picoline-N-oxide describes any of three isomers with the formula CH_{3}C_{5}H_{4}NO. All are colorless solids. Their properties and those of pyridine-N-oxide (C_{5}H_{5}NO) are similar.

Picoline-N-oxides (data from Chemical Abstracts unless noted otherwise)
Parameter	2-Picoline-N-oxide	3-Picoline-N-oxide	4-Picoline-N-oxide
Melting point (°C)	48-50	39	184
Boiling point (°C)	89-90 (0.8-0.9 Torr)	156 (16 Torr)	122-124 (1.5 Torr)
