= Chloromethyl group =

Functional group in organic chemistry

Structure of the chloromethyl group

In organic chemistry, the chloromethyl group is a functional group that has the chemical formula −CH_{2}−Cl. The naming of this group is derived from the methyl group (which has the formula −CH_{3}), by replacing one hydrogen atom by a chlorine atom. Compounds with this group are a subclass of the organochlorines.

== Preparation ==
One way of introducing a chloromethyl group into aromatic compounds is the chloromethylation by treatment of an appropriate precursor with formaldehyde and hydrogen chloride. In the Blanc reaction, zinc chloride is an additional reagent. In some cases, a hydrochloric acid or mixtures of hydrochloric and other acids are used as the chloride source.

Alternatively, chloromethyl groups can be prepared from hydroxymethyl groups, e.g. using thionyl chloride.

Many chloromethylated compounds are produced by chlorination of the methyl precursor. Millions of kilograms of benzyl chloride are prepared by the photochemical reaction of toluene with chlorine:

C_{6}H_{5}CH_{3} + Cl_{2} → C_{6}H_{5}CH_{2}Cl + HCl

== Reactions ==
Chloromethylated compounds are often good alkylating agents. The chloride can be replaced by hydrogen using zinc or stannous chloride. In this way, chloromethylation provides a means to methylate substrates:

R−H + CH_{2}O + HCl → R−CH_{2}Cl + H_{2}O
R−CH_{2}Cl + HCl + M → R−CH_{3} + MCl_{2}

== See also ==
- Trichloromethyl group
