= Stanley J. Cristol =

American organic chemist (1916–2008)

- Born: June 14, 1916; Chicago, Illinois
- Died: January 23, 2008 (aged 91); Durango, Colorado
- Known for: Development of DDT; Study of elimination reaction mechanisms

Stanley Jerome Cristol (June 14, 1916 – January 23, 2008) was an American organic chemist. A chemistry professor and long-time faculty member of the University of Colorado Boulder Chemistry and Biochemistry Department, he was named Chair of the American Chemical Society Colorado Section in 1952, was a two-time Guggenheim Fellowship awardee in 1955 and 1980, and was elected to the National Academy of Sciences in 1972.

Born in Chicago, Illinois, Cristol began working on isolating insecticide compounds for the United States Department of Agriculture shortly after graduating from University of California, Los Angeles. He taught chemistry in various roles at the University of Colorado Boulder from 1946 to his retirement in 1986, researching elimination and addition reactions and polycyclic compounds.

== Education ==
He received a Bachelor of Science with highest distinction from Northwestern University in 1937 and received his Ph. D. degree in organic chemistry with honors from University of California, Los Angeles in 1943. At the time of his graduation, he was a member of Phi Beta Kappa, having been elected during his education at Northwestern University. He spent the next year at the University of Illinois Urbana-Champaign as a postdoctoral researcher with Roger Adams, after which he began the first major work of his post-graduation career at the United States Department of Agriculture (USDA) lab in Beltsville, Maryland.

== Career ==
Cristol started working with insecticides for the USDA at Beltsville in 1944. DDT had been a known chemical for decades at that point, though its insecticidal properties were only discovered in 1939 by Paul Hermann Müller. Cristol was tasked with isolating impurities in insecticide samples, coming to identify the most potent compound as the p,p'-DDT isomer. Once his isolation work was completed, Cristol began investigating elimination reactions with DDT and similar analogues in an effort to clarify the mechanism of the insecticides. He did not discover any correlation between rate of reaction and insecticidal activity, but his work was later praised for its "clarity and rigor". By 1946, he had left Beltsville to work at the University of Colorado Department of Chemistry.

Cristol was appointed assistant professor at the Department of Chemistry in 1946. In 1950, he was involved in an incident in which the flow of a fume hood was accidentally reversed during an experiment, blowing phosgene gas into the room and hospitalizing four students. He did not receive full professorship until 1955. In that year, he became a Guggenheim fellow at the California Institute of Technology, ETH Zurich, and University College London. His research ranged from elimination reactions involving chloride ions to acid-catalyzed addition reactions and syntheses of polycyclic molecules.

While on the board of editors of the Journal of Organic Chemistry, he was a recipient of the first Colorado Section Award in Chemistry, established in 1966 and awarded in 1967. Later, he received the James Flack Norris Award for his research on the chemistry of small ring compounds in 1972, the same year he was elected to the National Academy of Sciences.

== Personal life ==
Stanley Cristol married Barbara Wright Swingle in 1957. She had 3 children prior to their marriage and 5 in total. The family was known to be interested in skiing.

Cristol retired in 1986 and lived in Durango, Colorado until his death in 2008.

== Selected publications ==
- Cristol, S. J.; Haller, H. L. (1945). "The chemistry of DDT. A Review". Chem. Eng. News. 23 (22): 2070–2075. doi:10.1021/cen-v023n022.p2070.
- Cristol, S. J. (1947). "The kinetics of the alkaline dehydrochlorination of the benzene hexachloride isomers. The mechanism of second-order elimination reactions". J. Am. Chem. Soc. 69 (2): 338–342. doi:10.1021/ja01194a054.
- Cristol, S. J.; Hause, N. L.; Meek, J. S. (1951). "Mechanisms of elimination reactions. III. The kinetics of the alkaline dehydrochlorination of the benzene hexachloride isomers. II". J. Am. Chem. Soc. 73 (2): 674–679. doi:10.1021/ja01146a050.
- Cristol, S. J.; Fix, D. D. (1953). "Mechanisms of elimination reactions. X. Deuterium exchange in base-promoted dehydrochlorination of β-benzene hexachloride". J. Am. Chem. Soc. 75 (11): 2647–2648. doi:10.1021/ja01107a027.
- Cristol, S. J.; Arganbright, R. P. (1957). "Bridged polycyclic compounds. IV. The stereochemistry of the free radical addition of p-thiocresol to a bicyclo[2,2,1]heptene and a bicyclo[2,2,2]octene". J. Am. Chem. Soc. 79 (22): 6039–6041. doi:10.1021/ja01579a052.
- Cristol, S. J.; Brindell, G. D.; Reeder, J. A. (1958). "Bridged polycyclic compounds. V. The addition of p-thiocresol to norbornadiene. The question of non-classical free radicals". J. Am. Chem. Soc. 80 (3): 635–640. doi:10.1021/ja01536a034.
- Cristol, S. J.; Snell, R. L. (1958). "Bridged polycyclic compounds. VI. The photoisomerization of bicyclo[2,2,1]hepta-2,5-diene-2,3-dicarboxylic acid to quadricyclo[2,2,1.0^{2,6}0^{3,5}]heptane-2,3-dicarboxylic acid". J. Am. Chem. Soc. 80 (8): 1950–1952. doi:10.1021/ja01541a043.
- Cristol, S. J.; Firth, Jr., W. C. (1961). "A convenient synthesis of alkyl halides from carboxylic acids". J. Org. Chem. 26: 280. doi:10.1021/jo01060a628.
- Cristol, S. J.; Sequeira, R. M.; DePuy, C. H. (1965). "Bridged polycyclic compounds. XXXI. Stereochemical aspects of the solvolysis of cyclopropyl chlorides". J. Am. Chem. Soc. 87 (17): 4007–4008. doi:10.1021/ja01095a057.
- Cristol, S. J.; Morrill, T. C.; Sanchez, R. A. (1966). "Bridged polycyclic compounds. XXXIX. Addition of acetic acid to norbornadiene. Mechanisms of addition reactions". J. Org. Chem. 31 (9): 2719–2725. doi:10.1021/jo01347a001.
- Cristol, S. J.; Mayo, G. O.; Lee, G. A. (1966). "Bridged polycyclic compounds. LV. Photoisomerization via carbonium ion intermediates". J. Am. Chem. Soc. 91: 214–215. doi:10.1021/ja01029a053.
- Cristol, S. J.; Lee, G. A. (1966). "Photochemical transformations. V. Allylic rearrangements and rearrangement of allylic halides to cyclopropyl halides". J. Am. Chem. Soc. 91 (26): 7554–7555. doi:10.1021/ja01054a081.
- Cristol, S. J.; Greenwald, B. E. (1976). "Photochemical transformations. XVI. Singlet and triplet photoreactions of benzyl chloride in protic solvents". Tetrahedron Lett. 17 (25): 2105–2108. doi:10.1016/S0040-4039(00)93130-7.
- Cristol, S. J.; Ilenda, C. S.; Daughenbaugh, R. J. (1976). "Photochemical transformations. XV. A technique for determining triplet lifetimes in photosensitized reactions". Mol. Photochem. 7: 287–293.
- Cristol, S. J. (1986). "The synthesis of quadricyclenes: A retrospective look". Tetrahedron. 42: 1617–1619. doi:10.1016/S0040-4020(01)87578-5.
