= C. Frederick Koelsch =

American organic chemist

Charles Frederick Koelsch
- Born: January 31, 1907; Boise, Idaho
- Died: December 24, 1999 (aged 92); Rochester, Minnesota
- Scientific career
- Fields: Organic chemistry, synthetic chemistry
- Institutions: University of Minnesota
- Doctoral advisor: Samuel M. McElvain
- Notable students: Virgil Boekelheide

Charles Frederick Koelsch (31 January 1907 - 24 December 1999) was an American organic chemist who spent his faculty career at the University of Minnesota.

== Education and academic career ==
Koelsch was born in Boise, Idaho in 1907 in a family of German descent. He attended the University of Wisconsin and earned his bachelor's degree in 1928 and his Ph.D. from the same institution in 1931, working under the supervision of Samuel M. McElvain. After a postdoctoral fellowship at Harvard University with Elmer Peter Kohler, Koelsch was recommended for a position at the University of Minnesota by Lee Irvin Smith. He joined the faculty there as an instructor in 1932 and became an assistant professor in 1934. Koelsch was awarded the ACS Award in Pure Chemistry in 1934. He advanced to associate professor in 1937 and full professor in 1946. He remained at the University of Minnesota until his retirement, assuming professor emeritus status, in 1973. Through much of his academic career, Koelsch also served as an industry consultant, working first with Smith, Kline & French and later with Sterling Drug and Union Carbide.

Chemical structure of the Koelsch radical

During his work at Harvard, Koelsch attempted to publish a paper describing an unusually stable radical compound, but it was rejected at the time on the grounds that the compound's properties were unlikely to describe a radical. Subsequent experimental evidence and quantum mechanics calculations suggested his interpretation of the original experiment was correct, resulting in the publication of the paper nearly 25 years after the original experiments. The compound - 1,3-bisdiphenylene-2-phenylallyl (BDPA) - is now often referred to as the "Koelsch radical".

== Personal life ==
Koelsch married his wife Helen in 1938 and the couple had three children. He was a ham radio enthusiast. He died in Rochester, Minnesota in 1999.
