= Robert Percy Barnes =

American chemist; first African American chemistry PhD recipient from Harvard

- Born: 26 February 1898; Shiloh, Maryland
- Died: 18 March 1990 (aged 92); Washington, D.C.
- Education: Amherst College; Harvard University
- Scientific career
- Workplaces: Howard University
- Thesis: The reactions and keto-enol equilibria of an alpha diketone
- Doctoral advisor: Elmer P. Kohler
- Notable students: Harold Delaney

Robert Percy Barnes (February 26, 1898 - March 18, 1990) was an American chemist and professor, and the first African American to graduate with a PhD in chemistry from Harvard University. He was also the first African American faculty member hired at Amherst College.

== Early life and education ==
Robert Percy Barnes was born on February 26, 1898, in Shiloh, Maryland. His parents were Mary Jane Thomas and Reverend William Humphrey Barnes, and he was the second of four brothers.

Barnes attended the M Street High School (now Dunbar High School) in Washington, D.C., which was one of the first high schools for African American students in the country. While at Dunbar, one of his teachers was Jane Eleanor Datcher, who was the first African-American woman to earn an advanced degree from Cornell University. He then went on to study at Amherst College in Amherst, Massachusetts, for his undergraduate studies. While at Amherst, he ran track and field. He graduated with a bachelor's degree in chemistry in 1921, and graduated Phi Beta Kappa.

== Career and doctoral studies ==
=== Professor at Howard University ===
Following graduation, Barnes was appointed a chemistry instructor at Amherst, making him the first African American member of the faculty there. The college wouldn't hire a tenure-track faculty member until James Q. Denton in 1964.

In 1922, Barnes was hired at Howard University in Washington, D.C., as a faculty member in the chemistry department. While at Howard, one of his doctoral students was Harold Delaney, who later went on to work as a chemist on the Manhattan Project. In 1945, Barnes was made a full professor at Howard, where he would teach until 1968. He also served as head of the chemistry department in the 1950s. Over the course of his career there, he advanced the chemistry department from a masters-only program to granting doctoral degrees.

Barnes, along with fellow professors Roscoe McKinney, Sterling Brown, and Mercer Cook, charted Phi Beta Kappa at Howard, and all were also members of the Gamma chapter of Omega Psi Phi, which was founded at Howard in 1911. In the 1940s, he was selected for a government program to study explosives at the onset of World War II. He also led an intensive course at Howard funded by the National Defense Program that was the only program in the country of its type for African American students.

Barnes taught at Howard until his retirement in 1967.

=== Studies at Harvard University ===
As he began his teaching career, Barnes also began his doctoral studies at Harvard University. His studies were funded in part by a four-year fellowship funded by the General Education Board. He earned his master's degree in chemistry in 1931 and his PhD in 1933. Upon receiving his degree, he became the first African American person to receive a PhD in chemistry at Harvard. His doctoral advisor was Elmer P. Kohler, and he likely also studied with James B. Conant. His thesis was titled "The reactions and keto-enol equilibria of an alpha diketone."

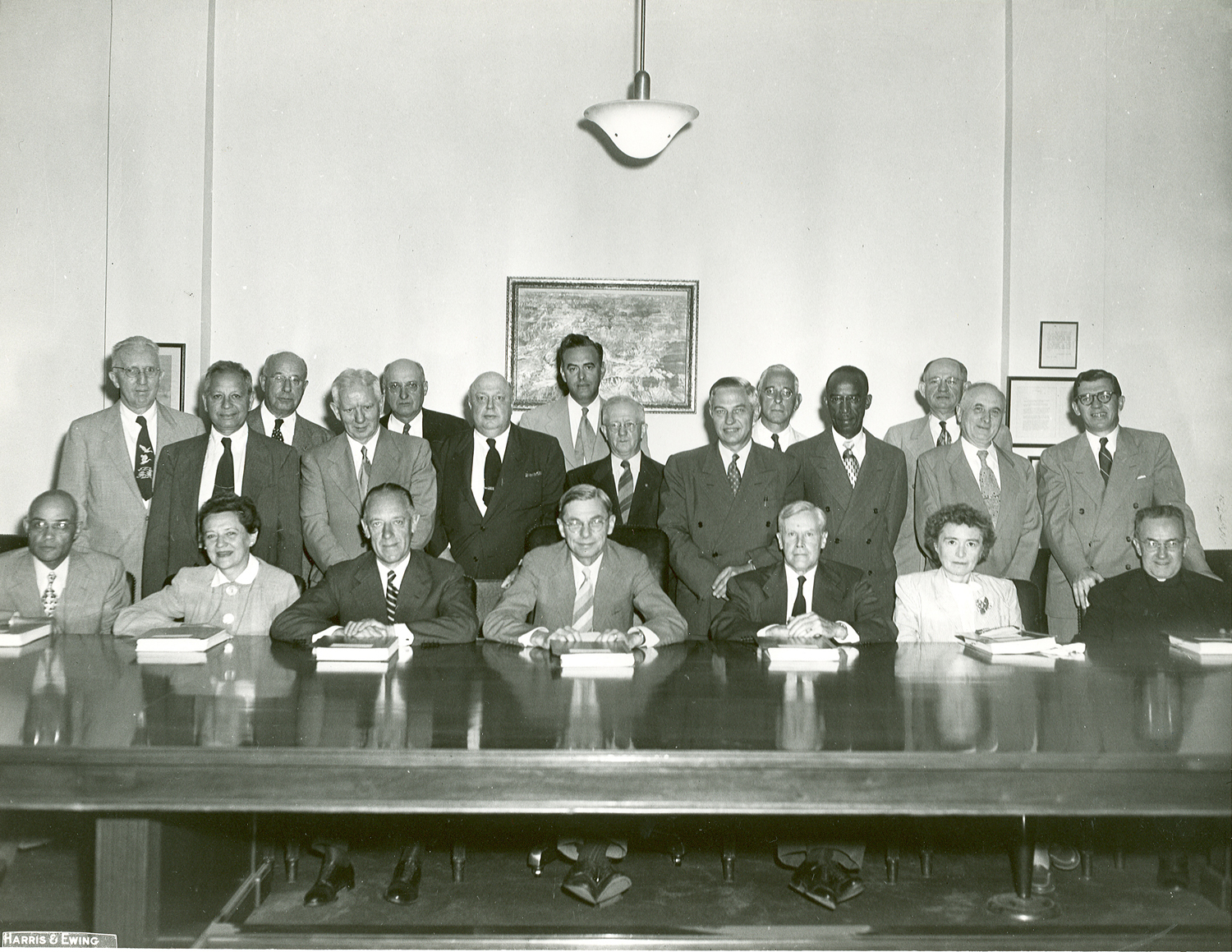
National Science Board Members, July 1951. Barnes is in the second row, third from the right.

=== National Science Board ===
Following the passage of the National Science Foundation Act of 1950, in 1950, President Harry Truman named Barnes as a member of the National Science Board of the National Science Foundation. Barnes was one of two African American members of the board at this point, along with John Warren Davis from West Virginia State College (now West Virginia State University). In 1952, Truman reappointed Barnes to the board, along with seven other scientists. He remained on the Board until 1958.

== Research ==
Barnes' research primarily focused on the chemistry of diketone molecules, and he published in numerous outlets, including the Journal of the American Chemical Society and The Journal of Organic Chemistry.

== Personal life ==
Barnes married Ethel Hasbrook in 1922, and the couple later divorced. He married Florence Abrams Barnes in 1933, and the couple was married until her death in 1981. Outside of work, he was a bridge player and a member of the Anglers All Fishing Club.
