= Harold Delaney =

African American scientist (1919–1994)

7th President of Manhattanville College
- In office 1975–1985
- Succeeded by: Barbara Knowles Debs

Personal details
- Born: 1919 Philadelphia, Pennsylvania, US
- Died: August 2, 1994 (aged 74–75) Pilot Mountain, North Carolina, U.S.
- Cause of death: Homicide
- Spouse: Geraldine Delaney
- Education: Howard University

Harold Delaney (1919 – August 2, 1994) was a researcher, scholar, educator and collegiate administrative leader in the field of chemistry, known for his work on the Manhattan Project and atomic bomb. Delaney was one of the few African American chemists to work on the Manhattan Project at the University of Chicago.

== Education ==
Harold Delaney was born in Philadelphia in 1919. Delaney graduated from Howard University three times and completed three degrees of higher education there: Bachelors of Science in 1941, Masters of Science in chemistry in 1943, and PhD in chemistry in 1958 in which he was one of the first at his school to graduate with a doctorate in this field. His doctoral advisor at Howard was Robert Percy Barnes, who had been the first African American person to receive a PhD in chemistry from Harvard University.

== Career ==
From 1943 to 1945, Delaney worked on the Manhattan Project for the atomic bomb during World War II, and for many of his later career years he worked at colleges and universities in educator and administrative roles. From 1945 to 1948 Delaney was an educator at North Carolina Agricultural & Technical University, and then during 1948–1961 he taught chemistry and also served as the Chemistry Department chair and dean at Morgan State University. In 1972 he ended his role as acting vice chancellor for university colleges at State University of New York, the college where he was also Associate Dean.

From 1971 to 1974, Delaney was the University of North Carolina's Vice President. Delaney served two years of presidency at Manhattanville College, which was founded by the Sacred Heart and transitioned from being religious to independent, in 1974 and 1975. Before retiring in 1987 Delaney held the position of Vice President Emeritus for about 10 years at the American Association of State Colleges and Universities.

In Delaney's later years of his career he was interim president of several universities for about one year each, including Chicago State University, Frostburg State University, and Bowie State University before retiring from Bowie State in 1993. Along with holding many leadership positions at the university level, Delaney was a member of the American Chemical Society and on the board of the Washington Center.

== Personal life ==
Harold Delaney was born in Philadelphia in 1919. Delaney's wife, Geraldine Delaney, was born in North Carolina and worked as a special education teacher from 1953 to 1968, and was educated at North Carolina Agricultural & Technical State University. The Delaneys were married for 48 years. At the time of their deaths, the couple lived in Silver Spring, Maryland but were visiting relatives in Pilot Mountain, North Carolina. They had bought a house there for Mrs. Delaney's mother, Mrs. Sophia East, and stayed in it when visiting.

The Delaneys died in Pilot Mountain, North Carolina, on August 2, 1994, from homicide by beating. Delaney was 74 years old; his wife was 71. Geraldine Delaney's nephew, Keith Bradley East, was subsequently tried and convicted of their first-degree murders and of first-degree burglary, felonious larceny and robbery with a dangerous weapon.

== See also ==
- African-American scientists and technicians on the Manhattan Project
