= Lucile Hac =

American biochemist and microbiologist

Lucile Rose Hac (May 18, 1909 – December 27, 2006) was an American biochemist and microbiologist whose research interests included amino acids, antibiotics, and bone metabolism. She was director of research at International Minerals and Chemical Corporation and a faculty member in the biochemistry department at Northwestern University.

== Life ==
Hac was born on 18 May 1909 in Lincoln, Nebraska, and became valedictorian at Lincoln High School, graduating in 1926. She earned bachelor's and master's degrees in chemistry at the University of Nebraska in 1930 and 1931, respectively, earning Phi Beta Kappa honors in 1931. She completed her Ph.D. in organic chemistry in 1935 at the University of Minnesota. Her dissertation, The Addition of Cyclopentadiene to Ortho-benzoquinones, was supervised by Lee Irvin Smith.

After working as a bacteriologist for the Maryland State Health Department and a visiting lecturer at Johns Hopkins University, she worked as a research assistant and instructor at the University of Chicago in the Department of Obstetrics and Gynecology from 1936 to 1943. From 1943 to 1961, she worked at the International Minerals and Chemical Corporation, becoming their director of research. In 1961 she took a faculty position as associate professor of biochemistry at Northwestern University; she retired in 1977.

After retiring, she worked as a career counselor in Winnetka, Illinois, before returning to Lincoln to assist her older sister Marguerite, a music teacher who died in 2003. She died in Lincoln on December 27, 2006.

== Recognition ==
Hac was named a Fellow of the American Association for the Advancement of Science in 1951, and as research director at the International Minerals and Chemical Corporation was listed in Chemical Who's Who.
