= Koelsch radical =

- Two resonance forms showing the predominant locations of the unpaired electron at the 1 and 3 positions

Names
- Preferred IUPAC name 9-[(9H-Fluoren-9-ylidene)(phenyl)methyl]-9H-fluoren-9-yl

Identifiers
CAS Number	benzene complex: 35585-94-5
3D model (JSmol)	Interactive image
ChemSpider	17339337
PubChem CID	16211312
- InChI: InChI=1S/C33H21/c1-2-12-22(13-3-1)31(32-27-18-8-4-14-23(27)24-15-5-9-19-28(24)32)33-29-20-10-6-16-25(29)26-17-7-11-21-30(26)33/h1-21H Key: GKAAGBJMSDXTLM-UHFFFAOYSA-N
- SMILES: C1=CC=C(C=C1)C(=C2C3=CC=CC=C3C4=CC=CC=C42)[C]5C6=CC=CC=C6C7=CC=CC=C75

Properties
Chemical formula	C33H21
- Except where otherwise noted, data are given for materials in their standard state (at 25 °C [77 °F], 100 kPa). Infobox references

The Koelsch radical (also known as Koelsch's radical and 1,3-bisdiphenylene-2-phenylallyl or α,γ-bisdiphenylene-β-phenylallyl, abbreviated BDPA) is a chemical compound that is an unusually stable carbon-centered radical, due to its resonance structures.

== Properties ==
BDPA is an unusually stable radical compound due to the extent to which its electrons are delocalized through resonance structures. The unpaired electron is located predominantly at the 1 and 3 positions. Steric effects from the biphenyl substituents also contribute to the compound's stability.

== Uses ==
BDPA and closely related compounds are used as molecular standards in electron paramagnetic resonance (EPR) and electron nuclear double resonance (ENDOR) experiments, and as a polarizing agent in dynamic nuclear polarization (DNP) nuclear magnetic resonance (NMR) experiments. Because BDPA itself is hydrophobic, derivatives have been developed that are more soluble in aqueous solution.

== History ==
The compound was first synthesized by C. Frederick Koelsch while he was a postdoctoral fellow at Harvard University in the 1930s. He attempted to publish a paper describing the compound, but the paper was rejected on the grounds that the described properties, particularly stability, were unlikely to be those of a radical. Subsequent experimental evidence and quantum mechanics calculations suggested his interpretation of the original experiment was correct, resulting in the publication of the paper in 1957, nearly 25 years after the original experiments. Although the original report described stability on the order of years, modern experiments suggest that this family of compounds, while unusually stable for radicals, shows measurable degradation in months after preparation.
