= Lee Irvin Smith =

American organic chemist

- Born: July 22, 1891; Indianapolis, Indiana
- Died: March 29, 1973 (aged 81); Minneapolis, Minnesota
- Scientific career
- Fields: Organic chemistry, synthetic chemistry
- Institutions: University of Minnesota
- Doctoral advisor: Elmer Peter Kohler
- Doctoral students: Lucile Hac

Lee Irvin Smith (July 22, 1891 – March 29, 1973) was an American organic chemist who spent his research career on the faculty at the University of Minnesota, where he served as chief of the chemistry department's organic chemistry division.

== Early life and education ==
Smith was born in Indianapolis, Indiana in 1891, the oldest of three sons. He was raised mostly in Columbus, Ohio, where the family moved when Smith was a child. His father was a piano maker and Smith learned to play from a young age. Smith attended Ohio State University and developed an interest in chemistry after a course taught by William Lloyd Evans. Smith received his bachelor's degree in 1913 and remained at Ohio State for a master's degree received in 1915. He then moved to Harvard University, where he studied organic chemistry under the supervision of Elmer Peter Kohler. He received a second master's degree from Harvard in 1917 and his PhD in 1920. His graduate work was interrupted by World War I, during which he served as a second lieutenant and worked on a wartime project with Kohler and others on Lewisite from late 1917 to the end of the conflict in 1918.

== Academic career ==
Smith was appointed as an instructor of chemistry at the University of Minnesota – not yet a major research institution in chemistry at the time – following the completion of his PhD in 1920. By 1932 he had become full professor and the chief of the organic division of the department of chemistry, a position he would occupy for over 25 years. His work in this position is recognized as influential in establishing the university's role in organic chemistry research. Starting in 1932 he recruited young scientists to expand the department, including C. Frederick Koelsch, Paul Doughty Bartlett, and later Richard T. Arnold. Smith stepped down from his chief position in 1958 and was succeeded by William E. Parham, and retired fully in 1960. Throughout his academic career Smith also worked as an industry consultant with Merck & Co. and General Mills.

Smith served on a number of editorial boards and was the president of the American Chemical Society's organic division in 1941–2. He was elected to the United States National Academy of Sciences in 1944.

== Research ==
Smith is best known for his synthesis of vitamin E in 1939. He also published extensively on related tocopherol compounds. He was also the first to publish a synthesis of a bicyclopropyl ketone. In addition his research group studied alkylbenzenes, benzoquinones, and the Jacobsen rearrangement.
