= Conant Report =

1959 report on American secondary schooling

- Author: James B. Conant
- Subject: Secondary education in the United States
- Publisher: McGraw-Hill
- Publication date: 1959

The American High School Today: A First Report to Interested Citizens, better known as the Conant Report, is a 1959 assessment of American secondary schooling and 21 recommendations, authored by James B. Conant.

== Publication ==
During his term as United States ambassador to West Germany, James B. Conant arranged for a Carnegie Corporation-funded, intensive study of American high schools to commence upon his return. His researchers studied 100 high schools across 18 states between September 1957 and July 1958. En route to becoming a best seller, its 1959 publication coincided with major media coverage, with articles in Life, Newsweek, Time, and U.S. News & World Report each heralding the report's conclusion that American public high schools could be improved without radical changes.

== Bibliography ==
- Burton, D. L. (1959). "Review of The American High School Today". The English Journal. 48 (5): 290–291. doi:10.2307/809925. hdl:2027/mdp.39015004075357. ISSN 0013-8274. JSTOR 809925.
- Dejnozka, Edward L.; Kapel, David E.; Gifford, Charles S.; Kapel, Marilyn B., eds. (1991). "Conant Report". American Educators' Encyclopedia (Rev. ed.). New York: Greenwood Press. ISBN 978-0-313-25269-3.
- Douglass, Harl R. (1959). "Review of The American High School Today: A First Report to Interested Citizens". The Annals of the American Academy of Political and Social Science. 325: 143–144. doi:10.1177/000271625932500141. ISSN 0002-7162. JSTOR 1034263.
- Hazard, Mary E. (1960). "Bargain Books". The Clearing House. 34 (6): 380. ISSN 0009-8655. JSTOR 30193653.
- Kelley, Marcelle (1966). "James Bryant Conant on Reading Disabilities". Bulletin of the Orton Society. 16: 90–91. ISSN 0474-7534. JSTOR 45124958.
- Koerner, James D. (1960). "The Tragedy of the Conant Report: A 'Personal Testament'". The Phi Delta Kappan. 42 (3): 121–124. ISSN 0031-7217. JSTOR 20342526.
- Pfeffer, J. Alan (1959). "Review of The American High School Today". The Modern Language Journal. 43 (5): 258. doi:10.2307/320929. hdl:2027/mdp.39015004075357. ISSN 0026-7902. JSTOR 320929.
- Pritchett, V. S. (1959). "Review of The American High School Today, Conant James B.". Scientific American. 201 (1): 168–170. ISSN 0036-8733. JSTOR 24940346.
- Robb, Felix C. (1963). "The Academic Preparation of Teachers: Conant's Proposals". Science. 141 (3586): 1166–1168. ISSN 0036-8075. JSTOR 1711535.
- Waldrop, Kelly; Berlioz, Esther Claros; Larrick, Peggy; Murray, Don C.; Moyer, M. A.; Poetter, Thomas S., eds. (2019). Curriculum Windows: What Curriculum Theorists of the 1950s Can Teach Us About Schools and Society Today. IAP. p. 24. ISBN 978-1-64113-820-8.
- Wolfle, Dael (1959). "Review of The American High School Today. A First Report to Interested Citizens; An Essay on Quality in Public Education". Science. 129 (3346): 382. ISSN 0036-8075. JSTOR 1758223.
