= Barbara Knowles Debs =

American art historian (born 1931)

8th President of Manhattanville College
- In office 1975–1985
- Preceded by: Harold Delaney
- Succeeded by: Jane C. Maggin

President of the New-York Historical Society
- In office 1989–1992
- Preceded by: James B. Bell
- Succeeded by: Norman Pearlstine

Personal details
- Born: Barbara Jean Knowles; 1931 (age 94–95)
- Spouse: Richard A. Debs
- Children: Elizabeth Anderson Debs and Nicholas Debs
- Education: Harvard University, Ph.D.

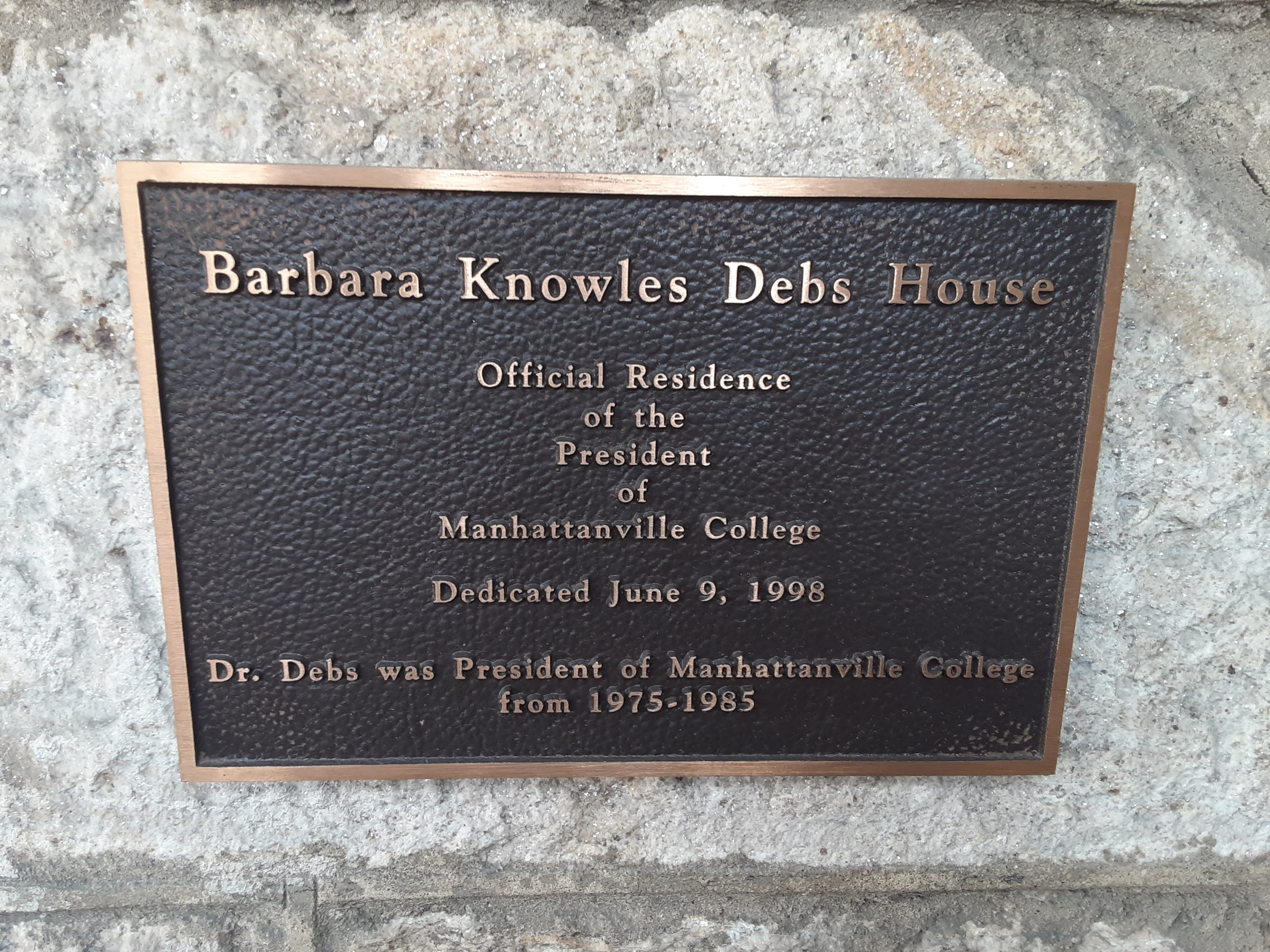
The former President's House at Manhattanville University is named in her honor.

Barbara Knowles Debs (born 1931) is an American art historian who was the president of Manhattanville College from 1975 to 1985. She was the president of the New-York Historical Society from 1989 to 1992. She is on the board of directors of the Brooklyn Museum of Art, the Foreign Policy Association and the Geraldine Rockefeller Dodge Foundation.

== Biography ==
Barbara Jean Knowles was born in 1931 to Stanley Freeman Knowles of Cranston, Rhode Island. In 1953 she was a Fulbright scholar to Italy. She studied art history in both Pisa and Rome, She then earned her Ph.D. from Harvard University.

On July 20, 1958 she married Richard A. Debs in Orleans, Massachusetts. They have a daughter, Elizabeth Anderson Debs.

By 1971 she was an assistant professor of art history at Manhattanville College. She was named president of the college in 1975 and she served until 1985. She was named president of the New-York Historical Society in 1989 and served until 1992. In 1995 she and her husband endowed the Richard and Barbara Debs Composer's Chair at Carnegie Hall.

She was awarded the Fulbright Lifetime Achievement Medal in 2002.

== Publications ==
- Sebastiano Del Piombo, the Venetian Works (1967)
