= Samuel M. McElvain =

American chemist (1897–1973)

- Born: December 9, 1897; DuQuoin, Illinois, United States
- Died: April 11, 1973 (aged 75)
- Education: Washington University in St. Louis; University of Illinois
- Scientific career
- Workplaces: University of Wisconsin–Madison
- Doctoral advisor: Roger Adams
- Doctoral students: Arthur C. Cope, C. Frederick Koelsch, Gilbert J. Stork

Samuel Marion McElvain (December 9, 1897 – April 11, 1973) was an American organic and synthetic chemist who spent his research career on the faculty of the University of Wisconsin.

== Academic career ==
McElvain studied first at Washington University in St. Louis and received his MS and Ph.D from the University of Illinois in 1923. In 1923, he became professor at the University of Wisconsin–Madison, from which he retired and became professor emeritus in 1961.

== Research ==
McElvain was known for his research on the mechanism of the Claisen condensation and on the chemistry of ketene acetals. He also had an interest in the pharmacology of cocaine and other compounds of interest as local anesthetics, prompting basic research in the chemistry of piperidines and pyridines as well as a long-term pharmaceutical industry collaboration with Eli Lilly and Company.

McElvain chaired the organic division of the American Chemical Society in 1945-6 and served on the editorial board of the Journal of the American Chemical Society for ten years, from 1946-56. He was elected to the United States National Academy of Sciences in 1949.
