= Fulbright Association =

Nonprofit organization

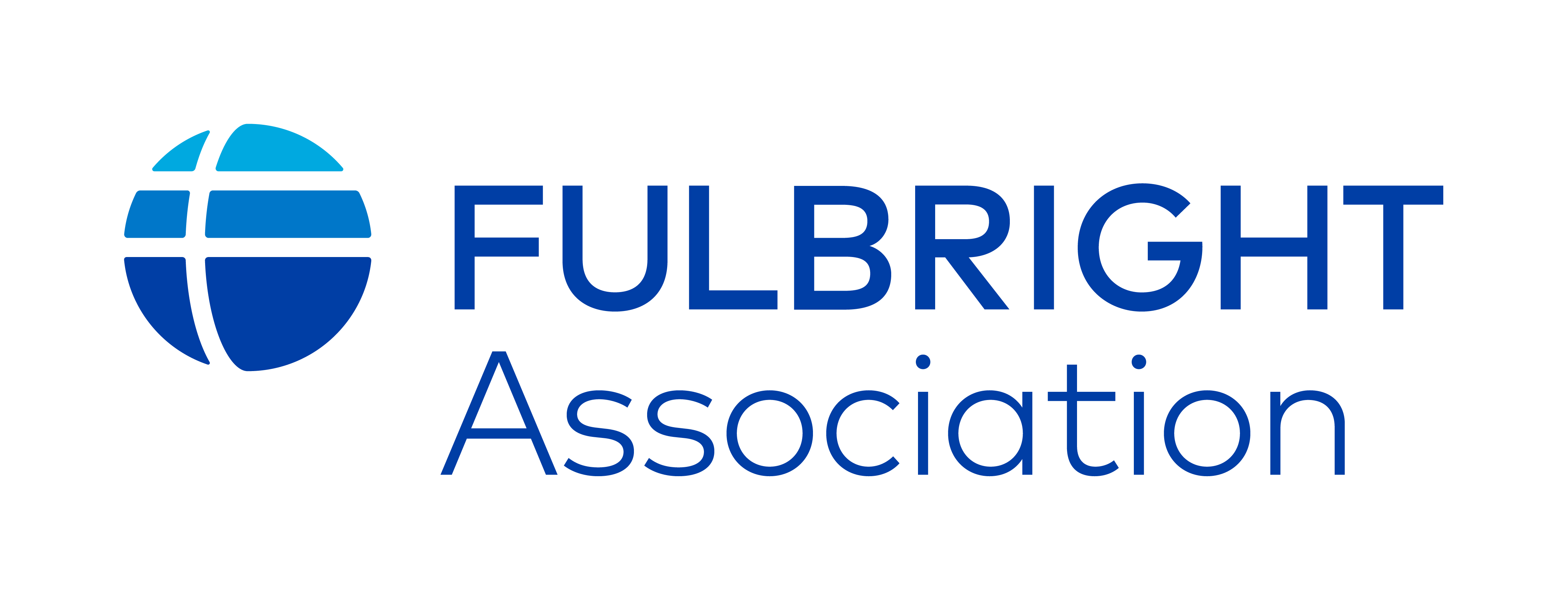
- Formation: February 27, 1977; 49 years ago
- Type: NGO
- Legal status: foundation
- Headquarters: 1730 Rhode Island Avenue NW, Suite 404 Washington DC, 20036
- Members: ~10,000
- Website: www.fulbright.org

The Fulbright Association is an American 501(c)(3) non-profit organization whose members are Fulbright Program alumni and friends of international education. Established on February 27, 1977, the association supports and promotes international educational and cultural exchange and the ideal most associated with the Fulbright name—mutual understanding among the peoples of the world.

== History ==
The Fulbright Association engages current and former Fulbright exchange participants in lifelong experiences that advance international understanding through volunteer service to communities, people-to-people diplomacy, and dialogue on global issues. Fulbright Association members form the active constituency for Fulbright exchanges to ensure that they continue to benefit future generations.

The association has led to the development of similar membership associations across the globe. The U.S. Fulbright Association's interest and ability to further a global network of Fulbright alumni associations was formally recognized in 1983 by the executive directors of Fulbright Commissions in Europe and Israel in the following resolution: "We recognize that the experience and support of former Fulbrighters can help to maintain the high quality of the Fulbright Program in the future; we shall assist the formation and activities of Fulbright alumni within our respective countries; and we shall encourage their cooperation with the Fulbright Alumni Association of the United States of America." The Fulbright Association also conducts outreach in local communities and classrooms in the U.S., and hosts an annual conference.

== Membership ==
The Fulbright Association currently has approximately 10,000 individual members. About one-third of these are life members. To facilitate interaction and discussion on global issues, the association has launched an online community for Fulbright alumni and has increased the functionality of that network with a redesigned web site. Approximately 230 institutional members support the Fulbright Association. These include colleges, universities, and international educational organizations throughout the country. Our 50 local chapter affiliates hold programs for visiting Fulbrighters and alumni throughout the country. The Fulbright Association connects to 70 independent Fulbright Associations in other countries.

== Programs ==
=== The Fulbright Prize for International Understanding ===
The J. William Fulbright Prize for International Understanding, established in 1993, is awarded by the Fulbright Association to recognize individuals who have made extraordinary contributions toward bringing peoples, cultures, or nations to greater understanding of others. To communicate the importance of the Fulbright Program, the association developed three signature events. In October 1993, the association awarded the inaugural prize to former South African President Nelson R. Mandela in a ceremony at the U.S. Department of State. The Fulbright Association has selected as Fulbright Prize laureates four world leaders—Nelson Mandela, Jimmy Carter, Kofi Annan, and Martti Ahtisaari—before they were named Nobel Peace Prize laureates. The Coca-Cola Foundation co-sponsored the Fulbright Prize from 1993-2008 and contributed to the Prize Endowment initiative begun under the chairmanship of the late John B. Hurford, Fulbright scholar to India. In 1993, the Fulbright Association also held the first special event benefit in its history, an 88th Birthday Tribute to Senator Fulbright. The benefit involved President Bill Clinton and First Lady Hillary Rodham Clinton in paying tribute to Senator Fulbright through the award of the Presidential Medal of Freedom.

| Award Winner | Year | Country |
|---|---|---|
| Nelson Mandela | 1993 | South Africa |
| Jimmy Carter | 1994 | United States |
| Franz Vranitzky | 1995 | Austria |
| Corazon Aquino | 1996 | Philippines |
| Václav Havel | 1997 | Czech Republic |
| Patricio Aylwin | 1998 | Chile |
| Mary Robinson | 1999 | Ireland |
| Martti Ahtisaari | 2000 | Finland |
| Kofi Annan | 2001 | Ghana |
| Sadako Ogata | 2002 | Japan |
| Fernando Henrique Cardoso | 2003 | Brazil |
| Colin Powell | 2004 | United States |
| Bill Clinton | 2006 | United States |
| Desmond Tutu | 2008 | South Africa |
| Bill Gates and Melinda French Gates | 2010 | United States |
| Médecins Sans Frontières | 2012 | France |
| Hans Blix | 2014 | Sweden |
| Richard Lugar | 2016 | United States |
| Angela Merkel | 2018 | Germany |
| Bono | 2021 | Ireland |
| Kizzmekia Corbett and Anthony Fauci | 2022 | United States |
| Gary White, Matt Damon | 2024 | United States |
| Christiane Amanpour | 2025 | United Kingdom |

=== Lifetime Achievement Award ===
The first Fulbright Lifetime Achievement Medals were awarded in 2000 to Fulbright alumni Arlene Alda, Barbara Knowles Debs, and Richard A. Debs. The Fulbright Lifetime Achievement Medal honors Fulbright alumni whose distinguished careers and civic and cultural contributions seek to expand the boundaries of human wisdom, empathy, and perception. Recipients of the Medal show exemplary commitments to creative leadership and liberal education.

=== Selma Jeanne Cohen Fund Lecture ===
The Selma Jeanne Cohen Fund Lecture for International Scholarship on Dance was created through a generous bequest by the late dance scholar and historian Dr. Selma Jeanne Cohen, who was a Fulbright scholar in Russia in 1976. The Fulbright Association administers the endowed Selma Jeanne Cohen Fund lecture, a presentation at the association's annual conference about previously unpublished research in dance history or other areas of dance scholarship. With annual funding for the past 15 years from the U. S. Department of State, the association has awarded funds to chapters to provide more than 150 local enrichment events and activities annually for Fulbright visiting students, teachers and scholars from abroad. These funds have also supported chapter mentoring and Fulbright Program outreach efforts. In 2004, the Fulbright Association responded to requests of international alumni to hold annual conferences outside the United States.

== Annual conference ==
The association holds its annual conference abroad in even years and in the United States in odd years. International conferences have been held in Athens (2004), Morocco (2006), Beijing (2008), Buenos Aires (2010), London (2012) and Puebla, Mexico (2018). Subsequent COVID-19 pandemic-era meetings were held virtually, in 2020 and 2021. In-person meetings were resumed in Bethesda, Maryland (2022).

== See also ==
- Fulbright Program
