= James B. Conant =

American chemist (1893–1978)

James B. Conant ForMemRS
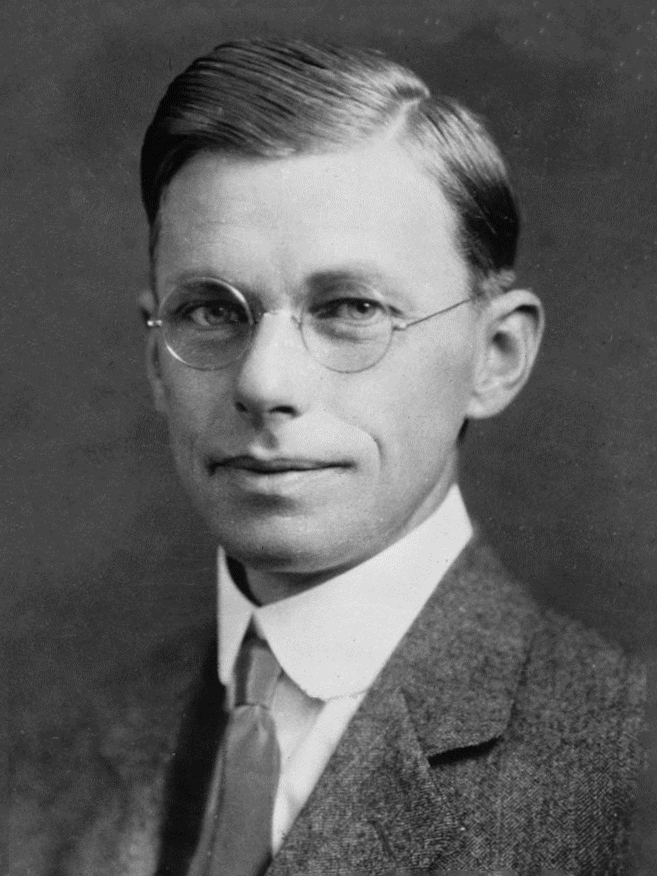
- Conant in 1932

1st United States Ambassador to West Germany
- In office May 14, 1955 – February 19, 1957
- President: Dwight D. Eisenhower
- Preceded by: Leland B. Morris (as chargé d'affaires, 1941)
- Succeeded by: David K. E. Bruce

23rd President of Harvard University
- In office October 9, 1933 – 1953
- Preceded by: Abbott Lawrence Lowell
- Succeeded by: Nathan Marsh Pusey

Personal details
- Born: James Bryant Conant; March 26, 1893 Dorchester, Massachusetts, U.S.
- Died: February 11, 1978 (aged 84) Hanover, New Hampshire, U.S.
- Spouse: Patty Thayer Richards (m. 1920)
- Relations: Conant family
- Children: 2
- Education: Harvard University (AB, PhD)
- Awards: American Institute of Chemists Gold Medal (1934); Commandeur, Légion d'honneur (1936); Benjamin Franklin Medal (1943); Priestley Medal (1944); Medal for Merit (1946); Kentucky colonel (1946); Honorary Commander of the Order of the British Empire (1948); Grand Cross of the Order of Merit of the Federal Republic of Germany (1957); Presidential Medal of Freedom with Distinction (1963); Sylvanus Thayer Award (1965); Clark Kerr Medal (1977); Fellow of the Royal Society
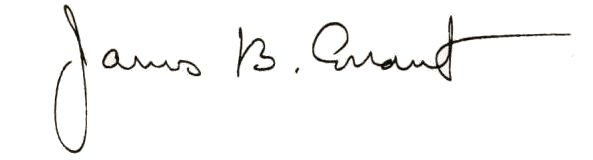
- Signature

Military service
- Allegiance: United States
- Branch/service: Chemical Warfare Service
- Years of service: 1917–1919
- Rank: Major
- Battles/wars: World War I

James Bryant Conant (/ˈkoʊnənt/; March 26, 1893 – February 11, 1978) was an American chemist, a president of Harvard University, and the first U.S. ambassador to West Germany.

During World War I, he served in the U.S. Army, where he worked on the development of poison gases, especially lewisite. He became an assistant professor of chemistry at Harvard University in 1919 and the Sheldon Emery Professor of Organic Chemistry in 1929. He researched the physical structures of natural products, particularly chlorophyll, and he was one of the first to explore the sometimes complex relationship between chemical equilibrium and the reaction rate of chemical processes. He studied the biochemistry of oxyhemoglobin providing insight into the disease methemoglobinemia, helped to explain the structure of chlorophyll, and contributed important insights that underlie modern theories of acid-base chemistry.

In 1933, Conant became the president of Harvard University with a reformist agenda that included dispensing with a number of customs, including class rankings and the requirement for Latin classes. He abolished athletic scholarships, and instituted an "up or out" policy, under which untenured faculty who were not promoted were terminated. His egalitarian vision of education required a diversified student body, and he promoted the adoption of the Scholastic Aptitude Test (SAT) and co-educational classes. During his presidency, women were admitted to Harvard Medical School and Harvard Law School for the first time.

Conant was appointed to the National Defense Research Committee (NDRC) in 1940, becoming its chairman in 1941. In this capacity, he oversaw vital wartime research projects, including the development of synthetic rubber and the Manhattan Project, which developed the first atomic bombs. On July 16, 1945, he was among the dignitaries present at the Alamogordo Bombing and Gunnery Range for the Trinity nuclear test, the first detonation of an atomic bomb, and was part of the Interim Committee that advised President Harry S. Truman to use atomic bombs on Japan. After the war, he served on the Joint Research and Development Board (JRDC) that was established to coordinate burgeoning defense research, and on the influential General Advisory Committee (GAC) of the Atomic Energy Commission (AEC); in the latter capacity he advised the president against starting a development program for the hydrogen bomb.

In his later years at Harvard, Conant taught undergraduate courses on the history and philosophy of science, and wrote books explaining the scientific method to laymen. In 1953, he retired as president of Harvard University and became the United States High Commissioner for Germany, overseeing the restoration of German sovereignty after World War II, and then was Ambassador to West Germany until 1957. On returning to the United States, Conant criticized the education system in The American High School Today (1959), Slums and Suburbs (1961), and The Education of American Teachers (1963). Between 1965 and 1969, Conant authored his autobiography, My Several Lives (1970). He became increasingly infirm, had a series of strokes in 1977, and died in a nursing home in Hanover, New Hampshire, the following year.

== Early life and education ==
Conant was born in Dorchester, Massachusetts, on March 26, 1893, the third child and only son of James Scott Conant, a photoengraver, and his wife Jennett Orr (née Bryant). In 1904, Conant was one of 35 boys who passed the competitive admission exam for the Roxbury Latin School, graduating near the top of his class in 1910.

Encouraged by his science teacher, Newton H. Black, in September of that year he entered Harvard College, where he studied physical chemistry under Theodore W. Richards and organic chemistry under Elmer P. Kohler. He was also an editor of The Harvard Crimson. He joined the Signet Society and Delta Upsilon, and was initiated as a brother of the Omicron chapter of Alpha Chi Sigma in 1912. He graduated Phi Beta Kappa with his Bachelor of Arts in June 1913. He then went to work on his doctorate, which was an unusual double dissertation. The first part, supervised by Richards, concerned "The Electrochemical Behavior of Liquid Sodium Amalgams"; the second, supervised by Kohler, was "A Study of Certain Cyclopropane Derivatives". Harvard awarded Conant his Doctor of Philosophy degree in 1916.

== Career ==
In 1915, Conant entered into a business partnership with two other Harvard chemistry graduates, Stanley Pennock and Chauncey Loomis, to form the LPC Laboratories. They opened a plant in a one-story building in Queens, New York City, where they manufactured chemicals used by the pharmaceutical industry like benzoic acid that were selling at high prices on account of the interruption of imports from Germany due to World War I. In 1916, the departure of organic chemist Roger Adams created a vacancy at Harvard that was offered to Conant. Since he aspired to an academic career, Conant accepted the offer and returned to Harvard. On November 27, 1916, an explosion killed Pennock and two others and completely destroyed a subsequent and newly opened plant in Newark, New Jersey. A contributing cause was Conant's faulty test procedures.

=== U.S. Army ===
Following the United States declaration of war on Germany that launched U.S. involvement in World War I, Conant was commissioned as a second lieutenant in the U.S. Army Sanitary Corps on September 22, 1917. He went to the Camp American University, where he worked on the development of poison gases. Initially, his work concentrated on mustard gas, but in May 1918, Conant took charge of a unit concerned with the development of lewisite. He was promoted to major on July 20, 1918. A pilot plant was built, and then a full-scale production plant in Cleveland, but the war ended before lewisite could be used in battle.

=== Harvard University professor ===
Conant was appointed an assistant professor of chemistry at Harvard in 1919. The following year he became engaged to Richards's daughter, Grace (Patty) Thayer Richards. They were married in the Appleton Chapel at Harvard on April 17, 1920, and had two sons, James Richards Conant, born in May 1923, and Theodore Richards Conant, born in July 1928.

Conant became an associate professor in 1924. In 1925, he visited Germany, then the heart of chemical research, for eight months. He toured the major universities and laboratories there and met many of the leading chemists, including Theodor Curtius, Kazimierz Fajans, Hans Fischer, Arthur Hantzsch, Hans Meerwein, Jakob Meisenheimer, Hermann Staudinger, Adolf Windaus and Karl Ziegler. After Conant returned to the United States, Arthur Amos Noyes made him an attractive offer to move to Caltech. The president of Harvard, Abbott Lawrence Lowell, made a counter offer: immediate promotion to professor, effective September 1, 1927, with a salary of $7,000 (roughly equivalent to US$129,741 as of 2025) and a grant of $9,000 per annum for research. Conant accepted and stayed at Harvard. In 1929, he became the Sheldon Emery Professor of Organic Chemistry, and then, in 1931, the chairman of the chemistry department.

Between 1928 and 1933, Conant published 55 papers. Much of his research, like his double thesis, combined natural product chemistry with physical organic chemistry. Based on his exploration of reaction rates in chemical equilibria, Conant was one of the first to recognize that the kinetics of these systems is sometimes straightforward and simple, yet quite complex in other cases. Conant studied the effect of haloalkane structure on the rate of substitution with inorganic iodide salts which, together with earlier work, led to what is now known as either the Conant-Finkelstein reaction or more commonly simply the Finkelstein reaction. A recent application of this reaction involved the preparation of an iodinated polyvinyl chloride from regular PVC. A combination of Conant's work on the kinetics of hydrogenation and George Kistiakowsky's work on the enthalpy changes of these reactions supported the later development of the theory of hyperconjugation.

Conant's investigations helped in the development of a more comprehensive understanding of the nature of acids and bases. He investigated the properties of certain acids which were many times stronger than mineral acid solutions in water. Conant christened them "superacids" and laid the foundation for the development of the Hammett acidity function. These investigations used acetic acid as the solvent and demonstrated that sodium acetate behaves as a base under these conditions. This observation is consistent with Brønsted–Lowry acid–base theory published in 1923, but cannot be explained under older Arrhenius theory approaches. Later work with George Wheland and extended by William Kirk McEwen looked at the properties of hydrocarbons as very weak acids, including acetophenone, phenylacetylene, fluorene and diphenylmethane. Conant can be considered alongside Brønsted, Lowry, Lewis, and Hammett as a developer of modern understanding of acids and bases.

Between 1929 and his retirement from chemical research in 1933, Conant published papers in Science, Nature, and the Journal of the American Chemical Society about chlorophyll and its structure. Though the complete structure eluded him, his work did support and contribute to Nobel laureate Hans Fischer's ultimate determination of the structure in 1939. Conant's work on chlorophyll was recognized when he was inducted as a foreign Fellow of the Royal Society on May 2, 1941. He also published three papers describing the polymerization of isoprene to prepare synthetic rubber.

Another line of research involved the biochemistry of the hemoglobin-oxyhemoglobin system. Conant ran a series of experiments with electrochemical oxidation and reduction, following in the footsteps of the famous German chemist and Nobel laureate Fritz Haber. He determined that the iron center in methemoglobin is a ferric (Fe^{III}) center, unlike the ferrous (Fe^{II}) center found in normal hemoglobin, and this difference in oxidation state is the cause of methemoglobinemia, a medical condition which causes tissue hypoxia.

Conant wrote a chemistry textbook with his former science teacher Black, entitled Practical Chemistry, which was published in 1920, with a revised edition in 1929. This was superseded in 1937 by their New Practical Chemistry, which in turn had a revised edition in 1946. The text proved a popular one; it was adopted by 75 universities, and Conant received thousands of dollars in royalties. For his accomplishments in chemistry, he was awarded the American Chemical Society's Nichols Medal in 1932, Columbia University's Chandler Medal in 1932, and the American Chemical Society's highest honor, the Priestley Medal, in 1944. He also received the society's Charles Lathrop Parsons Award in 1955, for public service. He was elected a Fellow of the American Academy of Arts and Sciences in 1924, a Member of the National Academy of Sciences in 1929, and a Member of the American Philosophical Society in 1935. Notable students of Conant's included Paul Doughty Bartlett, George Wheland, and Frank Westheimer. In 1932 he was also honored by membership of the German Academy of Sciences Leopoldina.

=== Harvard University president ===
After some months of lobbying and discussion, Harvard's ruling body, the Harvard Corporation, announced on May 8, 1933, that it had elected Conant as the next President of Harvard. Alfred North Whitehead, Harvard's eminent professor of philosophy disagreed with the decision, declaring, "The Corporation should not have elected a chemist to the Presidency." "But," Corporation member Grenville Clark reminded him, "Eliot was a chemist, and our best president too." "I know," replied Whitehead, "but Eliot was a bad chemist." Clark was very much responsible for Conant's election.

On October 9, 1933, Conant became the President of Harvard University with a low-key installation ceremony in the Faculty Room of University Hall. This set the tone for Conant's presidency as one of informality and reform. At his inauguration, he accepted the charter and seal presented to John Leverett the Younger in 1707, but dropped a number of other customs, including the singing of Gloria Patri and the Latin Oration. While, unlike some other universities, Harvard did not require Greek or Latin for entrance, they were worth double credits towards admission, and students like Conant who had studied Latin were awarded an A.B. degree while those who had not, received an S.B. One of his first efforts at reform was to attempt to abolish this distinction. But in 1937 he wrote:

I do not see how one can make very much headway as a student ... of history and literature without a reading knowledge of Latin. I do not see how a person can go very far in any branch of science without a thorough understanding of mathematics, and if the underpinning was bad in school, probably the necessary calculus and so forth would not have been taken during the college years. I know that a man cannot be a research chemist without a reading knowledge of German. It is hard to acquire it as the first language in college.

As a first step to improving the faculty, Conant established a mandatory retirement age of sixty-six, with exceptional faculty members able to remain until age seventy-six. The latter affected two of the university's most eminent scholars, Frank Taussig and George Kittredge, who were persuaded to retire voluntarily rather than under the new rule. His longest and most bitter battle was over tenure reform, shifting to an "up or out" policy, under which scholars who were not promoted were terminated. A small number of extra-departmental positions was set aside for outstanding scholars. This policy led junior faculty to revolt, and nearly resulted in Conant's dismissal in 1938. Conant was fond of saying: "Behold the turtle. It makes progress only when it sticks its neck out."

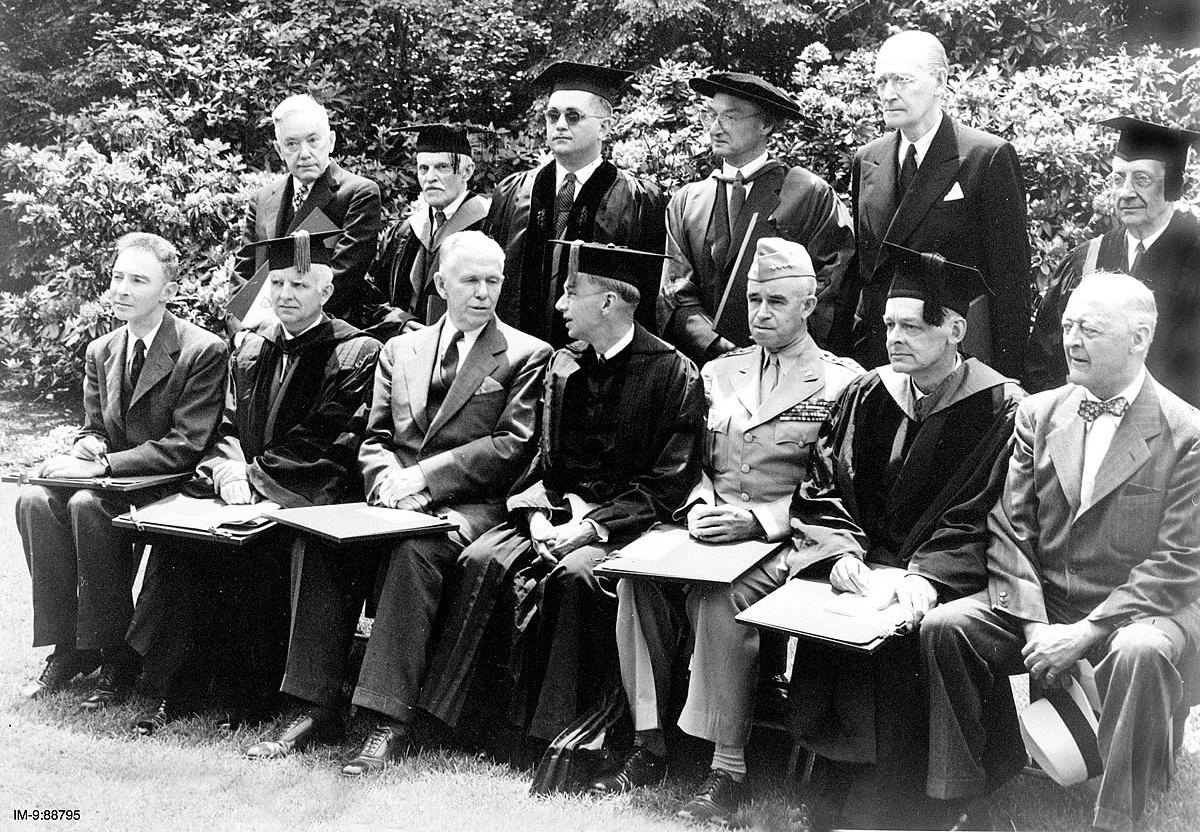
Honorary degrees recipients pose at the 1947 Harvard University commencement in Cambridge, Massachusetts, June 5, 1947. Front row (left to right): Robert Oppenheimer, Ernest Cadman Collwell, George C. Marshall, President James B. Conant of Harvard, Omar N. Bradley, T.S. Eliot and James Wadsworth. Back row (left to right): William Addison Dwiggins, George Henry Chase, William Hodding Carter Jr, Ivor Armstrong Richards, William F Gibbs and Frank L Boyden.

Other reforms included the abolition of class rankings and athletic scholarships. Conant added new graduate degrees in education, history of science and public policy, and he introduced the Nieman Fellowship for journalists to study at Harvard, the first of which was awarded in 1939. He supported the "meatballs", as lower class students were called. He instituted the Harvard national scholarships for underprivileged students. Dudley House was opened to provide non-resident students with increased opportunities for socialization (opportunities provided to resident undergraduates by the twelve Harvard College residential houses).

Conant asked two of his assistant deans, Henry Chauncey and William Bender, to determine whether the Scholastic Aptitude Test (SAT) was a good measure of academic potential. When they reported that it was, Conant adopted it. He waged a ten-year campaign for the consolidation of testing services, which resulted in the creation of the Educational Testing Service in 1946, with Chauncey as its director. Theodore H. White, a Boston Jewish "meatball" who received a personal letter of introduction from Conant so that he could report on the Chinese Civil War, noted that "Conant was the first president to recognize that meatballs were Harvard men too." Lowell, Conant's predecessor, had imposed a 15 percent quota on Jewish students in 1922, something Conant had voted to support.

This quota was replaced with geographic distribution preferences, which had the same effect of limiting Jewish admission. Conant's cool response to the plight of the Jewish academic refugees from Hitler suggests that he shared the anti-semitism common to his social group and time. When DuPont asked him for an appraisal of the German chemist Max Bergmann, Conant wrote back that Bergmann was "definitely of the Jewish type—rather heavy" with "none of the earmarks of genius". Harvard awarded honorary degrees to two notable displaced scholars, Thomas Mann and Albert Einstein, in 1935, but Conant declined to participate in the Emergency Committee in Aid of Displaced German Scholars. His vision of building Harvard's faculty involved hiring promising American scholars rather than helping refugees. The two most prominent refugee scholars at Harvard, Walter Gropius and Robert Ulich, were not Jewish. Writing in 1979, historian William M. Tuttle Jr. concluded that "Conant's position reflected not only a failure of foresight, but also a failure of compassion and political sensitivity", but added that "Conant was one of the more outspoken anti-Nazis in the United States from 1933 to the outbreak of war in Europe in 1939. Stephen H. Norwood, writing in 2004, observed that "This, however, was hardly the case." Norwood noted that while Conant was not an apologist for the Nazi regime, he repeatedly failed to speak out.

In 1934, Harvard-educated German businessman Ernst Hanfstaengl attended the 25th anniversary reunion of his class of 1909, and gave a number of speeches. In his inaugural commencement address in 1934, Conant spoke out against the Nazi threat to academic freedom in Germany. His speech was interrupted by two female students who had chained themselves to the stands near the speaker's platform and chanted "Down with Hitler!" and "Down with Hanfstaengl!" Hanfstaengl wrote out a check for 2,500 ℛ︁ℳ︁ (equivalent to $250,000 in 2025) to Conant for a scholarship to enable an outstanding Harvard student to study for a year in Germany. At the next meeting of the Corporation in October, Conant persuaded it to reject the offer due to Hanfstaengl's Nazi associations. When the issue of Hanfstaengl's scholarship came up again in 1936, Conant turned the money down a second time. Hanfstaengl's presence on campus prompted a series of anti-Nazi demonstrations, in which a number of Harvard and MIT students were arrested. Conant made a personal plea for clemency that resulted in two women being acquitted, but six men and a woman were sentenced to six months in jail. They were later pardoned by the Governor of Massachusetts, Joseph B. Ely.

When the University of Berlin awarded an honorary degree in 1934 to American legal scholar and Dean of Harvard Law School Roscoe Pound, who had toured Germany earlier that year and made no secret of his admiration for the Nazi regime, Conant refused to order Pound not to accept it, and attended the informal award ceremony at Harvard where Pound was presented with the degree by Hans Luther, the German ambassador to the United States.

What Conant feared most was disruption to Harvard's tercentennial celebrations in 1936, but there was no trouble despite the presence of Franklin D. Roosevelt, the President of the United States, and a Harvard graduate of the class of 1904, whom many fellow Harvard graduates regarded as a socialist and a class traitor. Privately, Conant approved of the New Deal and expressed admiration for Roosevelt's goals. He invited Roosevelt to speak at the tercentennial celebrations. This did not sit well with Lowell, and it was only with difficulty that Lowell was persuaded to be presiding officer at an event at which Roosevelt spoke. The parallels between Roosevelt's New Deal and Conant's advocacy of meritocracy and of education as a means of social mobility did not escape notice. Conant recognized that education in America contributed to social stratification rather than breaking it down, and that educational opportunity needed to be extended to areas where it was deficient, such as rural areas, small towns and inner cities. He advocated for federal interventions, since these areas were often poor and lacking in the funds needed to improve education, and that they were economically and socially stratified with political and taxation structures that reinforced social stratification.

Conant sought to enhance the liberal education of Harvard students. He toyed with the notion of requiring PhD candidates to study an area outside their specialty. One obstacle was the organization of faculty into specialized departments that had little contact with each other. In 1935, he attempted to break down the specialization of academic by creating non-departmental university professorships for scholars whose research crossed the boundaries of multiple disciplines. Undergraduates were required to take general education courses, of which a proportion had to be outside their area of concentration. He took a particular interest in establishing a history of science graduate program and a history of science course for nonscientists.

Although he had no daughters and little interest in the education of women, the exigencies of World War II meant reduced numbers of male students, and this propelled Conant in that direction. In June 1943, he concluded an agreement with Radcliffe College, the women's college associated with Harvard, for Harvard's Faculty of Arts and Sciences to assume responsibility for the instruction of Radcliffe students. Initially there were separate but identical undergraduate courses for Harvard and Radcliffe students, but this gave way to coeducational classes. It was during his presidency that the first class of women were admitted to Harvard Medical School in 1945, and Harvard Law School in 1950.

=== National Defense Research Committee ===
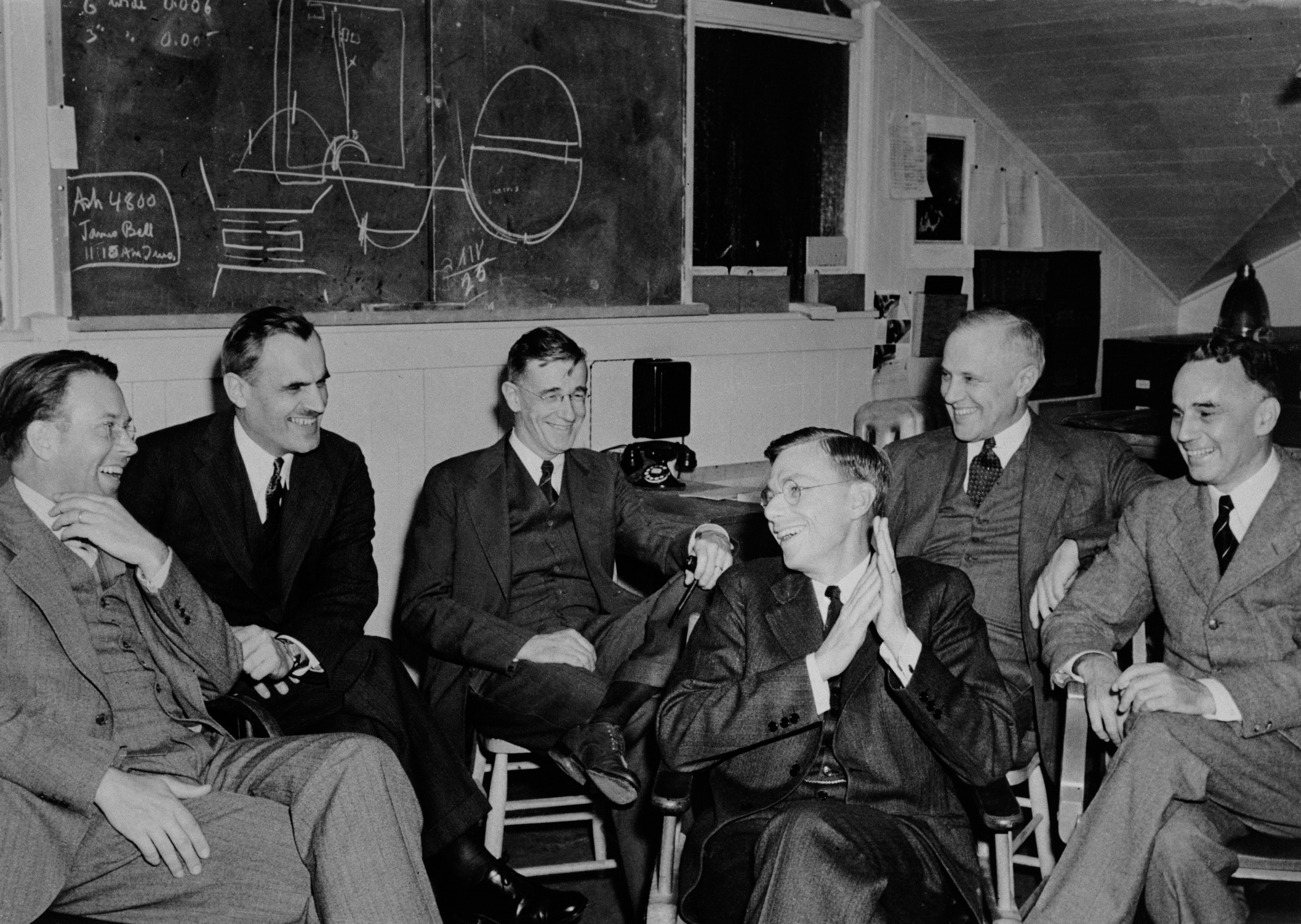
Ernest O. Lawrence, Arthur H. Compton, Vannevar Bush, Conant, Karl T. Compton, and Alfred L. Loomis at the University of California, Berkeley in 1940

In June 1940, with World War II already raging in Europe, Vannevar Bush, the director of the Carnegie Institution of Washington, recruited Conant to the National Defense Research Committee (NDRC), although he remained president of Harvard. Bush envisaged the NDRC as bringing scientists together to "conduct research for the creation and improvement of instrumentalities, methods and materials of warfare." Although the United States had not yet entered the war, Conant was not alone in his conviction that Nazi Germany had to be stopped, and that the United States would inevitably become embroiled in the conflict. The immediate task, as Conant saw it, was therefore to organize American science for war. He became head of the NDRC's Division B, the division responsible for bombs, fuels, gases and chemicals. On June 28, 1941, Roosevelt signed Executive Order 8807, which created the Office of Scientific Research and Development (OSRD), with Bush as its director. Conant succeeded Bush as chairman of the NDRC, which was subsumed into the OSRD. Roger Adams, a contemporary of Conant's at Harvard in the 1910s, succeeded him as head of Division B. Conant became the driving force of the NDRC on personnel and policy matters. The NDRC would work hand in hand with the Army and Navy's research efforts, supplementing rather than supplanting them. It was specifically charged with investigating nuclear fission.

In February 1941, Roosevelt sent Conant to Britain as head of a mission that also included Frederick L. Hovde from Purdue University and Carroll L. Wilson from MIT, to evaluate the research being carried out there and the prospects for cooperation. The 1940 Tizard Mission had revealed that American technology was some years behind that of Britain in many fields, most notably radar, and cooperation was eagerly sought. Conant had lunch with Prime Minister Winston Churchill and Frederick Lindemann, his leading scientific adviser, and an audience with King George VI at Buckingham Palace. At a subsequent meeting, Lindemann told Conant about British progress towards developing an atomic bomb. What most impressed Conant was the British conviction that it was feasible. That the British program was ahead of the American one raised the possibility in Conant's mind that the German nuclear energy project might be even further ahead, as Germany was generally acknowledged to be a world leader in nuclear physics. Later that year, Churchill, as Chancellor of the University of Bristol, conferred an honorary Doctor of Laws degree on Conant in absentia.

Conant subsequently moved to restrict cooperation with Britain on nuclear energy, particularly its post-war aspects, and became involved in heated negotiations with Wallace Akers, the representative of Tube Alloys, the British atomic project. Conant's tough stance, under which the British were excluded except where their assistance was vital, resulted in British retaliation, and a complete breakdown of cooperation. His objections were swept aside by Roosevelt, who brokered the 1943 Quebec Agreement with Churchill, that restored full cooperation. After the Quebec Conference, Churchill visited Conant at Harvard, where Conant returned the 1941 gesture and presented Churchill with an honorary Doctor of Laws degree. After the United States entered the war in December 1941, the OSRD handed the atomic bomb project, better known as the Manhattan Project, over to the Army, with Brigadier General Leslie R. Groves as project director. A meeting that included Conant decided Groves should be answerable to a small committee called the Military Policy Committee, chaired by Bush, with Conant as his alternate. Thus, Conant remained involved in the administration of the Manhattan Project at its highest levels.

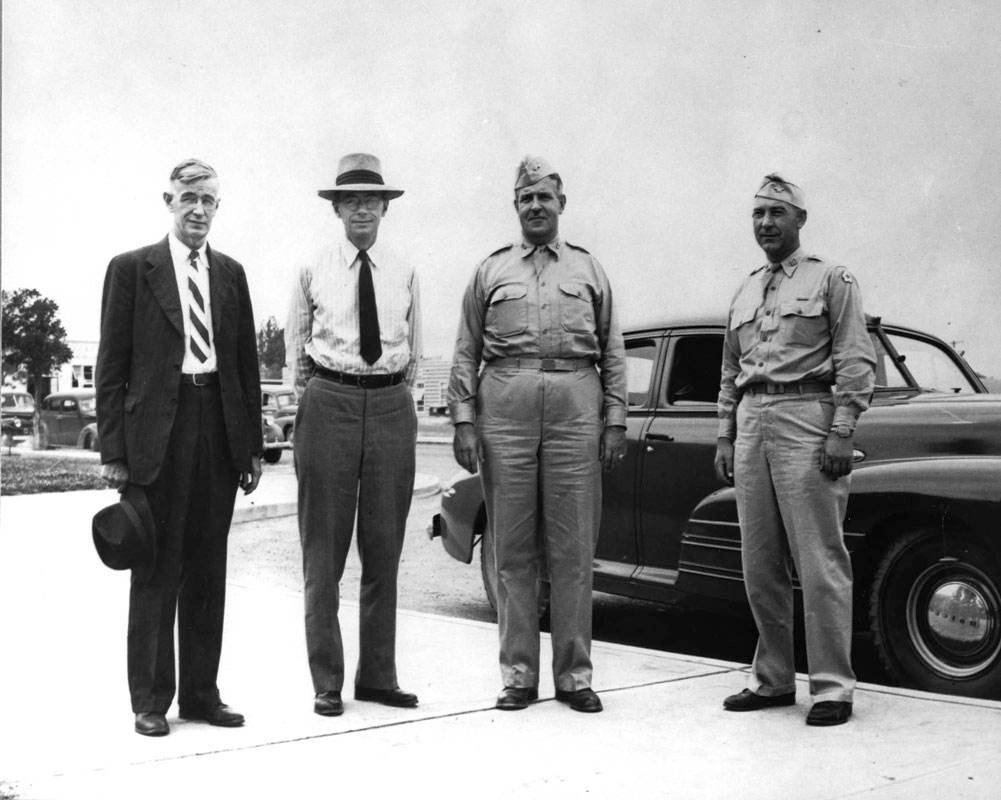
Vannevar Bush, Conant, Major General Leslie Groves and Colonel Franklin Matthias at the Hanford Engineer Works in July 1945

In August 1942, Roosevelt appointed Conant to the Rubber Survey Committee. Chaired by Bernard M. Baruch, a trusted adviser and confidant of Roosevelt, the committee was tasked with reviewing the synthetic rubber program. Corporations used patent laws to restrict competition and stifle innovation. When the Japanese occupation of Malaya, North Borneo and Sarawak, followed by the Japanese occupation of the Dutch East Indies, cut off 90 percent of the supply of natural rubber, the rubber shortage became a national scandal, and the development of synthetic substitutes, an urgent priority. Baruch dealt with the difficult political issues; Conant concerned himself with the technical ones. There were a number of different synthetic rubber products to choose from. In addition to DuPont's neoprene, Standard Oil had licensed German patents for a copolymer called Buna-N and a related product, Buna-S. None had been manufactured on the scale now required, and there was pressure from agricultural interests to choose a process which involved making raw materials from farm products. The Rubber Survey Committee made a series of recommendations, including the appointment of a rubber director, and the construction and operation of 51 factories to supply the materials needed for synthetic rubber production. Technical problems dogged the program through 1943, but by late 1944 plants were in operation with an annual capacity of over a million tons, most of which was Buna-S.

In May 1945, Conant became part of the Interim Committee that was formed to advise the new president, Harry S. Truman on nuclear weapons. The Interim Committee decided that the atomic bomb should be used against an industrial target in Japan as soon as possible and without warning. On July 16, 1945, Conant was among the dignitaries present at the Alamogordo Bombing and Gunnery Range for the Trinity nuclear test, the first detonation of an atomic bomb. After the war, Conant became concerned about growing criticism in the United States of the bombing of Hiroshima and Nagasaki by figures like Norman Cousins and Reinhold Niebuhr. He played an important behind-the-scenes role in shaping public opinion by instigating and then editing an influential February 1947 Harper's article entitled "The Decision to Use the Atomic Bomb". Written by former Secretary of War Henry L. Stimson with the help of McGeorge Bundy, the article stressed that the atomic bombings of Hiroshima and Nagasaki were used to avoid the possibility of "over a million casualties", from a figure found in the estimates given to the Joint Chiefs of Staff by its Joint Planning Staff in 1945.

=== Cold War ===
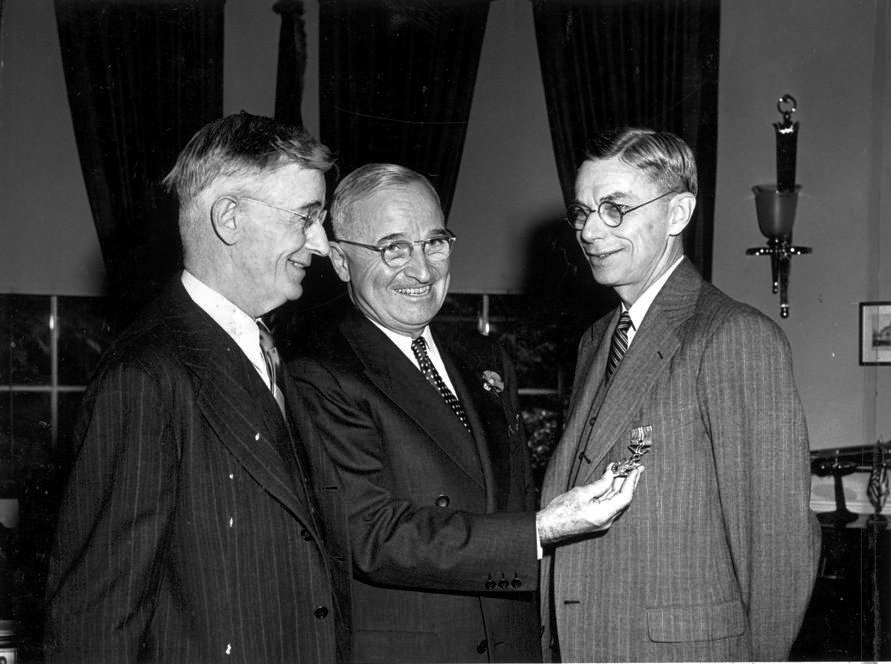
Vannevar Bush watches as U.S. President Harry S. Truman presents Conant with the civilian Medal for Merit (with bronze palm) in 1948.

The Atomic Energy Act of 1946 replaced the wartime Manhattan Project with the Atomic Energy Commission (AEC) on January 1, 1947. The Act also established the General Advisory Committee (GAC) within the AEC to provide it with scientific and technical advice. It was widely expected that Conant would chair the GAC, but the position went to Robert Oppenheimer, the wartime director of the Los Alamos National Laboratory that had designed and developed the first atomic bombs. At the same time, the Joint Research and Development Board (JRDC) was established to coordinate defense research, and Bush asked Conant to head its atomic energy subcommittee, on which Oppenheimer also served. When the new AEC chairman David E. Lilienthal raised security concerns about Oppenheimer's relationships with communists, including Oppenheimer's brother Frank Oppenheimer, his wife Kitty and his former girlfriend Jean Tatlock, Bush and Conant reassured Lilienthal that they had known about it when they had placed Oppenheimer in charge at Los Alamos in 1942. With such expressions of support, AEC issued Oppenheimer a Q clearance, granting him access to atomic secrets.

By September 1948, the Red Scare began to take hold, and Conant called for a ban on hiring teachers who were communists, although not for the dismissal of those who had already been hired. A debate ensued over whether communist educators could teach apolitical subjects. Conant was a member of the Educational Policies Commission (EPC), a body to which he had been appointed in 1941. When it next met in March 1949, Conant's push for a ban was supported by the president of Columbia University, General of the Army Dwight D. Eisenhower. The two found common ground in their belief in ideology-based education, which Conant called "democratic education". He did not see public education as a side effect of American democracy, but as one of its principal driving forces, and he disapproved of the public funding of denominational schools that he observed in Australia during his visit there in 1951. He called for increased federal spending on education, and higher taxes to redistribute wealth. His thinking was outlined in his books Education in a Divided World in 1948, and Education and Liberty in 1951. In 1952, he went further and endorsed the dismissal of academics who invoked the Fifth under questioning by the House Un-American Activities Committee.

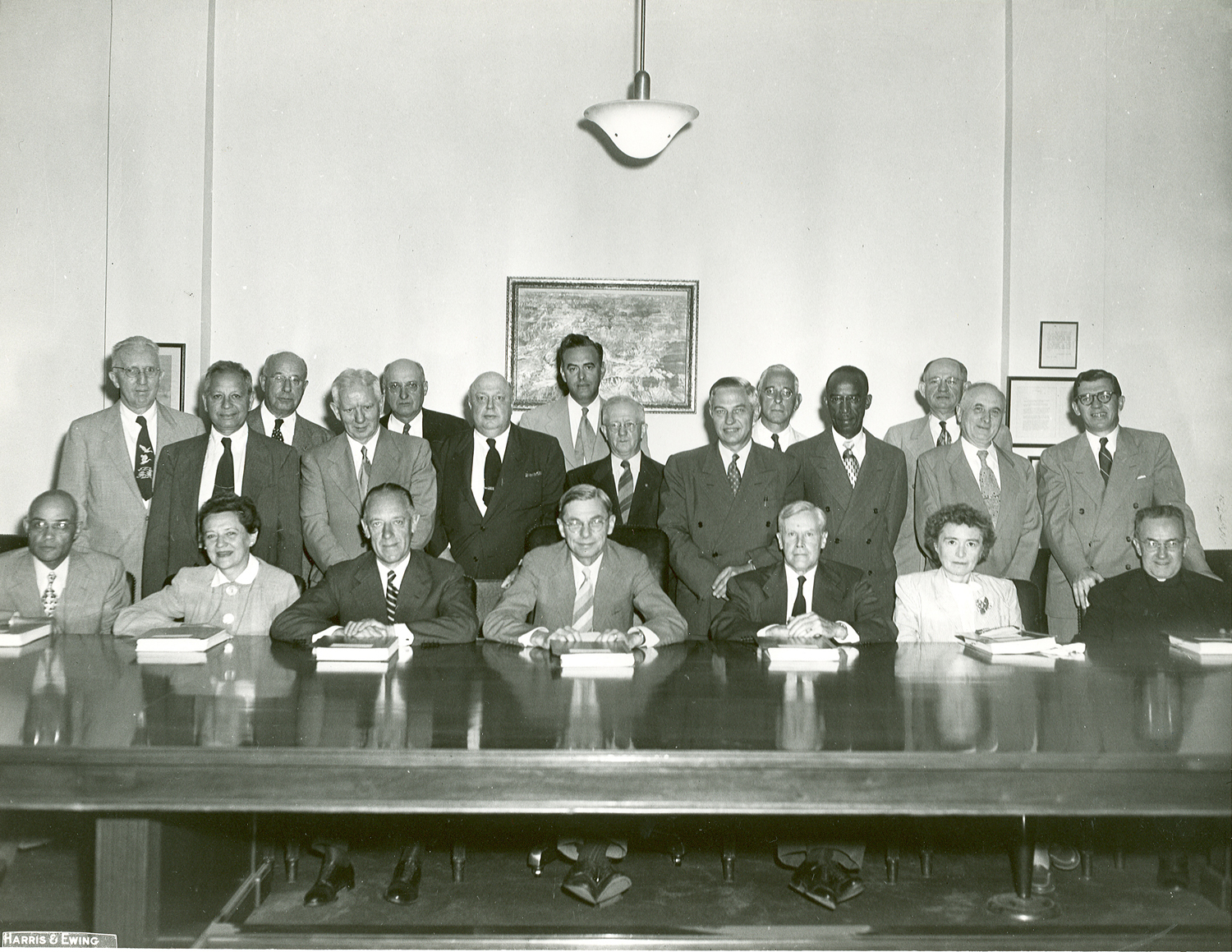
National Science Board Members in July 1951. Conant is front and center.

A sign of Conant's declining influence occurred in 1950, when he was passed over for the post of President of the National Academy of Sciences in favor of Detlev Bronk, the president of Johns Hopkins University, after a "revolt" by scientists unhappy with Conant. The GAC was enormously influential throughout the late 1940s, but the opposition of Oppenheimer and Conant to the development of the hydrogen bomb, only to be overridden by Truman in 1950, diminished its stature. It was reduced further when Oppenheimer and Conant were not reappointed when their terms expired in 1952, depriving the GAC of its two best-known members. Conant was appointed to the National Science Board, which administered the new National Science Foundation, and was elected its chairman, but this body had little financial or political clout. In April 1951, Truman appointed Conant to the Science Advisory Committee, but it would not develop into an influential body until the Eisenhower administration.

Conant's experience with the Manhattan Project convinced him that the public needed a better understanding of science, and he moved to expand the nascent history and philosophy of science program at Harvard. He took the lead personally by teaching a new undergraduate course, Natural Science 4, "On Understanding Science". His course notes became the basis for a book of the same name, published in 1948. In 1952, he began teaching another undergraduate course, Philosophy 150, "A Philosophy of Science". In his teachings and writing on the philosophy of science, he drew heavily on those of his Harvard colleague Willard Van Orman Quine. Conant contributed four chapters to the 1957 Harvard Case Histories in Experimental Science, including an account of the overthrow of the phlogiston theory. In 1951, he published Science and Common Sense, in which he attempted to explain the ways of scientists to laymen. Conant's ideas about scientific progress would come under attack by his own protégés, notably Thomas Kuhn in The Structure of Scientific Revolutions. Conant commented on Kuhn's manuscript in draft form.

=== Allied High Commissioner ===
In April 1951, Conant was approached by U.S. Secretary of State Dean Acheson about replacing John J. McCloy as United States High Commissioner for Germany, but he declined. However, after Dwight Eisenhower was elected president in 1952, Conant was again offered the job by the new Secretary of State, John Foster Dulles, and this time he accepted. At the Harvard Board of Overseers meeting on January 12, 1952, Conant announced that he would retire in September 1953 after twenty years at Harvard, having reached the pension age of sixty.

In Germany, there were major issues to be decided. Germany was still occupied by the Soviet Union, the United States, Great Britain and France. Dealing with the wartime allies was a major task for the high commissioner. West Germany, made up of the zones occupied by the three western powers, had been granted control of its own affairs, except for defense and foreign policy, in 1949. While most Germans wanted a neutral and reunited Germany, the Eisenhower administration sought to reduce its defense spending by rearming Germany and replacing American troops with Germans. Meanwhile, the House Un-American Activities Committee slammed Conant's staff as communist sympathizers and called for books by communist authors held in United States Information Agency (USIA) libraries in Germany to be burned.

The first crisis to occur on Conant's watch was the uprising of 1953 in East Germany. This brought the reunification issue to the fore. Konrad Adenauer's deft handling of the issue enabled him to handily win re-election as Chancellor of West Germany in September, but this also strengthened his hand in negotiations with Conant. Adenauer did not want his country to become a bargaining chip between the United States and the Soviet Union, nor did he want it to become a nuclear battlefield, a prospect raised by the arrival of American tactical nuclear weapons in 1953 as part of the Eisenhower administration's New Look policy. Conant lobbied for the European Defense Community, which would have established a pan-European military. This seemed to be the only way that German rearmament would be accepted, but opposition from France killed the plan. In what Conant considered a minor miracle, France's actions cleared the way for West Germany to become part of NATO with its own army.

At noon on May 6, 1955, Conant, along with the high commissioners from Britain and France, signed the documents ending Allied control of West Germany, admitting it to NATO, and allowing it to rearm. The office of the United States High Commissioner was abolished and Conant became instead the first United States Ambassador to West Germany. His role was now to encourage West Germany to build up its forces, while reassuring the Germans that doing so would not result in a United States withdrawal. Being fluent in German, Conant was able to give speeches to German audiences. He paid numerous visits to German educational and scientific organizations.

While high commissioner, Conant approved the release of many major and other German war criminals after serving only a fraction of their sentences, against protests from American political leaders and veterans' organizations (some of those sentenced had murdered American prisoners), accusing him of "moral amnesia". Such criticism continued when as ambassador he supported the West German government's leniency toward former Nazis.

=== Carnegie Corporation grant recipient and author ===
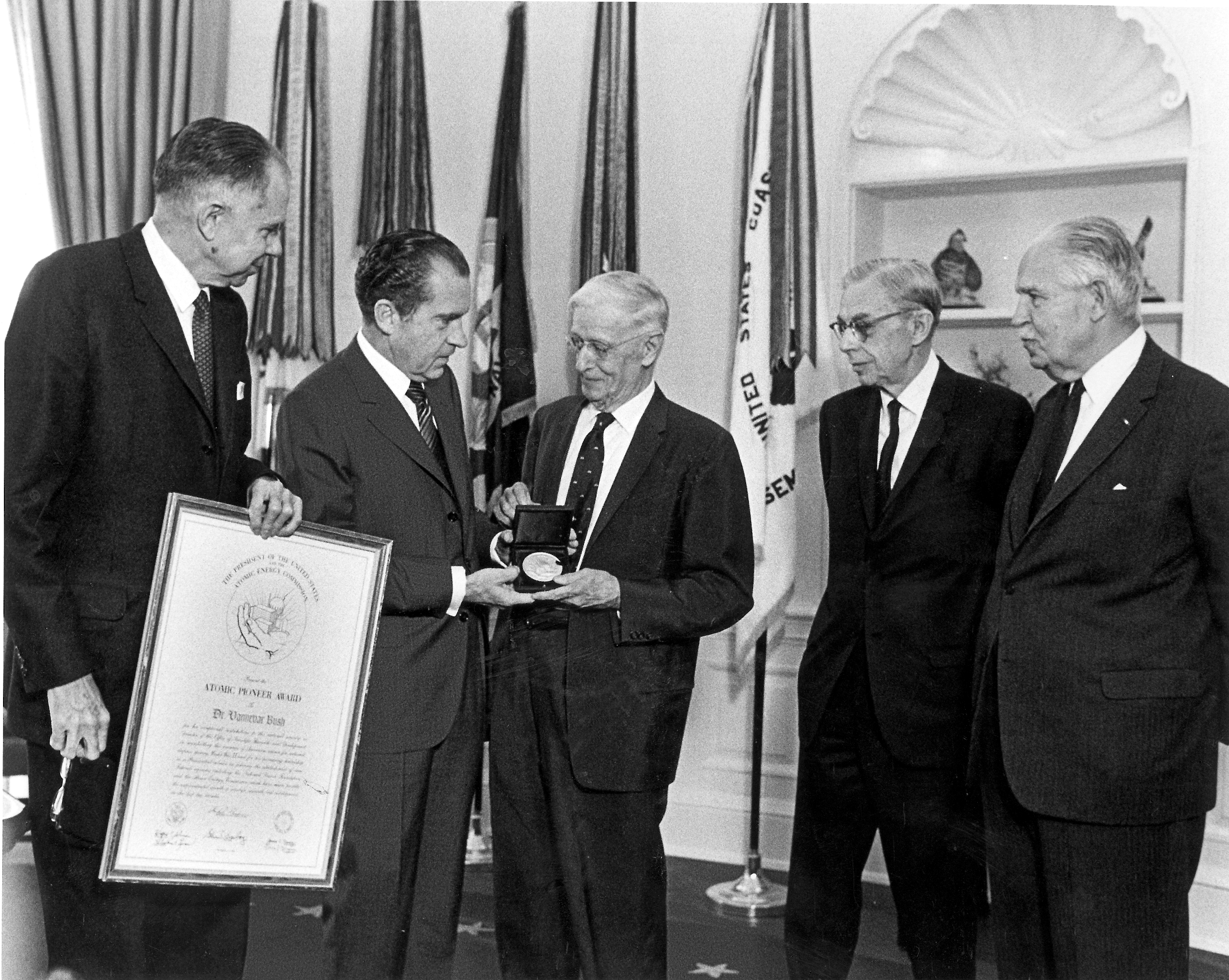
Glenn Seaborg, President Richard Nixon, presents the 1969 Atomic Pioneers Award to the three recipients, Vannevar Bush, Conant and Leslie Groves, on February 27, 1970.

Conant returned to the United States in February 1957, where he leased an apartment on the Upper East Side in New York City.

Between 1957 and 1965, the Carnegie Corporation of New York gave him over a million dollars to write studies of education. In 1959 he published The American High School Today, better known as the Conant Report. This became a best seller, resulting in Conant's appearance on the cover of Time magazine on September 14, 1959. In it, Conant called for a number of reforms, including the consolidation of high schools into larger bodies that could offer a broader range of curriculum choices. Although it was slammed by critics of the American system, who hoped for a system of education based on the European model, it did lead to a wave of reforms across the country.

His subsequent Slums and Suburbs in 1961 was far more controversial in its treatment of racial issues. Regarding busing as impractical, Conant urged Americans "to accept de facto segregated schools". This did not go over well with civil rights groups, and by 1964 Conant was forced to admit that he had been wrong. In The Education of American Teachers in 1963, Conant found much to criticize about the training of teachers. Most controversial was his defense of the arrangement by which teachers were certified by independent bodies rather than the teacher training colleges.

=== Presidential Medal of Freedom and other recognition ===
On December 6, 1963, President Lyndon Johnson presented Conant with the Presidential Medal of Freedom, with special distinction. He was selected for the award by President John F. Kennedy, but the ceremony was delayed prior to Kennedy's assassination.

In February 1970, President Richard Nixon presented Conant with the Atomic Pioneers Award from the Atomic Energy Commission. Other awards that Conant received during his long career included being made a Commander of Légion d'honneur by France in 1936 and an Honorary Commander of the Order of the British Empire by Britain in 1948, and he was awarded the Grand Cross of the Order of Merit of the Federal Republic of Germany in 1957. He was also awarded over 50 honorary degrees, and was posthumously inducted into the Alpha Chi Sigma Hall of Fame in 2000.

== Later years and death ==
Between 1965 and 1969, Conant, living with a heart condition, worked on his biography, My Several Lives. He became increasingly infirm, and had a series of strokes in 1977. He died in a nursing home in Hanover, New Hampshire, on February 11, 1978. His body was cremated and his ashes interred in the Thayer-Richards family plot at Mount Auburn Cemetery. He was survived by his wife and sons. His papers are in the Harvard University Archives. Among them was a sealed brown Manila envelope that Conant had given the archives in 1951, with instructions that it was to be opened by the president of Harvard in the 21st century. Opened by Harvard's 28th president, Drew Faust, in 2007, it contained a letter in which Conant expressed his hopes and fears for the future. "You will ... be in charge of a more prosperous and significant institution than the one over which I have the honor to preside", he wrote. "That [Harvard] will maintain the traditions of academic freedom, of tolerance for heresy, I feel sure."

== Legacy ==
Conant is the namesake of James B. Conant High School in Hoffman Estates, Illinois, and James B. Conant Elementary School in Bloomfield Hills, Michigan.

== Graduate students ==
Former graduate students of Conant include:

- Louis Fieser – organic chemist and professor emeritus at Harvard University renowned as the inventor of a militarily effective form of napalm. His award-winning research included work on blood-clotting agents including the first synthesis of vitamin K, synthesis and screening of quinones as antimalarial drugs, work with steroids leading to the synthesis of cortisone, and study of the nature of polycyclic aromatic hydrocarbons.
- Benjamin S. Garvey – noted chemist at BF Goodrich who worked on the development of synthetic rubber, contributed to understanding of vulcanization, and developed early techniques for small scale evaluation of rubbers.
- Frank Westheimer – was the Morris Loeb Professor of Chemistry Emeritus at Harvard University.

== Bibliography ==
- — with Black, N. H. (1920). Practical Chemistry: Fundamental Facts and Applications to Modern Life. New York: Macmillan. OCLC 3639905.
- — (1928). Organic Chemistry. New York: Macmillan.
- — (1932). Equilibria and Rates of Some Organic Reactions. New York: Columbia University Press.
- — (1933). The Chemistry of Organic Compounds. New York: Macmillan.
- — with Tishler, Max (1936). Organic Chemistry. New York: Macmillan.
- — with Black, N. H. (1937). New Practical Chemistry. New York: Macmillan.
- — with Tishler, Max (1939). The Chemistry of Organic Compounds. New York: Macmillan.
- — (1944). Our Fighting Faith. Cambridge: Harvard University Press.
- — with Blatt, A. H. (1947). The Chemistry of Organic Compounds. New York: Macmillan.
- — (1948). "On Understanding Science, An Historical Approach". American Scientist. 35 (1). New Haven: Yale University Press: 33–55. ISSN 0003-0996. PMID 20282982.
- — (1948). Education in a Divided World. Cambridge: Harvard University Press.
- — (1949). The Growth of Experimental Sciences: An Experiment in General Education. Cambridge: Harvard University Press.
- — with Blatt, A. H. (1949). Fundamentals of Organic Chemistry. New York: Macmillan.
- — (1951). Science and Common Sense. New Haven: Yale University Press.
- — (1953). Education and Liberty. Garden City, New York: Doubleday.
- — (1955). Gleichheit der Chancen: Erziehung und Gesellschaftsordnung in den Vereinigten Staaten. Bad Manheim: Christian Verlag.
- — (1956). The Citadel of Learning. New Haven: Yale University Press.
- — (1957). Harvard Case Histories in Experimental Science. Cambridge: Harvard University Press.
- — (1958). Deutschland und die Freiheit. Frankfurt: Ullstein.
- — (1959). The American High School Today. New York: McGraw-Hill.
- — (1959). The Child, the Parent, and the State. Cambridge: Harvard University Press.
- — (1960). Education in the Junior High School Years. New York: McGraw-Hill.
- — (1961). Slums and Suburbs, A Commentary on Schools in Metropolitan Areas. New York: McGraw-Hill.
- — (1962). Thomas Jefferson and the Development of American Public Education. Berkeley: University of California Press.
- — (1962). Germany and Freedom, A Personal Appraisal. New York: Capricorn Books.
- — (1963). The Education of American Teachers. New York: McGraw-Hill.
- — (1964). Shaping Educational Policy. New York: McGraw-Hill.
- — (1964). Two Modes of Thought. New York: Trident Press.
- — (1967). The Comprehensive High School, A Second Report to Interested Citizens. New York: McGraw-Hill.
- — (1967). "Scientific Principles and Moral Conduct". American Scientist. 55 (3). Cambridge: Cambridge University Press: 311–28. ISSN 0003-0996. PMID 6050417.
- — (1970). My Several Lives, Memoirs of a Social Inventor. New York: Harper & Row. OCLC 58674.
  For a complete list of his published scientific papers, see Bartlett 1983, pp. 113–121.

== Notes ==
Academic offices
Preceded by Abbott Lawrence Lowell	23rd President of Harvard University; 1933–1953	Succeeded by Nathan Marsh Pusey
Preceded by Anton J. Carlson	President of the American Association for the Advancement of Science; 1945	Succeeded by C. F. Kettering
Government offices
Preceded by Vannevar Bush	Chairman, National Defense Research Committee; 1941–1947	Extinct
Diplomatic posts
Preceded by John J. McCloy	American High Commissioner for Occupied Germany; 1953–1955	Extinct
Preceded by Leland B. Morris (as chargé d'affaires in 1941)	United States Ambassador to Germany; 1955–1957	Succeeded by David K. E. Bruce
Awards
Preceded by Robert A. Lovett	Sylvanus Thayer Award recipient 1965	Succeeded by Carl Vinson
