= Elmer Peter Kohler =

American organic chemist

- Born: November 6, 1865; Egypt, Pennsylvania, U.S.
- Died: May 24, 1938 (aged 72)
- Education: Muhlenberg College; Johns Hopkins University
- Scientific career
- Fields: Organic chemistry, synthetic chemistry
- Workplaces: Bryn Mawr College; Harvard University
- Doctoral advisor: Ira Remsen
- Doctoral students: James B. Conant; Lee Irvin Smith; Robert Percy Barnes

Elmer Peter Kohler (November 6, 1865 - May 24, 1938) was an American organic chemist who spent his career on the faculty at Bryn Mawr College and later at Harvard University. At both institutions, he was notable for his effectiveness in teaching.

== Early life and education ==
Kohler was born in Egypt, Pennsylvania to a family of Pennsylvania Dutch heritage. He attended Muhlenberg College in Allentown, Pennsylvania, where he graduated in 1868. But he was not yet fully focused on chemistry, and took only one chemistry course there. After graduating, he took a job as a passenger agent with the Santa Fe Railroad. He returned to education and received a master's degree from Muhlenberg College in 1889. He then attended Johns Hopkins University in Baltimore, where he received his Ph.D. in 1892.

== Career ==
After completing his Ph.D., Kohler was appointed as an instructor at Bryn Mawr College. He became a professor there in 1900 and later became head of the chemistry department. In 1912, he moved to Harvard University, becoming the Abbott and James Lawrence Professor two years later and the Sheldon Emery Professor in 1934. At both institutions, he was recognized as an excellent teacher and lecturer. However, he avoided other public speaking events, such as scientific meetings and talks, which those who knew him attributed to shyness.

Throughout his career, Kohler was noted as a skilled experimentalist, continuing to work in the laboratory himself till very shortly before his death. He was particularly noted for skill in fractional crystallization and for investigations of the synthesis and properties of various unsaturated compounds of interest. Among his earliest graduate students at Harvard was James B. Conant, who later became president of the university.

In 1920, Kohler was elected to the National Academy of Sciences. In 1926, he was elected to the German National Academy of Sciences Leopoldina.
