= DuPont Central Research =

Research organization of DuPont

Central Research Department was the principal basic research organization of DuPont from 1957 until its major downsizing in 2016. Based primarily at the DuPont Experimental Station and Chestnut Run in Wilmington, Delaware, it was one of the company's main centers for long-term scientific research and industrial innovation.

The department was created in 1957, when the research organization of DuPont's Chemicals Department was renamed Central Research Department. It later operated under related names, including Central Research and Development Department and Central Research and Development. Its work included polymer science, organofluorine chemistry, organometallic chemistry, catalysis, materials science, photochemistry, and biological research, and contributed to DuPont businesses in areas such as agricultural chemicals, fluorochemicals, polymers, electronic materials, and biotechnology. It was eventually expanded to include laboratories in Geneva, Switzerland, Seoul, South Korea, Shanghai, China, and India (Hyderabad).

== History ==
CRD Research Directors and Vice Presidents
| Name | Years |
|---|---|
| Paul L.Salzberg | 1957–1967 |
| David M. McQueen | 1968–1971 |
| Theodore L. Cairns | 1972–1975 |
| Howard Ensign Simmons, Jr. | 1975–1979 |
| C. Edward Lorenz | 1980 |
| Robert Naylor | 1981 |
| Charles Bottomley | 1982–1983 |
| Richard Quisenberry | 1984–1992 |
| Joseph Miller | 1993–1995 |
| James M. Meyer | 1997–2000 |
| Thomas M. Connelly | 2001–2005 |
| Uma Chowdhry | 2006–2010 |
| Douglas W. Muzyka | 2010–2016 |

The company established a tradition of basic scientific research starting with hiring of Wallace Carothers in 1928 and his systemization of polymer science that led to the development of polyamides such as nylon-6,6 and polychloroprene (neoprene) in the early 1930s. This tradition waned during World War II then underwent a renaissance in the 1950s. The establishment of Central Research in 1957 formalized a corporate commitment to basic research. The execution and publication of high quality research assisted recruiting and promoted the image of DuPont while raising morale among the CRD staff. The purpose of the research was to discover "the next nylon", because Carothers' success and the resulting commercialization of nylon had driven the Company's profits through the 1950s. (This research objective was never met.) Nonetheless, another important stated goal for CRD was “diversification through research,” and CRD produced a stream of scientific innovations that contributed to many different businesses throughout the corporation.

CRD combined industrial and fundamental research, and the mix of the two features was often determined by the head of CR&D. The title expanded from Director of Research to Vice President of Technology to Chief Technology Officer with varying degrees of impact on research throughout the corporation as well as in CRD. The name of CRD also changed to reflect the times, starting with Chemicals Department and moving through Central Research Department (CRD), Central Research and Development Department (CR&DD), to the present Central Research and Development (CR&D).

CRD conducted research in a number of topical areas, often requiring an interdisciplinary approach. DuPont's explored chemical reactions in supercritical water in the 1950s to support its production of CrO_{2} for magnetic recording tapes. Hyperbaric recrystallization of ultra-high molecular weight polyethylene led to DuPont's business in Hylamer polyethylene for bearing surfaces in hip and knee replacement arthroplasty. Urea and uracil compounds discovered in CRD were potent and selective herbicides, propelling DuPont into the agricultural chemicals business and culminating in sulfonylurea herbicides. Potassium titanyl phosphate or KTP is a versatile nonlinear optical material, originally designed to frequency doubling red lasers to green for bloodless laser eye surgery; it now find additional application in urological surgery and hand-held green laser pointers.

In the 1950s, the CRD housed a broad-based research program aimed largely at the synthesis and study of new classes of compounds. Synthesis of new organic and inorganic compounds accounted for about half of the total research. When the National Institute of Health invited DuPont to submit compounds to its screening efforts, they rated DuPont as submitting by far the most diverse range of compounds – pharmaceutical companies were submitting things that looked like pharmaceuticals, but DuPont submitted compounds that would be classed internally as catalysts, optical materials, monomers, oligomers, ligands, inorganics, and other unusual materials.

In addition to chemical synthesis, CRD maintained efforts centered on new physical and analytical techniques, chemical structure and reaction mechanism, and solid-state physics. DuPont continued in polymer research. Biological research has increased significantly.

Until recent years, a substantial portion of research was of an academic nature. This academic research was reflected in the general atmosphere of the organization. In the late 1960s, CRD established a program for recruiting postdoctoral fellows. These fellowships were generally for two years and had the expectation that the fellow would leave to an academic institution. Every year one or two DuPont scientists would take one year leaves of absence for university study and teaching. It was also accepted that every year a number of scientists would leave DuPont for academic positions and that several professors would join the staff permanently. A notable example was Richard Schrock, who left CRD for MIT and won the Nobel Prize for Chemistry. CRD was supported by numerous high-profile consultants who have made significant contributions to DuPont. Jack Roberts of Caltech and Speed Marvel each consulted for well over 50 years and provided a steady supply of well-trained chemists. Robert Grubbs, who shared the Nobel Prize with Schrock, consulted for many years. These academic connections were sources of new generations of CRD researchers.

The scientific accomplishments of Theodore L. Cairns, William D. Phillips, Earl Muetterties, Howard E. Simmons, Jr., and George Parshall were recognized by their election to the National Academy of Sciences.

CRD management fostered an open and collaborative style. At its founding, the division of labor in CRD was “management,” “bench chemists,” and “technicians,” with the management and bench chemists having separate but overlapped promotional tracks. Under the Hay Grade system of pay levels that was employed then and now, there were eight professional or promotional levels for the “bench chemists,” yet there was a single undistinguished title. This approach promoted interaction.

The Hay Grades for those in management started higher and ended considerably higher, but there was significant overlap with the bench chemist levels. Thus it was not unusual for a supervisor or manager to have one or more scientists reporting to him (there were no women in management at this time) who were at higher pay levels than he was. There was one reported instance where the supervisor never got to pass pay raises to the “bench chemist” because management didn't want to make him feel bad; the next level Manager who did pass on the pay notification said, “They didn’t care how I felt.” Titles explicitly tied to salary level were instituted in May, 1993, but the openness remains today as does the situation of Managers managing higher level scientists.

At the beginning of CRD, “technicians” in CRD were usually high-school educated and often had military service. They were clearly just extra hands for the bench chemists who were all PhDs and the bench chemists were expected to spend most of their time at the bench. It was virtually impossible for a technician to progress in CRD, but they could at plant sites and would sometimes move for the opportunity. Starting in the early 1990s, mostly as a result of the growth of the pharmaceutical and life science efforts, technicians with bachelor's degrees and later, master's degrees became the norm. There are even some technicians holding PhDs from foreign universities. Nonetheless, it remains difficult for a technician to break into the bench chemist ranks and they usually transfer to business units in search of more opportunity.

Many of the PhDs who came to CRD transferred to business units. From the 1980s to early 90s, management tried to move all PhDs to a business unit within their first five years. The PhDs had spent their entire lives in an academic environment, so they knew nothing else, but it was realized that at some point they would grow up and realize that working at the bench was not what some of them would want to do their entire career. The issue was that they were too senior and naive to move into entry-level positions in businesses and their competition were similarly aged BS engineers who would have had about five years of experience keeping a plant running. Of those who took the opportunity, about half returned to CR&D. Of those who returned, about half left again. The relatively high turnover provided more opportunity for CRD to hire outstanding new PhDs. Transfers to business units became less common in the 1990s and the average age of CRD personnel rose considerably as a result. With baby-boomers starting to retire, there is more recruiting and there is a noticeable rejuvenation of the staff.

Responsibility for the technical direction of research has shifted to the chemist as they carry out short-term projects in support of the business units. PhDs who get MBAs are now more common. Unlike the early years, all management has had business unit experience and many were hired into business units, coming into CRD later in their careers. These managers are often far more administrative in their approach, not having the strong technical backgrounds required to keep up with their technical employees. Some managers have come to rely upon their senior technical staff, but there is no clear guideline on the role that these senior scientists can or should play in managing the programs and careers of the younger scientists.

In late 2015, the name of the organization was changed to DuPont Science and Innovation portending the major layoff on January 4, 2016, which marked the end of the organization as a major force in research. Combined, the Molecular Sciences and Engineering and Materials Science and Engineering portions of CR&D went from 330 employees to 34 in the new Science and Innovation organization.

== Organofluorine chemistry ==
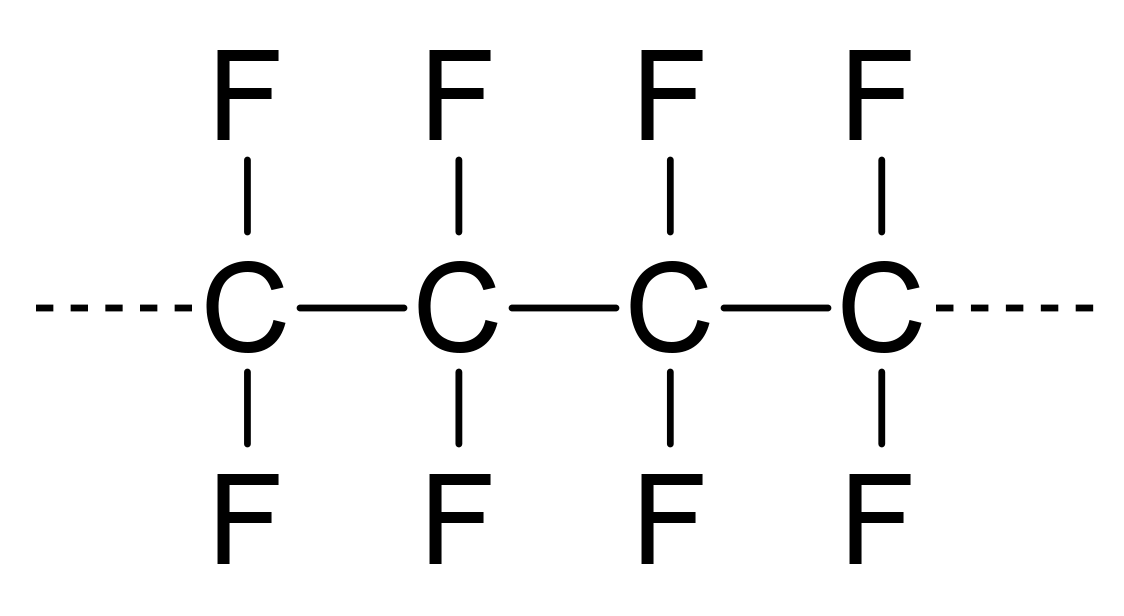
A fluorocarbon chain is the backbone of Teflon and related chemicals

On April 6, 1938, Roy Plunkett at DuPont's Jackson Laboratory in New Jersey was working with gases related to DuPont's Freon refrigerants when he and his associates discovered that a sample of gaseous tetrafluoroethylene had polymerized spontaneously into a white, waxy solid. The polymer was polytetrafluoroethylene (PTFE) commercialized by DuPont as Teflon in 1945. Because DuPont was basic in a variety of fluorinated materials, it was logical that organofluorine chemistry became important to DuPont. The discovery that tetrafluoroethylene would cyclize with a wide variety of compounds to give fluorinated compounds opened up routes to a range of organofluorine compounds.

The hazards and difficulties of handling highly reactive and corrosive fluorinating reagents could be accommodated by DuPont's emphasis on safety and DuPont's association with the Manhattan Project provided many chemists and engineers with the background necessary to carry out the work. Availability of the Pressure Research Lab on the Experimental Station provided the necessary protection for most but not all of those reactions that went awry. Notable scientists included William Middleton, David England, Carl Krespan, William Sheppard, Owen Webster, Bruce Smart, Malli Rao, Robert Wheland, and Andrew Feiring, all of whom filed many patents for DuPont. Sheppard wrote one of the important early books on the subject. Smart's book followed. Smart's comments in Chemical Reviews in 1996, “Scientific and commercial interests in fluorine chemistry burgeoned after 1980, largely fueled by the need to replace industrial chlorofluorocarbons and the rapidly growing practical opportunities for organofluorine compounds in crop protection, medicine and diverse materials applications. Although fluorine is much less abstruse now than when I entered the field a generation ago, it remains a specialized topic and most chemists are unfamiliar, or at least uncomfortable, with the synthesis and behavior of organofluorine compounds,” remain true today.

CRD undertook a program on alternatives for chlorofluorocarbons in refrigerants in the late 1970s after the first warnings of damage to stratospheric ozone were published. The Catalysis Center of CRD, under the leadership of Leo Manzer, was quick to respond with new technology to produce alternative hydrochlorofluorocarbons (HCFCs) that were commercialized as DuPont's Suva refrigerants.

== Cyanocarbon chemistry ==
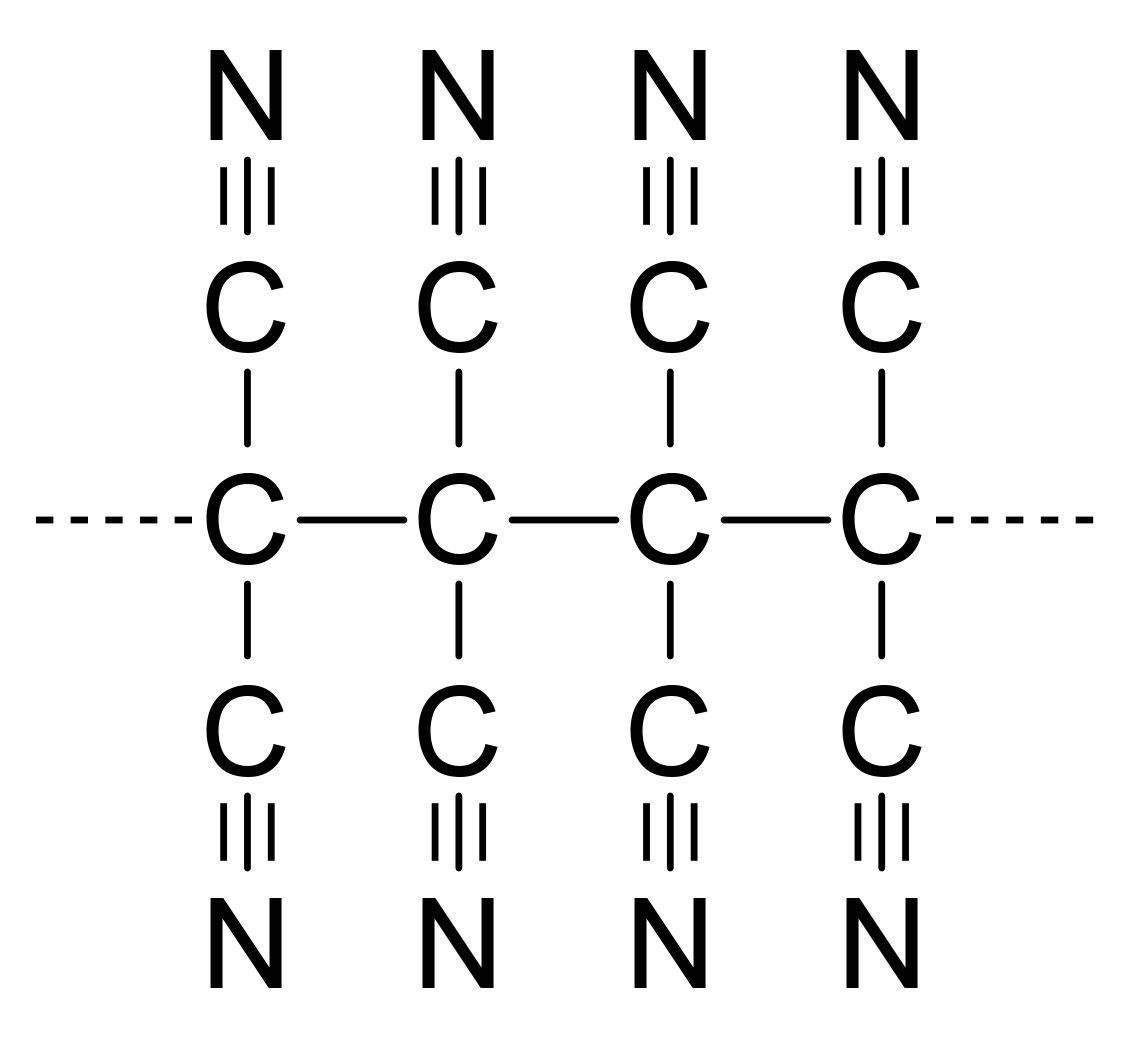
A cyanocarbon polymer

During the 1960s and 1970s, CRD developed a program under the direction of Theodore Cairns to synthesize long-chain cyanocarbons analogous to long-chain fluorocarbons like Teflon. The work culminated in a series of twelve papers in the Journal of the American Chemical Society in 1958. Several authors of those papers grew to prominent positions at DuPont including Richard E. Benson (Associate Director, CRD), Theodore L. Cairns (Research Director, CRD), Richard E. Heckert (CEO of DuPont), William D. Phillips (Associate Director, CRD), Howard E. Simmons (Research Director and VP, CRD), and Susan A. Vladuchick (Plant Manager). This trend indicates the importance of technical qualification for promotion in the company at that time. The publication stimulated other researchers to investigate these compounds.

Diiminosuccinonitrile (DISN)

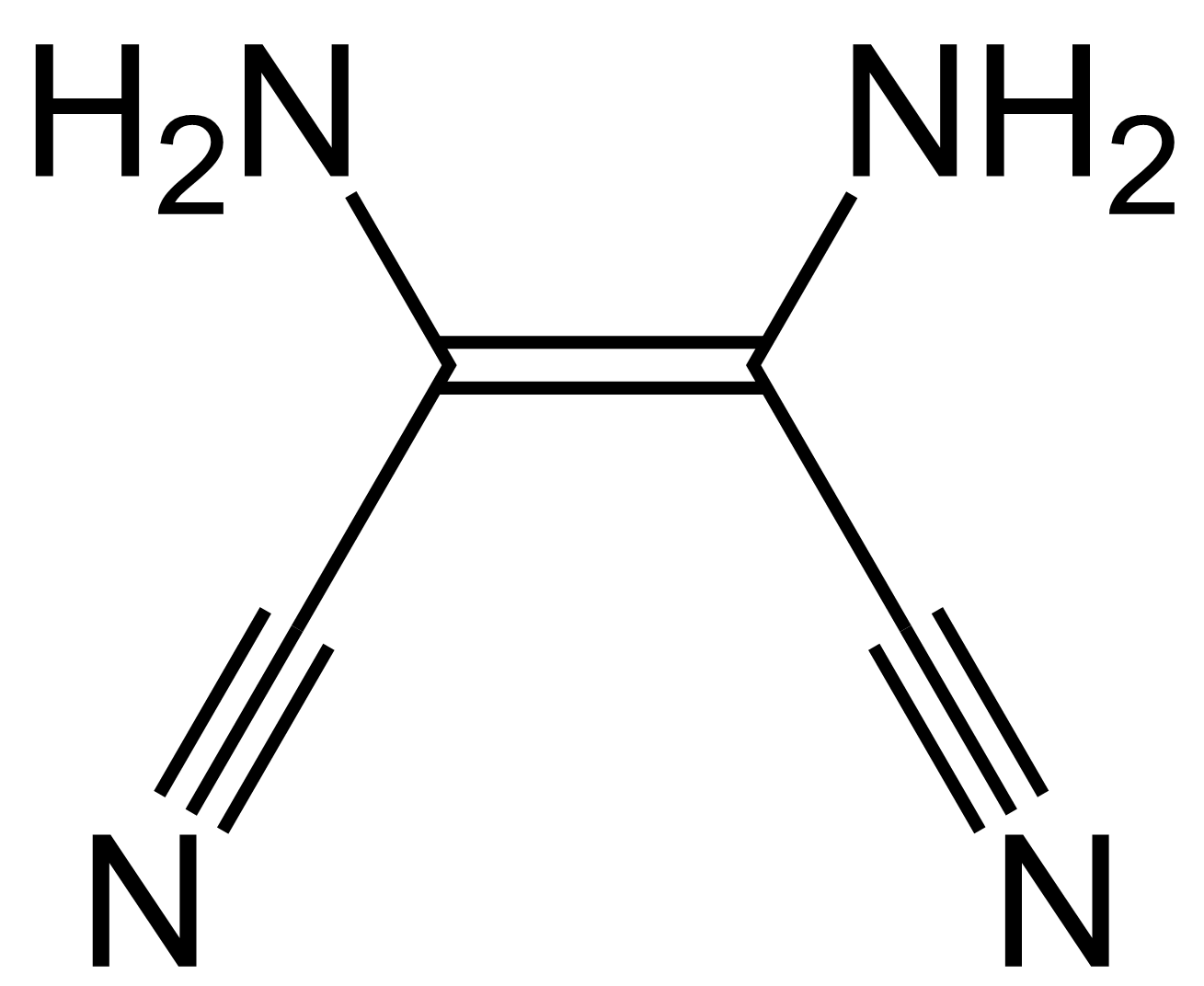
Diaminomaleonitrile (DAMN)

Prospective applications included dyes, pharmaceuticals, pesticides, organic magnets, and incorporation in new types of polymers. No commercial applications resulted from this extensive research effort. Partly for this work, Cairns was awarded medals for Creative Work in Synthetic Organic Chemistry by the American Chemical Society and the Synthetic Organic Award of the Chemical Manufacturers Association. Another line of chemistry developed around Owen Webster's synthesis of diiminosuccinonitrile (DISN), which could be converted to diaminomaleonitrile (DAMN), leading to another series of patent and papers. Simmons used sodium maleonitriledithiolate for the preparation many novel substances of including tetracyanothiophene, tetracyanopyrrole, and pentacyanocyclopentadiene.

== Metal oxides ==
Arthur Sleight led a team focused on perovskites, such as the K-Bi-Pb-O system, that laid the groundwork for subsequent breakthroughs in high-temperature superconductors. In solution phase chemistry of oxides, the work of Walter Knoth on organic soluble polyoxoanions led to the development of the now large area with numerous applications in oxidation catalysis.

== Dynamic NMR spectroscopy ==
Indicative of interplay between applications and fundamental science were many studies on stereodynamics conducted at CRD by Jesson, Meakin, and Muetterties. One of the early studies focused on the non-rigidity of SF_{4}, a reagent relevant to the preparation of fluorocarbons. Subsequent studies led to the discovery of the first stereochemically non-rigid octahedral complexes of the type FeH_{2}(PR_{3})_{4}.

== Polymer science ==
Owen Webster discovered group-transfer polymerization (GTP), the first new polymerization process developed since living anionic polymerization. The major aspects of the mechanism of the reaction were determined and the process was quickly converted to commercial application for automotive finishes and ink jet inks. The basic process of group transfer also has application to general organic synthesis, including natural products.

At about the same time, Andrew Janowicz developed a useful version of cobalt catalyzed chain transfer for controlling the molecular weight of free radicalpolymerizations. The technology has been further developed by Alexei Gridnev and Steven Ittel. It, too, was quickly commercialized and a fundamental understanding of the process developed over a longer period of time.

Rudolph Pariser was the director of the Advanced Materials Science and Engineering at the time of these advances.

In 1995, Maurice Brookhart, professor at the University of North Carolina and a DuPont CRD consultant, invented a new generation of post-metallocene catalysts for olefin coordination polymerization based upon late transition metals with his postdoctoral student, Lynda Johnson who later joined CRD. The technology, DuPont's Versipol olefin polymerization technology, was developed by a substantial team of CRD scientists over the next ten years.

== Organometallic chemistry ==
Cramer's Dimer

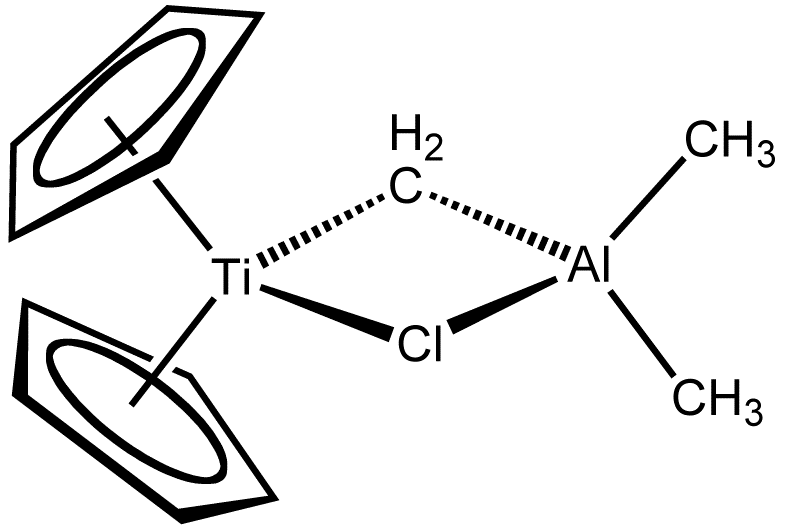
Tebbe Reagent

CRD developed a major interest in inorganic and organometallic chemistry. Earl Muetterties established a program aimed at fundamental borane chemistry. Walter Knoth discovered the first polyhedral borane anion, B_{10}H_{10}^{=}, and also discovered that the borane anions displayed a substitution chemistry similar to that of aromatic hydrocarbons. Norman Miller discovered the B_{12}H_{12}^{=} anion in an effort to find a new route to B_{10}H_{10}^{=}. George Parshall joined CRD in 1954. His industrial sabbatical at Imperial College London with Geoffrey Wilkinson in 1960-61 introduced him to organometallic chemistry. Muetterties left DuPont to join the faculty of Cornell in 1973. After Muetterties and Parshall, the organometallic chemistry group was led by Steven Ittel and then Henry Bryndza before it was dispersed throughout a number of groups in CRD. Parshall and Ittel coauthored a book on “Homogeneous Catalysis” that has become the standard reference on the subject.

The seminal contributions of Richard Cramer and Fred Tebbe are acknowledged by their named compounds, “Cramer’s dimer,” Rh_{2}Cl_{2}(C_{2}H_{4})_{4}, and the “Tebbe reagent.” Tebbe had an influence on his lab partner, Richard Schrock who initiated a program on M=C chemistry at DuPont and continued it when he moved to MIT. The chemistry forms the basis for olefin metathesis, and Schrock ultimately shared the Nobel Prize with Robert Grubbs, a CRD consultant, for the metathesis work. Anthony Arduengo’s persistent carbenes opened up a new area of chemistry and they have proven to be important ligands in the metathesis process.

There was a vigorous effort on the activation of C-H bonds with contributions by Parshall, Thomas Herskovitz, Ittel, and David Thorn. Chad Tolman developed his “ligand cone angle” theory that developed into the widely accepted electronic and steric effects of ligands on inorganic and organometallic complexes.

Organometallic chemistry in CRD has further included R. Thomas Baker's heterobinuclear complexes, Patricia L. Watson's organolanthanides, William A. Nugent's metal-ligand multiple bonds, Jeffery Thompson's and Mani Subramanyam's development of technetium complexes for radiopharmaceuticals, and Bob Burch's and Karin Karel's fluoro-organometallic chemistry. The major outlet for organometallic chemistry is homogeneous catalysis. DuPont developed a major technology based upon the nickel catalyzed addition of two molecules of hydrogen cyanide to butadiene, giving adiponitrile, a nylon intermediate, initially through the work of William C. Drinkard. The mechanistic work to provide an understanding of the technology was done in CRD and led to a large program on next-generation technology before the business was sold to Koch Industries. Other applications of homogeneous catalysis studied in CRD include ethylene polymerization, cyclohexane oxidation to adipic acid, and butadiene carbonylation to nylon intermediates. Approaches to catalyst systems have included homogeneous organometallic catalysts, heterobinuclear catalysts, polyoxometalates, enzymes, catalytic membrane reactors and supported organometallics.

== Photochemistry and physics ==
David M. McQueen, one of the early Directors of CRD was a physical chemist from the University of Wisconsin–Madison. His research on photochemistry and photography resulted in thirty-five patents. It was his background that got CRD started in photochemistry and photophysics. David Eaton later headed a strong team involved in photopolymerization color proofing for the printing industry.

There was a strong program in inorganic non-linear optical materials that resulted in optical frequency doubling for the “green lasers” mentioned above. This program was extended into organic materials with NLO properties.

There was also a strong effort on materials for the display industry and methods for preparing devices for displays. These included printable electronics, thermal transfer methods for color filters, carbon nanotubes for field emission displays, and OLED materials and devices. A substantial effort was made on next generation photoresists for the semiconductor industry containing hydrocarbon and fluorocarbon monomers to replace wavelengths of 193 nm with 157 nm wavelengths for better resolution. Though most of the requirements were achieved, the need for that shorter wavelength node was eliminated by the introduction of immersion lithography and new fluids for immersion lithography continue to be of substantial interest. Development of phase-shift masks was commercialized.

== Biological sciences ==
One area always deemed important for diversification of CRD's programs was related to the biological sciences. Charles Stine had promoted biochemistry as a field of research for Du Pont and Stine Laboratories are named in his honor as a result. In the early 1950s, CRD began a program to investigate chemicals for biological applications. Charles Todd prepared substituted ureas as potential antibacterial agents, which when screened, proved to be effective herbicides. These led to DuPont's very successful and very selective sulfonylurea herbicides. CRD's program included agricultural and veterinary chemicals and bacteriological and microbiological studies. The culmination of this work was DuPont's purchase of Pioneer Hi-Bred Seeds and its integration into DuPont's agrichemical enterprise.

In the mid- 1950s, CRD began work on the chemistry of nitrogen fixation in plants, a study that would develop into a major effort over the next decade. In 1963, Ralph Hardy joined the CRD and brought Du Pont's nitrogen fixation research to international prominence with more than a hundred papers on the subject. Chemical Week called him, "one of the nation's top achievers in the dual role of scientist and scientific manager," though such managers remained common in CRD through the 1960s and 1970s.

Fermentation microbiology and selective genetic modification became important to the CRD development of a biological route to 1,3-propylene glycol a new monomer for making polyester. The availability of this new monomer led to the development and commercialization of Sorona, a premium polyester. Substantial success was also achieved in the synthesis of unnatural peptides and proteins to accomplish specific functions and prediction of their tertiary structures.

Advances in DNA sequencing technology based on synthesis of novel fluorescent labels led to Qualicon, a DuPont venture that identifies bacteria by examination of their DNA using PCR. This technology has led to significant improvements in the safety of the food supply chain in the United States and around the world.

== General references ==
- David A. Hounshell and John Kenley Smith. Science and Corporate Strategy. DuPont R&D, 1902–1980. New York: Cambridge University Press, 1988.
- J. J. Bohning. Howard E. Simmons, Jr., Oral History. Philadelphia: Chemical Heritage Foundation, 1993.
- R. C. Ferguson. William D. Phillips and nuclear magnetic resonance at DuPont. In Encyclopedia of Nuclear Magnetic Resonance, Vol. 1, Eds. D. M. Grant and R. K. Harris, pp. 309–13, John Wiley & Sons, 1996.
- R. G. Bergman, G. W. Parshall, and K. N. Raymond. Earl L. Muetterties, 1927–1984. In Biographical Memoirs, vol. 63, pp. 383–93. Washington, D.C.: National Academy Press, 1994.
- B. C. McKusick and Theodore L. Cairns, Cyanocarbons in Kirk-Othmer Encyclopedia of Chemical Technology, 2nd Edition, 6, 625-33 (1965)
