= Shuttle catalysis =

Shuttle catalysis is used to describe catalytic reactions where a chemical entity of a donor molecule is transferred to an acceptor molecule. In these reactions, while the number of chemical bonds of each reactant changes, the types and total number of chemical bonds remain constant over the course of the reaction. In contrast to many organic reactions which exothermicity practically renders them irreversible, reactions operated under shuttle catalysis are often reversible. However, the position of the equilibrium can be driven to the product side through Le Chatelier’s principle. The driving forces for this equilibrium shift are typically the formation of a gas/precipitation, the use of high ground-state energy reactants or the formation of stabilized products or the excess equivalents of a reactant.

Image on center

The relocation of shuttled entities is often mediated by a transition metal catalyst, which serves to functionalize or defunctionalize a compound of interest. An advantage to this process is that it excludes the process of handling toxic or reactive raw chemical entities. However, these reactions require the development of catalytic systems that can efficiently deliver the shuttled entities between the reactants under mild conditions through a sequence of elementary steps.

== Applications ==
=== Transfer hydrogenation ===
Transfer hydrogenation has been extensively studied to reduce various functional groups without requiring hazardous pressurized H_{2}.

=== Transfer hydroacylation ===
In 1999, Chul-Ho Jun and Hyuk Lee reported the first example of hydroacylation through shuttle catalysis. In this example, 3-methyl-2-aminopyridine was used to activate the acyl group as well as coordinate to the rhodium catalyst, promoting C–C bond cleavage to eventually enable aldehyde transfer from a ketone to an alkene. The driving force of this reaction is the excess presence of alkenes and the formation of stable styrenes/extrusion of volatile ethylene. This method doesn’t require the use of toxic and self-reacting aldehydes such as acetaldehyde in the traditional hydroacylation procedures.

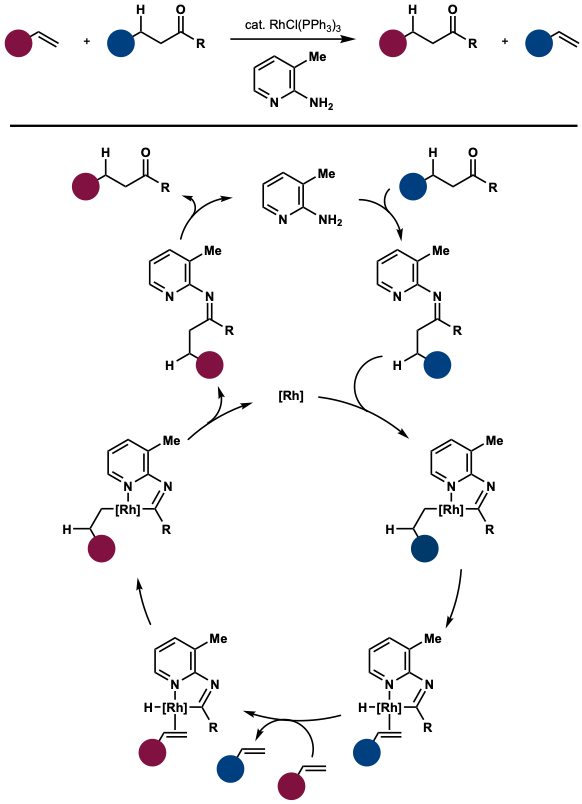
Image on center

=== Transfer hydroformylation ===
Hydroformylation is a classical transition-metal catalyzed reaction, and it has been widely employed in industrial settings. However, a drawback of this reaction is the requirement of the hazardous mixture of H_{2}/CO. For that reason, a process to replace H_{2}/CO gas with a non-hazardous aldehyde is sought after.

In 1999, Christian P. Lenges and Maurice Brookhart reported isovaleraldehyde as a suitable surrogate for H_{2}/CO transfer to 3,3-dimethyl-1-butene by using a rhodium(I) catalyst.

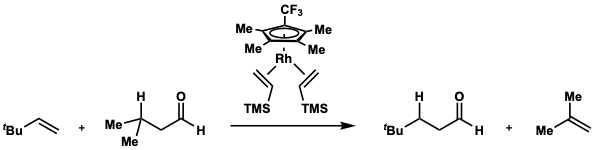
Image on center

The reverse of this process was rendered catalytic by Vy M. Dong and co-workers in 2015. They performed dehydroformylation on aldehydes to achieve the corresponding alkenes. For this transformation, they used either norbornene or norbornadiene as a H_{2}/CO acceptor, promoting reactivity through strain-release.

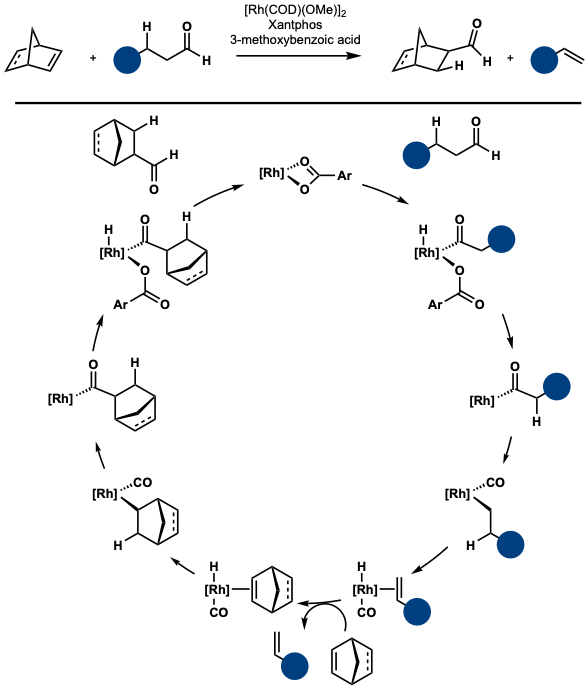
Image on center

=== Transfer hydrocyanation ===
To replace the use of toxic hydrocyanide (HCN) gas or surrogates such as acetone cyanohydrin, Bill Morandi and co-workers developed a hydrocyanation strategy using shuttle catalysis. In this example, they use isovaleronitrile as a HCN surrogate under nickel/aluminum co-catalyzed conditions to afford hydrocyanation reactions of various alkenes. The use of isovaleronitrile allows careful control of HCN concentration, and the formation of volatile isobutylene is the driving force for the reaction.

Image on center

=== Others ===
Other chemical entities including arenes, CO/HCl, HMgBr, H_{2}Zn, H_{2}O, carbene, silylene, sulfenium have also been shuttled under this catalysis platform.
