= Frederick N. Tebbe =

American chemist (1935–1995)

Frederick Nye Tebbe
- Born: March 20, 1935; Oakland, California
- Died: September 28, 1995 (aged 60); Hockessin, Delaware
- Education: Pennsylvania State University, University of Indiana
- Known for: Tebbe's reagent, borane chemistry
- Spouse: Margaret Manzer
- Scientific career
- Fields: Organometallic Chemistry
- Workplaces: DuPont Central Research
- Thesis: Studies of Interconversions of Boron Hydrides (1963)
- Doctoral advisor: Riley Schaeffer

Frederick Nye Tebbe was an American chemist known for his work on organometallic chemistry. Tebbe was born in Oakland, California on March 20, 1935. His father, Charles L. Tebbe, worked for the United States Forest Service so Fred’s early education took place in Montana, Oregon, Maryland and Pennsylvania. He married Margaret Manzer in 1960, and they had a son (Andy, born in 1966) and a daughter (Sarah, born in 1971). He died of pancreatic cancer at his home in Delaware on September 28, 1995.

== Education ==
Tebbe received a bachelor's degree in chemistry from Pennsylvania State University. His senior research focused on the synthesis of diboron tetrachloride from BCl3 and Hg discharge cells under the direction of Professor Thomas Wartik. Wartik encouraged Tebbe to join the group of Professor Riley Schaeffer at Indiana University. Instead, Tebbe spent a year at Montana State University studying psychology and philosophy: After this interlude and thoughts of going into Forestry, he finally decided to join Schaeffer at Indiana.

The area of borane chemistry was growing rapidly, in part due to the Cold War and national security interests. In addition to the synthesis of pyrophoric and explosive compounds, Tebbe used ^{10}B NMR spectroscopy to understand the mechanism of the aggregation of boranes into the homologs B_{4}H_{10}, B_{5}H_{9}, and B_{5}H_{11}. He demonstrated that ^{10}B-enriched diborane in diethylether rapidly exchanges all ten boron positions in the anion B_{10}H_{13}^{−}. His dissertation, “Studies of Interconversions of Boron Hydrides,” was completed in 1963.

Tebbe did two years of postdoctoral work with Professor Fred Hawthorne at the University of California, Riverside. During that time, he greatly expanded the range of known carboranes to include polyhedral B_{9}C_{2}H_{11}, B_{8}C_{2}H_{10}, B_{7}C_{2}H_{9}, and B_{6}C_{2}H_{8} carboranes, the B_{7}C_{2}H_{13} system, and their derivatives.

== DuPont career ==
In the fall of 1965, Tebbe was hired by Earl Muetterties in DuPont Central Research Department, where he worked in the group of George Parshall. Earl was known to have quite broad interests and he enticed Fred to work in a variety of new areas. NMR investigation of stereochemical nonrigidity in five- six- and seven-coordinate molecules was under active study and Fred contributed to a number of those studies. Herbert Roesky was in CR&D at the time and through their sulfur chemistry, he and Tebbe established a lifelong friendship.

Tebbe began his work with Parshall on early-transition metal hydrides and the behavior of organoaluminium and organozinc reagents with early transition metal complexes. The goal of the research was to better understand heterogeneous Ziegler–Natta catalysts by independently understanding the roles of the transition metal and the aluminium alkyl promoter through more well-defined homogeneous analogs. The first paper was on the catalysis of aromatic hydrogen-deuterium exchange by metal hydrides. This was followed by a paper on hydride derivatives of niobocene and tantalocene. The two break-through papers on olefin homologation with titanium methylene compounds and titanium-catalyzed olefin metathesis appeared in 1978 and 1979 respectively, though the seminal work was recorded in Tebbe’s notebook in July 1974 (See Figure 2 in Scott and Mindiola’s tribute).

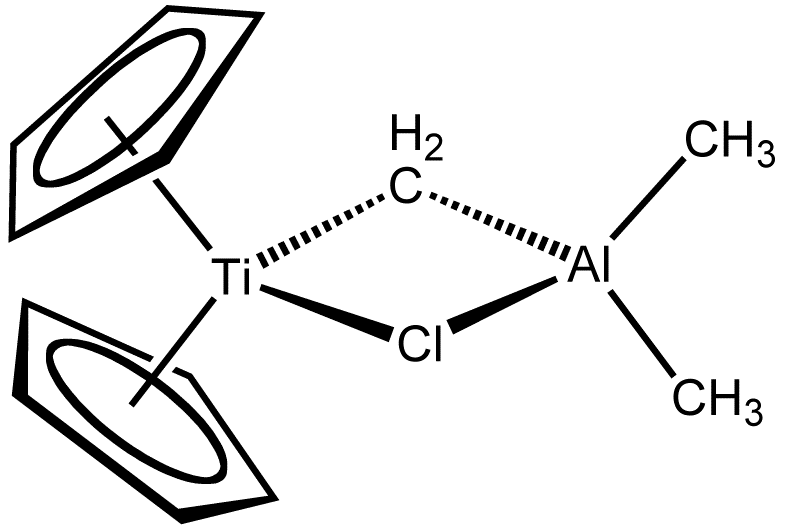
The Tebbe Reagent

In his autobiography written upon receipt of the 2005 Nobel Prize in Chemistry, Richard Schrock reminisced fondly of his short time at DuPont (1972–1974) when he shared his lab space with Tebbe. Schrock’s synthesis of (tBuCH_{2})_{3}Ta=CHtBu, the first Lewis acid-free alkylidene that ultimately led to his Nobel Prize was concurrent with the synthesis of Tebbe’s Reagent that took place just feet away. It was another Nobel laureate, Robert Grubbs, who named the reagent after Tebbe.

In related studies, Tebbe was involved in the development of catalysts for polyethylene and elastomeric polypropylene using alumina-supported bis(arene) titanium, zirconium and hafnium catalysts and tetraalkyl titanium, zirconium and hafnium catalysts. He also spent time working in the area of ceramic materials. His work on thermoplastic organoaluminium precursor of aluminium nitride allowed spinning of the precursor into fibers before sintering into aluminium nitride fibers. Aluminium alkyls allowed the preparation of aluminium hydroxide and alumina with ultra-low alpha-particle emission, suitable for ceramic memory-chip substrates for aerospace and satellite electronics.

Later in his career, Tebbe returned to fundamental studies of the elements. His work on the structure of sulfur in solution and on buckminsterfullerene are highly cited.

Tebbe was often described as a quiet individual with a self-deprecatory personality. He often deferred invitations to chemical conferences or seminars around the world because he was more comfortable in his lab. In the presence of friends, he was a lively speaker who on more than one occasion interchanged his chalk and his cigarette while excitedly describing recent results at a blackboard. Tebbe also played the role of a mentor, influencing the careers of young chemists in the organometallic group. He shared his time and expertise with younger colleagues who commented on the good fortune of those who were lucky enough to become his lab partner. After 33 years of dedicated work, Tebbe retired from DuPont in 1993 just as DuPont’s No-Smoking policies went into effect.
