= Northlake, Seattle =

Coordinates: 47°39′00″N 122°20′09″W

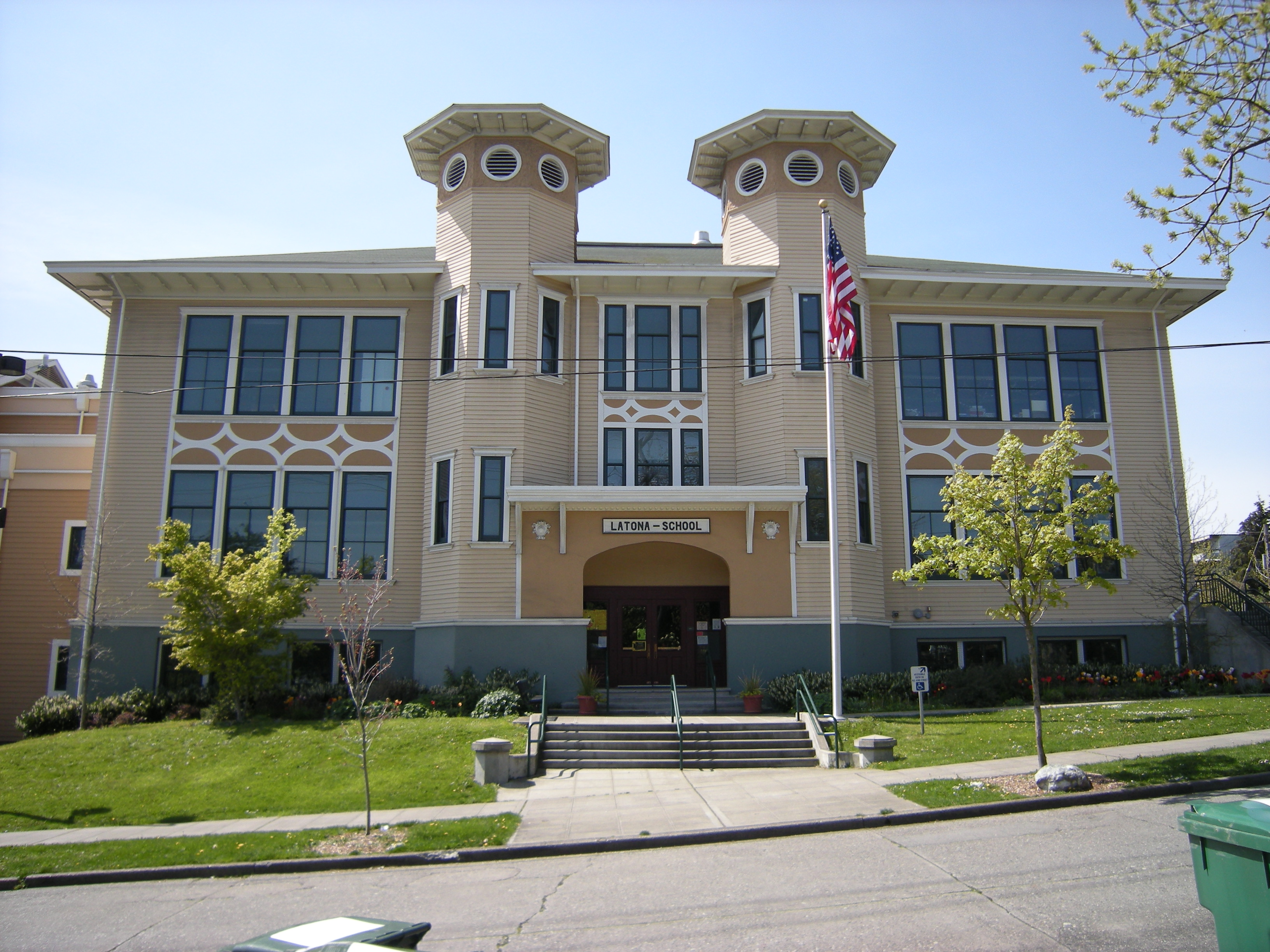
The former Latona School in Northlake, now John Stanford International School.

Northlake is a neighborhood in Seattle, Washington, that consists of the southern part of Wallingford, below N 40th Street. It is so named for being on the northern shore of Lake Union. Landmarks include the Northlake Shipyard, Gas Works Park, the Wallingford Steps art installation, and Ivar's Salmon House. Circa 1900, the eastern part of Northlake was known as Latona, and the John Stanford International School building was formerly the Latona School. Nowadays, the name Latona is likely to refer to anywhere along Latona Ave. NE from Northlake north to NE 65th St. near Green Lake.

Northlake's main thoroughfares are N 34th Street (east- and westbound), N Northlake Way and N Pacific Street (northeast- and southwest-bound), and Wallingford Avenue N and Stone Way N (north- and southbound).

== Companies and organizations ==
There are several marinas, houseboats, office buildings, and small businesses along Northlake Way on the north shore of Lake Union. This area is home to several technology companies involved in new materials research and manufacturing, including Modumetal, which produces nanolaminated materials for wear and corrosion resistance, and Energ2, which produces carbon electrodes for energy storage applications.

The Divers Institute of Technology is located near the Northlake Shipyard. Additionally, the Center for Wooden Boats maintains a warehouse and workshop adjacent to Gas Works Park.

== History ==
On November 3, 1999, Seattle resident and shipyard worker Kevin Cruz shot and killed two people and injured two others in a workplace shooting at the Northlake Shipyard. The gunman, who was described as a "loner" by neighbors and had a long history of criminal convictions, initially escaped, leading to a manhunt that included police cordoning off the surrounding area and doing a door-to-door search of the neighborhood. Cruz was finally captured and arrested about two months later on January 4, 2000.
