= Douglas Keszler =

American chemist

- Education: Southwestern Oklahoma State University (B.S.) (1979); Northwestern University (Ph.D) (1984)
- Known for: Material Chemistry; Inorganic Chemistry
- Scientific career
- Fields: Chemistry
- Workplaces: Oregon State University
- Doctoral advisor: James A. Ibers
- Website: chemistry.oregonstate.edu/keszler

Douglas A. Keszler is a distinguished professor in the Department of Chemistry at Oregon State University, adjunct professor in the Physics Department at OSU and adjunct professor in the Department of Chemistry at University of Oregon. He is also the director of the Center for Sustainable Materials Chemistry, and a member of the Oregon Nanoscience and Microtechnologies Institute (ONAMI) leadership team.

== Career ==
Keszler received his BS at Southwestern Oklahoma State University in 1979. He worked on his PhD in Northwestern University under the supervision of Prof. James A. Ibers and received his degree in 1984. He continued his career as a postdoctoral fellow at Cornell University under the supervision of Prof. Roald Hoffmann in 1984–1985.

Keszler joined the faculty of Oregon State University in 1985 as an assistant professor. He became an associate professor in 1990, professor in 1995 and distinguished professor in 2006.

== Research ==
External videos
- Sustainable chemistry center works to transform electronics manufacturing, Douglas Keszler, 2014

=== Early Research ===
Some of Keszler's early work shows the importance of his research in material science for application purposes. For example, in 2002, he worked on thin-film electroluminescent devices which display high definition monochromic color outputs, and developing them to display a full range of color. They specifically focused on phosphor Zn_{1-3x/2}Ga_{x}S:Mn and strontium sulfide codoped with copper and potassium powders which was observed to have identical emission properties as thin films. Essentially by codoping, the band gap length of a material can be tuned so that the color of the light can be adjusted. The light itself is emitted when excited electrons in the conduction band fall back down to the valence band. By manipulating the properties of crystal and defect chemistry, any color can be portrayed for display.

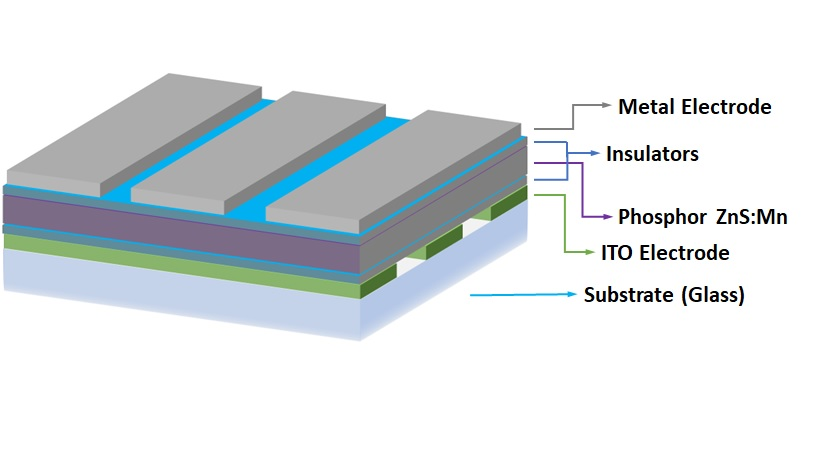
Simplified representation of the structure of thin film electroluminescent device.

Keszler has also developed a convenient method for solid synthesis. In 2001, he demonstrated a hydrothermal dehydration technique of precipitates which avoids formation of amorphous products that are created through the conventional drying process of heating. Through this method, he showed the formation of Zn_{2}SiO_{4} and SnSiO_{3}. This technique has allowed for development of materials such as powders, thin films, and luminescent materials.

In 2000, Douglas Keszler and his colleagues worked with non-linear optical materials such as Ca_{4}GdO(BO_{3})_{3}(GdCOB). They measured the Raman spectra of Ca_{4}GdO(BO_{3})_{3}(GdCOB) which was grown using the Czochralski method. This experiment was done to ultimately understand the spectroscopic features of Yb^{3+} and Nd^{3+} by analyzing vibrations of two different types of (BO_{3})^{3−} groups.

=== Recent Research ===
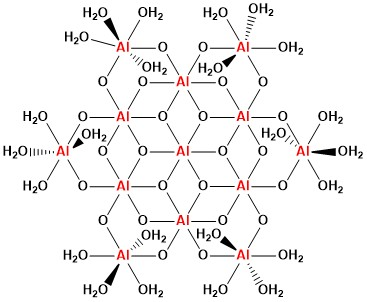
The structure of flat Al cluster,[Al_{13}(μ_{3}-OH)_{6}(μ_{2}-OH)_{18}(H_{2}O)_{24}]^{15+}

Keszler's research group focuses on the synthesis and study of inorganic molecules and materials related to next-generation electronic and energy devices. Their discovery and development on water-based chemistries for high-quality films demonstrates the leading results in the field of ultra small-scale dense nanopatterning and tunneling electronic devices. One of their recent publication in 2014 focuses on amorphous oxide semiconductor (AOS) thin-film transistors (TFTs) which are widely used in active-matrix organic light-emitting diode (AMOLED) applications, as well as active-matrix liquid crystal display (AMLCD) backplane applications. AMOLED is a display technology used in smartwatches, mobile devices, laptops, and televisions. OLED describes a specific type of think-film-display technology. TFT is a special kind of field-effect transistor made by depositing thin films of an active semiconductor layer as well as the dielectric layer and metallic contacts over a supporting but non-conducting substrate. Keszler's group discovered that indium gallium zinc oxide (IGZO) is a material-of choice for the replacement of hydrogenated silicon (a-Si:H) that is currently used in switching TFTs. IGZO comparing to hydrogenated silicon material has incredible advantages in the cost of synthesis.

Another aspect of Keszler's research demonstrates synthesis of functional inorganic materials such as high-quality inorganic films and ordered nanostructures with single-digit nanometer resolution in solution. In 2013, they came up with successful aqueous-based synthesis of ultrathin films of TiO_{2} and aqueous-derived Al_{4}O_{3}(PO_{4})_{2}(AlPO) films and were able to assemble these materials into nanolaminates. Keszler group's successful synthesis of flat cluster [Al_{13}(μ_{3}-OH)_{6}(μ_{2}-OH)_{18}(H_{2}O)_{24}]^{15+} using an electrochemical method and treating aqueous aluminum nitrate solution with a zinc metal powder at room temperature demonstrate the importance of his work to the field of water-based material synthesis. From that, they focused more on developing aqueous-based synthesis of couple other compounds such as [Sc_{2}(μ-OH)_{2}(H_{2}O)_{6}(NO_{3})_{2}](NO_{3})_{2}] from an aqueous scandium nitrate solution.

== Awards ==
Douglas Keszler has received a number of awards and honors, including the following:

- Exxon Solid-state Chemistry Award (1988)
- Alfred P. Sloan Research Fellow (1990)
- T. T. Sugihara Young Faculty Research Award (1994)
- F.A. Gilfillan Award (2001)
- OSU Researcher of the Year Award (2003)
- SWOSU Alumni Fellow (2005)
- ACS Award in the Chemistry of Materials (2017)
