= Point factor analysis =

Point factor analysis (PFA) is a systemic bureaucratic method for determining a relative score for a job. Jobs can then be banded into grades, and the grades used to determine pay. PFA is a type of job evaluation; the main advantage of PFA is that it is systemic and analytical.

Jobs are broken down into factors such as “knowledge required”. A set of closed questions in each factor break down to detail such as “level of education”. The responses to these questions are given a score, and totaled for each factor. Each factor is given a weight, and this affects the contribution made to the overall total score by that factor. Factors can be weighted according to their significance to the organization, and this allows the pay scheme to be linked to the organization’s strategy.

A critical factor in job evaluation is that it is the role that is assessed, not the person doing it. Job evaluation can be performed on roles not recruited for yet. This means that the score should be both unrelated to the person doing the job and perceived as fair.

PFA is not the only mechanism to do this analysis, as there are systems that carry out more complex calculations on the results of the questionnaire. The Hay System of Compensation is one of the most commonly used systems; it compiles scores using a complex lookup chart to weigh the factor values. Many modern schemes attempt to take better account of this. When the evaluation is performed methodically and analytically, it can provide a material factor defense in equal pay claims.

A criticism often made against PFA in isolation is that it fails to take account of external factors. Skills in high demand in the market can create a premium, as organizations have to compete for the people who have them. Some account of the skills required can be accounted for in the evaluation, but the relative number of people with those skills cannot be accounted for internally, and will change over time.
