= William C. Drinkard =

American industrial chemist

- Born: 11 May 1929
- Died: January 9, 2008 (aged 78)
- Education: University of Illinois
- Known for: Catalytic hydrocyanation
- Awards: Lavoisier Medal; ACS Award for Industrial Chemistry
- Scientific career
- Fields: Chemistry
- Workplaces: DuPont

William Charles Drinkard, Jr. (May 11, 1929 – January 9, 2008) was an American industrial chemist and the inventor of the catalytic hydrocyanation process for making adiponitrile, a key intermediate in nylon production.

== Scientific education ==
Drinkard received a Bachelor of Arts degree at Huntingdon College in 1950, followed by a Master of Science at Alabama Polytechnic Institute in 1952. He earned his Ph.D. degree at the University of Illinois in 1956. Initially, he was an assistant professor at UCLA prior to becoming an industrial research scientist at DuPont at the DuPont Experimental Station in Wilmington, Delaware.

== Scientific career ==
With impetus from research director Frank McGrew, Drinkard invented a robust nickel-based catalyst system with a co-catalyst that formed the basis of an industrial preparation of adiponitrile based on addition of hydrogen cyanide to butadiene. Further refinements of Drinkard's initial discovery by other members of DuPont's research staff led to a commercially viable catalyst composition, one that afforded significant cost advantage over the next best alternative. This innovation provided an important competitive advantage. In the chemical pathway depicted below, the letters a, b, and c indicate steps mediated by Drinkard's catalyst.

Drinkard was awarded the Lavoisier Medal of DuPont in 1997. Additionally, he received the American Chemical Society's Award for Industrial Chemistry in 1998.

== Bibliography ==
Discussions of the scientific underpinning of Drinkard's discovery can be found in the following:

- George W. Parshall, Steven D. Ittel, Homogeneous Catalysis, 2nd ed., John Wiley, New York, 1992, p. 9, p. 42, ISBN 0-471-53829-9.
- C.A. Tolman, R.J. McKinney, W.C. Seidel, J.D. Druliner, W.R. Stevens, Advances in Catalysis, Vol. 33, 1985, pp. 1–46.
- J.P. Collman, L.S. Hegedus, J.R. Norton, R.G. Finke, Principles and Applications of Organotransition Metal Chemistry, University Science Books, Mill Valley, California, 1987, pp. 568–71, ISBN 0-935702-51-2.
