= Kauffmann olefination =

Type of chemical reaction

The Kauffmann olefination is a chemical reaction to convert aldehydes and ketones to olefins with a terminal methylene group. This reaction was discovered by the German chemist Thomas Kauffmann and is related to the better known Tebbe olefination or Wittig reaction.

== Formation of the reagent ==
The reagent was generated in situ by conversion of different halogenides of molybdenum or tungsten with methyllithium at low temperatures (−78 °C).

During the warm-up process the formation of the active reagent occurs. NMR-experiments have shown that the active reagent is not a Schrock carbene (e.g. Tebbe-reagent).

== Mechanism ==
Mechanism experiments shows that the olefination process is a sequence of cycloaddition and cycloelimination steps.

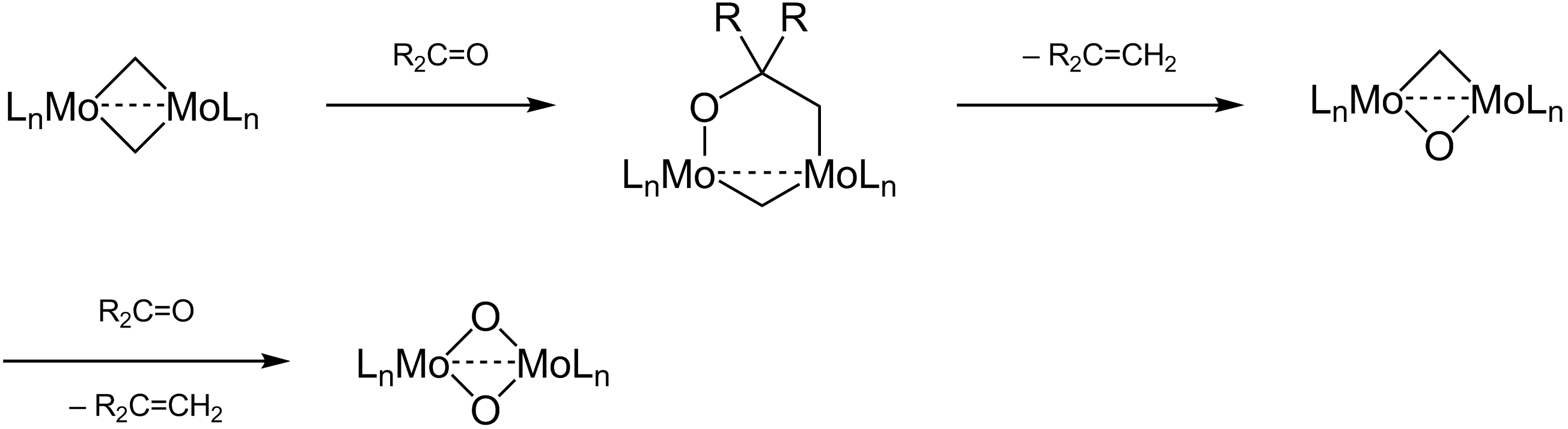

== Applications ==
For a long time this reaction had no applications in synthetic organic chemistry. In 2002 it was used in a total synthesis of the terpene gleenol as a mild and non-basic reagent in a one-pot-protocol with an olefin metathesis step with Grubbs catalyst. It is remarkable that the organometallic catalyst tolerates the inorganic reaction products.
