= Cynthia Friend =

American chemist

- Born: Hastings, Nebraska, USA
- Education: University of California, Davis (BS); University of California, Berkeley (PhD)
- Scientific career
- Fields: Heterogeneous catalysis, Surface chemistry
- Workplaces: Kavli Foundation
- Doctoral advisor: Earl Muetterties
- Website: kavlifoundation.org/people/cynthia-friend

Cynthia Marie Friend is an American chemist. She currently serves as president and chief operating officer of The Kavli Foundation. She is on leave from the Department of Chemistry and Chemical Biology at Harvard University. Friend was the first female full professor of chemistry at Harvard, attaining the position in 1989. Friend has held the Theodore William Richards Chiar in Chemistry and served as professor of materials science in the Paulson School of Engineering.

== Education ==
Friend graduated from the public Hastings High School in Nebraska in 1973. She received a Bachelor of Science with a major in chemistry from the University of California, Davis in 1977 and a Doctor of Philosophy in chemistry from the University of California, Berkeley in 1981. Her doctoral advisor was Earl Muetterties. She pursued postdoctoral research for one year the Madix Group at the Department of Chemical Engineering of Stanford University.

== Career ==
Cynthia Friend began her independent research career as an assistant professor of chemistry at Harvard University in 1982. She moved through the ranks to become the first female full professor of chemistry in 1989. Friend was appointed as the Theodore William Richards Professor of Chemistry in 1998 and as professor of materials science in the School of Engineering and Applied Sciences at Harvard in 2002. Friend has served in many leadership roles at Harvard, including as the first and only department chair in chemistry (2004–2007), as associate dean of the Faculty of Arts and Sciences (FAS) (2002–2005), and as director of the Rowland Institute (2013–2019).

Friend also served as associate director of the Department of Energy's SLAC National Accelerator Laboratory, at Stanford University (2011–2012) while on a leave from Harvard. She is currently the chair of a federal advisory committee, Basic Energy Sciences Advisory Committee (BESAC), on which she has served since 2018.

Friend was previously a senior editor of Accounts of Chemical Research, a journal of the American Chemical Society. She was also a member of the editorial board of ACS Catalysis, Chemical Science, and the Journal of the American Chemical Society and was co-editor-in-chief of the Catalysis Science & Technology journal from 2010 until 2013.

She is a member of the National Academy of Sciences, the American Academy of Arts and Sciences and a fellow of the American Association of Arts and Sciences and the American Chemical Society. Her research has focused on nano-science applied to sustainability. Friend and her group have investigated the chemical and physical properties of interfaces, by investigating important catalytic reactions and by making new materials with key chemical functionality.

Besides her scholarly work, Friend is a member of the board of directors of Bruker Instruments (BRKR).

== Kavli Foundation ==
The Kavli Foundation selected Dr. Cynthia M. Friend, Theodore Williams Richards Professor of Chemistry at Harvard University, as its president. Dr. Friend took a leave Harvard and assumed this post on January 1, 2021.

== Awards ==
- IBM Faculty Development Award, 1983‑1985
- Presidential Young Investigator Award, 1985-1990
- Union Carbide Innovation Recognition Program, 1988‑89
- Distinguished Young Alumni Award, University of California, Davis, 1990
- Agnes Fay Morgan Research Award Recipient, 1991
- American Chemical Society Garvan Medal, 1991
- Elected to Iota chapter, Phi Beta Kappa, Radcliffe College, 1992
- Langmuir Lecturer, Colloid Division of the American Chemical Society, 1995
- Alexander von Humboldt Senior Research Fellowship, 2007
- Hanse-Wissenschaftskolleg Fellowship, 2008
- Fellow, American Association of Arts and Sciences, 2009
- American Chemical Society, George C. Olah Award in Hydrocarbon Chemistry, 2009
- Fellow, American Chemical Society, 2010
- Bowdoin College Honorary Doctorate in Science, 2011
- American Chemical Society Award in Surface Chemistry, 2017
- Elected to American Academy of Arts and Sciences, 2018
- Elected to the National Academy of Sciences, 2019
