= Margaret C. Etter =

American chemist and crystallographer (1943–1992)

- Margaret C. (Peggy) Etter
- Born: Margaret Cairns; 12 September 1943; Greenville, Delaware, United States
- Died: 9 June 1992 (aged 48)
- Other name: Peggy Etter
- Education: University of Pennsylvania, University of Delaware, University of Minnesota
- Known for: Etter Rules for hydrogen bonds
- Scientific career
- Fields: Solid-state chemistry, Crystallography
- Doctoral advisor: Jack Gougoutas

Margaret Cairns Etter, known informally as Peggy Etter (12 September 1943 – 9 June 1992), was an American chemist who contributed to the development of solid state chemistry for crystalline organic compounds. She is known for her work characterizing and classifying contacts by hydrogen bonds in organic compounds. Her "enlightened imagination, innovative creativity, and unfailing enthusiasm" is recognised as having a "transformative effect" in many areas of organic chemistry.

== Education and career ==
Etter was born as Margaret Cairns in Greenville, a town in Delaware near Wilmington. Her father, Theodore L. Cairns ("Ted"), was a chemist by profession at DuPont. Etter attained her B.Sc. at the University of Pennsylvania, spending a freshman semester at Cornell (where she met future collaborator Joel Bernstein in the Mugwuamp freshman orientation group), and completed a master's degree at the University of Delaware in 1971 with Harold Kwart. Her Ph.D. research was completed at the University of Minnesota as a National Science Foundation predoctoral fellow under the supervision of Jack Gougoutas. Her thesis and postdoctoral work focused on the study of the chemical and structural properties of polyvalent iodine compounds using X-ray diffraction and spectroscopic techniques. Her Ph. D work was published and still provides a model for how topotactic reactions should be studied.

After a brief stay as an assistant professor at Augsburg College, Etter obtained employment in the Central Research Laboratories at the mile-square 3M campus in Maplewood, Minnesota, as a researcher. She collaborated with several research groups to study crystalline compounds and polymers, including molecular salts based on two photographic dyes that formed no fewer than 14 polymorphs.

Due to the difficulties of maintaining a stable research program at 3M, Etter returned to the University of Minnesota first as a postdoctoral researcher in solid state NMR with Robert Bryant, and later as professor (from 1984) at the school of chemistry. For the rest of her career she devoted herself to the investigation of the properties of crystalline solids and hydrogen bonds. Her work influenced several areas of interest in the field of solid state organic chemistry, such as crystal growth, clathrate formation, phase transitions, supramolecular chemistry and co-crystals (a term she essentially defined in the community). Much of her work was truly interdisciplinary. Etter's key contribution was the use of graph sets to analyze hydrogen bond patterns (rather than the more conventional analysis of individual bonds), a path against the prevailing attitude that hydrogen bonding in organic solids was too complicated to understand. The establishing of the "Etter Rules" was later reported in Accounts of Chemical Research "Encoding and Decoding Hydrogen Bond Patterns in Organic Compounds" which since has been cited more than 4,000 times. Such representation is widely used in structural chemistry and solid state chemistry for the description of organic compounds. The use of "Etter Rules" was reviewed (with further results incorporated) in Angewandte Chemie, and the approach was incorporated into the CSD software for automatic analysis of structures.

In April 1991 Etter was diagnosed with stage IV kidney cancer, in the most productive phase of her career that she herself described as being "on a roll". Her final appearance was on a tour of Israel to coincide with the Israel Chemical Society Annual Meeting, when she visited the Weizmann Institute and the Technion, places she had always wanted to visit due to the concentration of organic solid-state chemists. Additionally, during this visit she gave a plenary lecture on her research. Shortly after her return to the United States, Etter was placed in hospice care due to a rapid deterioration of her health. She died on June 9, 1992.

== Awards and recognition ==
In 1979, Etter received the "Good Neighbor" award from the Minnesota radio station WCCO for her contributions to the development of the school science program STEP at 3M. Her outreach work focused on improving the opportunities for women in science, lecturing on the subject to high school and college students, and serving as a role model for female undergraduate and graduate students. During her illness on Thanksgiving Day 1991, Minnesota Public Radio paid a special tribute to her.

Etter was recognized as an early pioneer in the Chemistry Department of the University of Minnesota due to the research she conducted related to "... the applications of solid-state nuclear magnetic resonance spectroscopy, the design and properties of organic non-linear optical materials, and most significantly, in the understanding and utilization of hydrogen-bonding interactions in crystals." Her work was recognized with many international awards and fellowships through her career:

- Sloan Research Fellowship (1989)
- Bush Foundation Fellowship
- Iota Sigma Pi Award for Excellence in Chemistry
- St. Paul Businessperson of the Year (1986) for her work with “Rochelle Crystal Corporation.”

In recognition of both her scientific achievements and her work as a mentor to students and novice scientists, the American Crystallographic Association launched two awards in honor of Peggy Etter: the Margaret C. Etter Early Career Award, given to scientists who have made important contributions early in their careers, and the Margaret C. Etter Student Lecturer Award, awarded to a selection of students for their oral presentations at the annual conference of the association.

In addition, the University of Minnesota holds an annual Etter Memorial Lecture and hosts an endowed lectureship in solid state chemistry and materials science bearing her name.
