= Apicophilicity =

Apicophilicity is the phenomenon in which electronegative substituents of trigonal bipyramidal pentacoordinate compounds prefer to occupy apical (axial) positions (L_{ap}).

The term "apicophilicity" was first proposed by Earl L. Muetterties in 1963 for the structural analysis of pentacoordinate phosphorus fluorides by ^{19}F NMR. Since the apical bonding of a pentacoordinate typical (group 1, 2, 13-18) element compound consists of a 3-center-4-electron bond, in which the electron density is localized on two apical substituents, an arrangement in which electronegative substituents occupy apical positions is more stable.

The apicophilicity of a substituent is defined as the difference in energy between two isomeric structures in which the substituent occupies an apical position and an equatorial position (L_{eq}). Experimentally, instead of direct measurement of the energy difference, which is usually difficult to measure, the relative energy barriers for pseudorotation of isomers are used for determination of the apicophilicity scale. Some experimental and theoretical studies have been made to measure relative apicophilicities for various substituents.

The apicophilicity of a substituent mainly depends on its electronegativity, but some other factors can also have an effect. A bulky substituent prefers equatorial positions, which are more distant from other substituents. A substituent with π-bonding ability also prefers equatorial positions. The use of multidentate ligands can also control the arrangement of substituents. For example, a bidentate ligand with a five-membered ring structure greatly stabilizes the arrangement in which their two coordination sites occupy equatorial and an apical position.

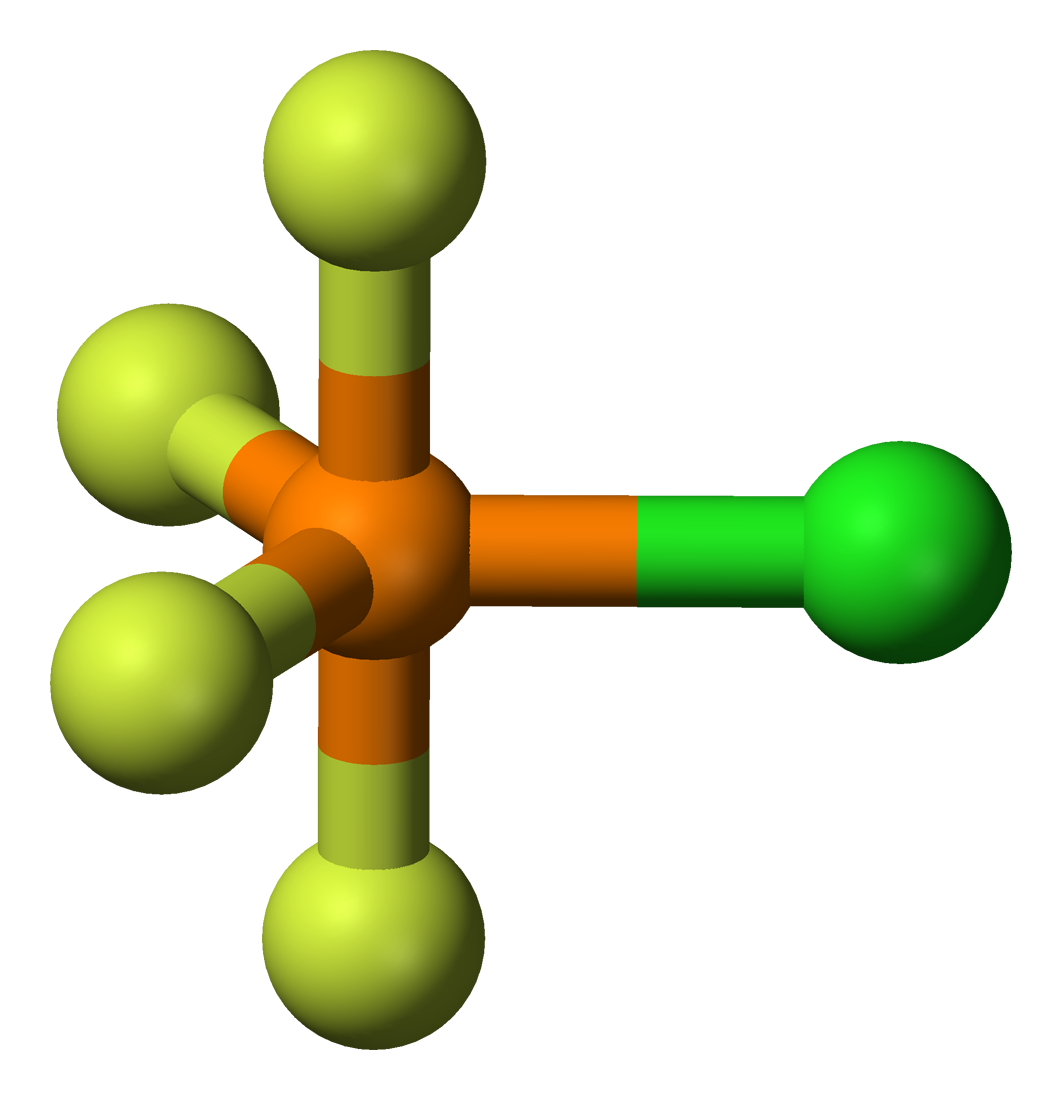
PClF_{4}

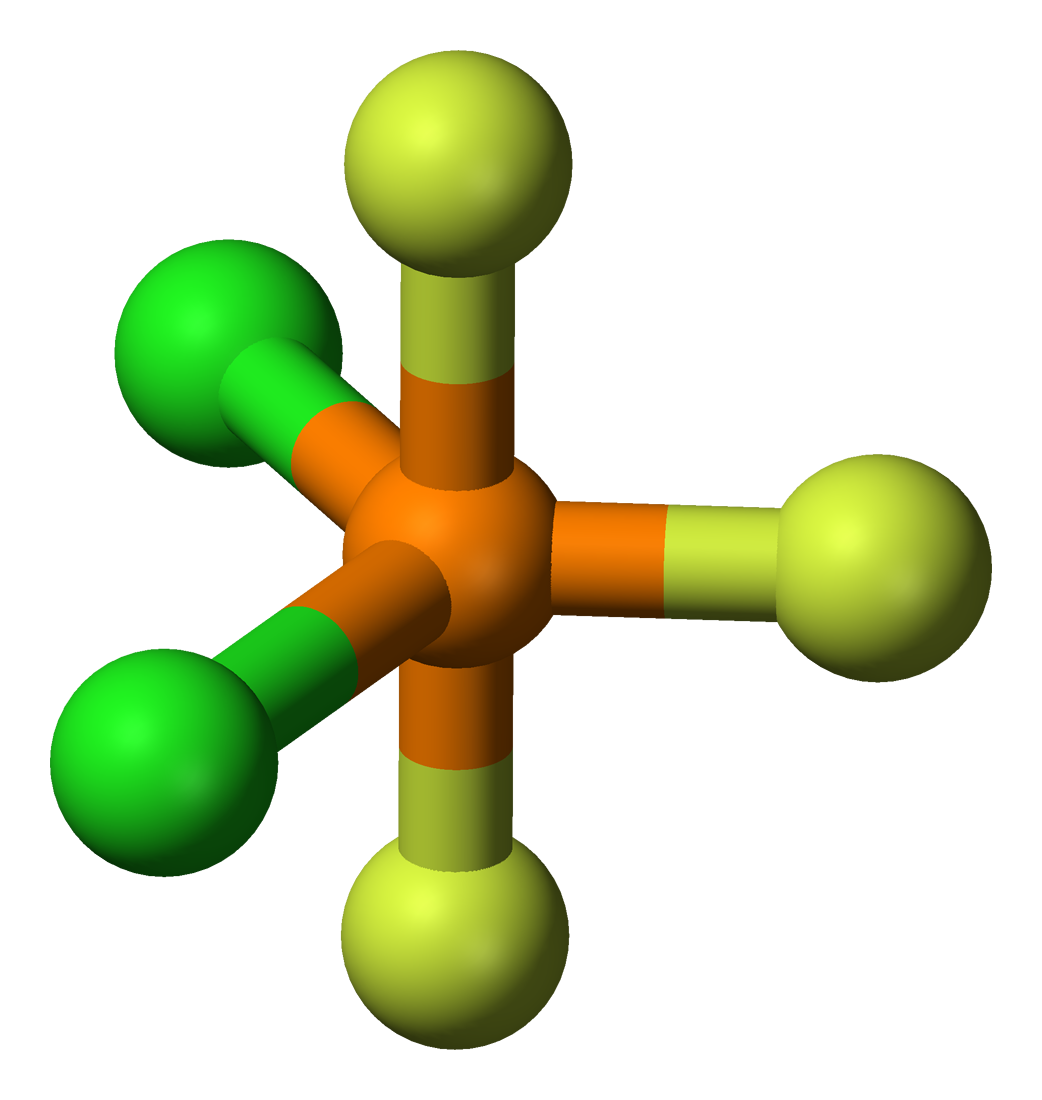
PCl_{2}F_{3}

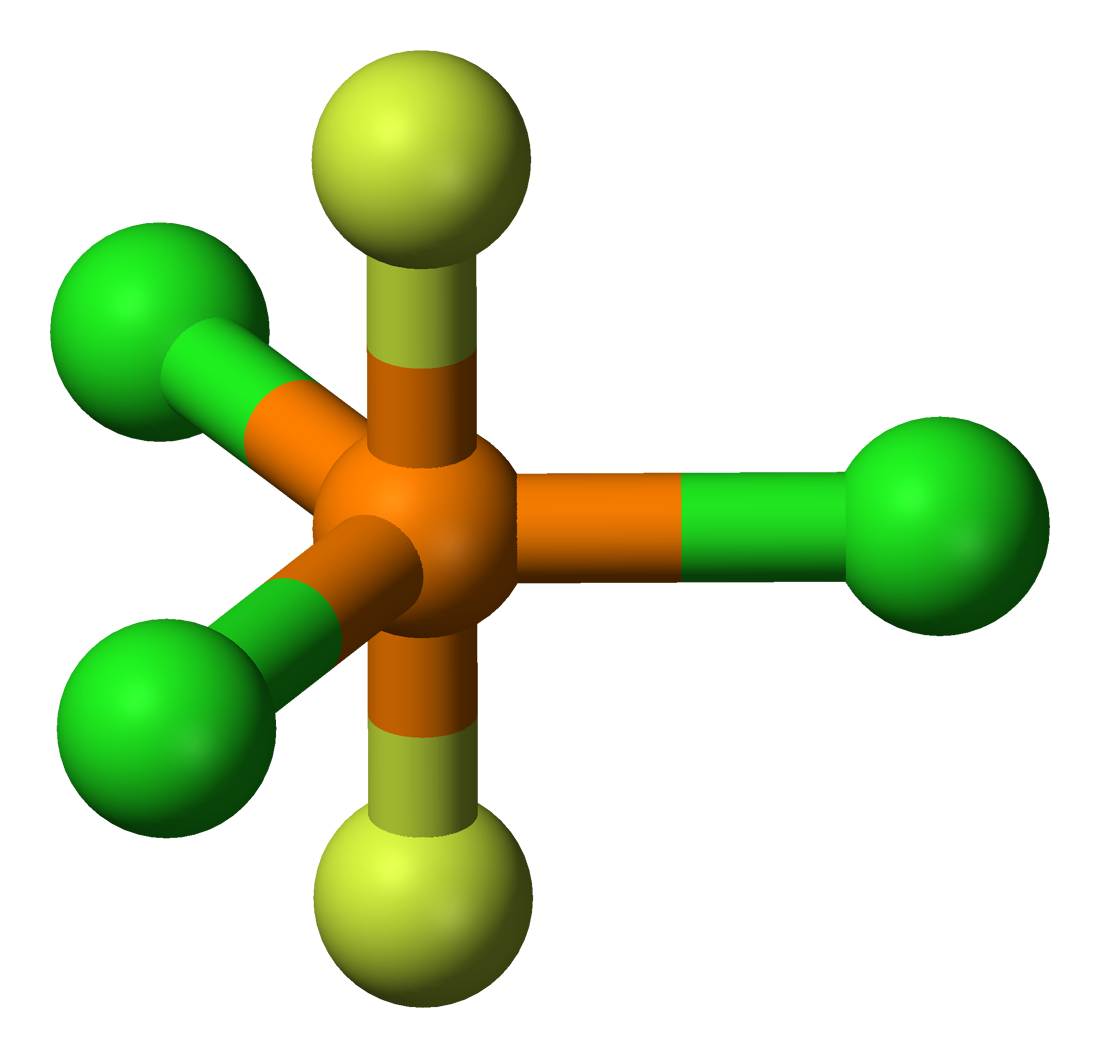
PCl_{3}F_{2}

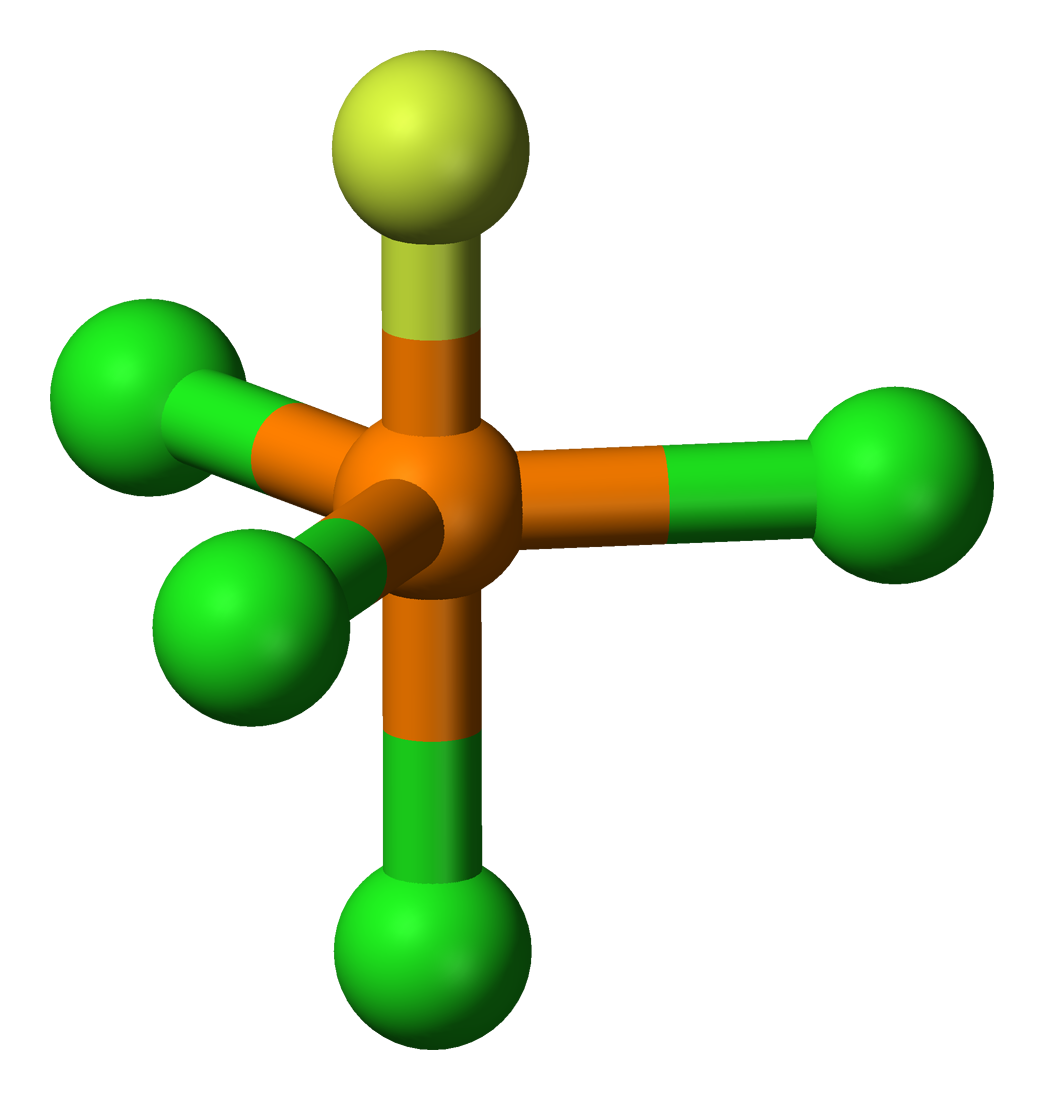
PCl_{4}F
