= William Dale Phillips =

American scientist (1925–1993)

- Born: October 10, 1925; Elgin, Illinois, United States
- Died: December 15, 1993 (aged 68); St. Louis Missouri
- Education: University of Kansas, MIT
- Known for: NMR Spectroscopy
- Awards: National Academy of Sciences
- Scientific career
- Fields: Physical chemistry
- Workplaces: U. S. Navy; DuPont Central Research; Washington University in St. Louis; Mallinckrodt; Advisors on Science and Technology
- Doctoral advisor: Richard C. Lord

William Dale Phillips (October 10, 1925 – December 15, 1993) was an American chemist, nuclear magnetic resonance spectroscopist, federal science policy advisor and member of the National Academy of Sciences.

== Training ==
Phillips graduated from public high school and immediately entered the U.S. Navy V-12 program in 1943. He studied mechanical engineering at the University of Texas at Austin, was commissioned, and left active duty in 1946. Phillips completed a bachelor's degree in chemistry in 1948 at the University of Kansas and obtained a PhD in physical chemistry at Massachusetts Institute of Technology under the direction of Richard C. Lord studying the vibrational spectra of organic molecules.

== Career ==
In 1951, Phillips joined DuPont Central Research. He held positions starting with research chemist, rising to research supervisor, manager and assistant and associate director. Phillips began to explore the nascent field of nuclear magnetic resonance (NMR). His initial interest was in molecular motion in organic systems. Together with Earl Muetterties, he also explored molecular dynamics in inorganic systems. DuPont's strength in organofluorine chemistry and cyanocarbon chemistry led to investigation of those systems. His work on paramagnetic molecule was the foundation of modern paramagnetic shift reagents and MRI imaging.

Phillips' interests then turned toward the biological. His particular interests were ferredoxins, and lysozyme. He also had a strong interest in the NMR and ESR of nucleic acids and other biological macromolecules.

To further his understanding of biochemistry, he took a DuPont Industrial Postdoctoral in 1962 to go to MIT in biochemistry. In 1973 he was on assignment from DuPont to ICI as liaison to their program to produce protein for animal feed from methane through fermentation microbiology. Retiring from DuPont Central Research in 1978, Phillips assumed the positions of chair and Charles Allen Thomas professor of chemistry in Arts and Sciences at Washington University in St. Louis.

In 1984 he joined Mallinckrodt, Inc. as senior vice-president for research and development. He accepted a role on the Bush administration's Science Advisory Board. He chaired the National Critical Technologies Panel through the National Academy of Sciences. He served on the editorial boards of several scientific journals and on the boards of directors of Mallinckrodt, Sigma-Aldrich, the Missouri Corporation for Science and Technology, the Saint Louis Science Center, the St. Louis Technology Center, and Celgene Corporation.
