= Ken Raymond =

American inorganic chemist

- Born: January 7, 1942 (age 84); Astoria, Oregon, U.S.
- Education: Reed College (B.S.) (1964); Northwestern University (Ph.D) (1968)
- Scientific career
- Fields: Inorganic Chemistry, Bioinorganic Chemistry
- Workplaces: University of California, Berkeley
- Doctoral advisor: Fred Basolo, James A. Ibers
- Doctoral students: Keith Hodgson, Rebecca Abergel, Seth M. Cohen
- Other notable students: Vy Maria Dong (postdoc)
- Website: www.cchem.berkeley.edu/knrgrp/home.html

Kenneth Norman Raymond (born January 7, 1942) is a bioinorganic and coordination chemist. He is Chancellor's Professor of Chemistry at the University of California, Berkeley, Professor of the Graduate School, the Director of the Seaborg Center in the Chemical Sciences Division at Lawrence Berkeley National Laboratory, and the President and Chairman of Lumiphore.

== Biography ==
=== Early life and education ===
Raymond was born on January 7, 1942, in Astoria, Oregon, and was raised in various towns in Oregon. After graduating from Clackamas High School in 1959, he spent a year in Germany where he worked as a test-driver for Volkswagen and developed a taste for German culture. He then attended Reed College in Portland, Oregon, where he majored in Chemistry and earned a Bachelor of Arts in 1964. Raymond then attended Northwestern University where he studied coordination chemistry and crystallography under Fred Basolo and also worked closely with James A. Ibers, earning his Ph.D. degree in 1968.

=== Academic career ===
Raymond received an appointment to the faculty in the Department of Chemistry at the University of California, Berkeley in 1967 as an assistant professor. He became an associate professor in 1974 and a full professor of chemistry in 1978. He has served as Vice Chair for the Berkeley Chemistry Department (1982−1984) and Chair (1993−1996). He was Chair of the ACS Division of Inorganic Chemistry in 1996.

Research from the Raymond group has covered a wide range of topics in inorganic chemistry, including actinide and lanthanide chemistry, microbial iron transport, and metal-based supramolecular assemblies. At the heart of his research throughout his career is a basic interest in metal-ligand specificity as understood through crystallography and solution thermodynamics.

Raymond, now a UC Berkeley Chancellor's Professor and the Director of the Glenn T. Seaborg Center at Lawrence Berkeley National Laboratory, continues to make strides in fundamental research in the fields of metals in biology and physical inorganic chemistry.

== Scientific achievements ==
=== Uranocene ===
One of the first great achievements of Raymond's independent research career was the determination of the crystal structure of uranocene (di-π-(cyclooctatetraene)uranium). This structure was a seminal discovery in the study of f-block sandwich complexes. Since this discovery, the analogous structures of several other f-block metals have been explored (including thorium and cerium from the Raymond lab).

=== Microbial iron transport ===
The study of iron transport systems in microbes and the coordination chemistry of siderophores is one of the longest running projects in the Raymond group. Several generations of students have studied the structures and solution behaviors of some of the most notable siderophores including enterobactin, desferrioxamine B, alcaligin and bacillibactin. Recently, the project has begun to explore siderophore interactions with the innate immune system during bacterial infections. Throughout the years the iron project has continued to thrive and has been said to have "more twists and turns than an Agatha Christie novel." Studies in siderophore structure, and especially ligand specificity, have inspired several other projects in the Raymond group.

=== Actinide sequestration ===
Raymond's early interest in actinides (including plutonium, uranium and others), along with his expertise with siderophores, has led to the development of actinide decorporation agents. This project is based on a fundamental understanding of coordination chemistry, in order to design ligands that are selective for and support the geometry constraints of these elements.

=== Magnetic resonance imaging ===
Efforts toward the development of siderophore-inspired gadolinium(III) chelates began in the 1980s and have led to several promising compounds for magnetic resonance imaging. These compounds are both more stable and have a higher relaxivity than commercially available compounds and are the subject of several patents. Hexadentate hydroxypyridinone (HOPO) and terephthalamide (TAM) oxygen donor chelators allow for high thermodynamic stability of complexes while allowing for two-three water molecules to be directly coordinated to the lanthanide. Research has focused on macromolecular conjugation in recent years, including a collaboration with Jean Fréchet and dendrimers developed in his laboratory.

=== Lanthanide luminescence ===
Other lanthanide coordination compounds have been developed to serve as luminescent reporters in time-resolved bioassays. As experts in ligand design, the Raymond group has been able to develop ligands that optimize the luminescence of several lanthanides (particularly terbium and europium), leading to an array of brilliantly emissive complexes. Due to their remarkable properties, these compounds have been commercialized by Lumiphore.

=== Supramolecular assemblies ===
Naphthalene-M_{4}L_{6} cluster

Based on a predictive strategy, the Raymond group has developed several self-assembled, metal-ligand clusters of high symmetry. Some of these clusters, including the naphthalene-M_{4}L_{6} workhorse cluster (see image), have a cavity within the cluster that can encapsulate a variety of guest molecules. In collaboration with Robert G. Bergman, the unique reaction chemistry of these host–guest assemblies has been explored. Recent work on this project, which led to a paper in Science, has demonstrated unprecedented host–guest reaction rate accelerations reminiscent of enzyme kinetics.

== Honors ==
- Alfred P. Sloan Research Fellow (1971–1973)
- Miller Research Professor (1977–1978, 1996, 2004)
- Guggenheim Fellow (1980–1981)
- Selected as one of the "Technology 100, 1981" by Technology Magazine
- American Association for the Advancement of Science Fellow (1984)
- Department of Energy Ernest O. Lawrence Award (1984)
- Lawrence Berkeley National Laboratory Technology Transfer award (1988, 1991)
- Humboldt Research Award for Senior U.S. Scientists (1992)
- American Chemical Society Alfred Bader Award in Bioinorganic or Bioorganic Chemistry (1994)
- Erskine Fellow, University of Canterbury, New Zealand (1997)
- Elected to National Academy of Sciences (1997)
- Basolo Medal, Northwestern University (1997)
- Max-Planck-Institut fur Strahlenchemie "Frontiers in Biological Chemistry" Award (1997)
- Elected to the American Academy of Arts and Sciences (2001)
- Reed College Howard Vollum Award (2002)
- ACS Auburn Section G. M. Kosolapoff Award (2004)
- Izatt-Christensen Award in Macrocyclic Chemistry (2005). A competitive award which recognizes excellence in macrocyclic chemistry. The award was founded by Reed McNeil Izatt and James. J. Christensen.
- Joe L. Franklin Memorial Lectureship (2006)
- Paulo Fasella Lectureship (2006)
- UC Berkeley Chancellor's Professor, (2007–present)
- ACS award in inorganic chemistry, sponsored by Aldrich Chemical Co., Inc. (2008)
- Bailar Award and Lectureship, University of Illinois Urbana-Champaign (2009)
