= Seth Cohen (chemist) =

American chemist

Seth M. Cohen
- Education: Stanford University (B.S., B.A., 1994); University of California, Berkeley (Ph.D., 1998)
- Awards: Arthur C. Cope Scholar Award (2016), Centenary Prize (2025), Fellow of the American Chemical Society (2015), Fellow of the Royal Society of Chemistry (2014), DARPA Meritorious Public Service Medal (2023), Hillebrand Prize (2024)
- Scientific career
- Fields: Inorganic chemistry; Materials chemistry; Medicinal chemistry
- Workplaces: University of California San Diego (2001–present)
- Doctoral advisor: Kenneth N. Raymond
- Other academic advisors: Stephen J. Lippard (postdoc)
- Website: cohenlab.ucsd.edu

Seth M. Cohen is a Distinguished Professor of Chemistry and Biochemistry at the University of California, San Diego. He is known for research on metal–organic frameworks, including postsynthetic modification, and for metalloenzyme inhibitor discovery. From 2019 to 2023 he served as a Program Manager in the Biological Technologies Office at the Defense Advanced Research Projects Agency (DARPA).

== Education ==
Cohen earned a B.S. in Chemistry and a B.A. in Political Science from Stanford University in 1994. He received a Ph.D. in Chemistry from the University of California, Berkeley in 1998 under Kenneth N. Raymond. He was an NIH Postdoctoral Fellow with Stephen J. Lippard at the Massachusetts Institute of Technology from 1999 to 2001.

== Career ==
Cohen joined the faculty of the University of California San Diego in 2001 and was promoted to Professor in 2011. He served as Chair of the Department of Chemistry and Biochemistry from 2012 to 2015. From 2019 to 2023 he served as a Program Manager in DARPA's Biological Technologies Office.

== Research ==
Cohen's research spans inorganic, bioinorganic, and materials chemistry. His group helped establish postsynthetic modification methods for metal–organic frameworks and has applied MOFs and MOF–polymer composites to separations and catalysis. The lab also develops metalloprotein inhibitors using new metal-binding pharmacophores.

== Awards and honors ==
- Cottrell Scholar Award, Research Corporation for Science Advancement (2004).
- NSF CAREER Award (2006).
- Fellow of the American Association for the Advancement of Science (2013).
- Fellow of the Royal Society of Chemistry (2014).
- Fellow of the American Chemical Society (2015).
- Arthur C. Cope Scholar Award, American Chemical Society (2016).
- TREE/STAR Award, Research Corporation for Science Advancement (2017).
- DARPA Meritorious Public Service Medal (2023).
- Hillebrand Prize, Chemical Society of Washington (2024).
- Centenary Prize for Chemistry and Communication, Royal Society of Chemistry (2025).

== Selected publications ==
- S. M. Cohen, "Postsynthetic methods for the functionalization of metal–organic frameworks," Chemical Reviews 112 (2012): 970–1000.
