= Divers Institute of Technology =

Private, commercial educational institution for the training of commercial divers

Divers Institute of Technology Logo

Divers Institute of Technology (DIT) is a private, for-profit educational institution for the training of commercial divers and located in Seattle, Washington. Founded in 1968 in Seattle, Washington, Divers Institute of Technology is located on the North end of Lake Union near Gas Works Park in the Wallingford district.

The seven-month program consists of 900 hours, including dive time. There are twelve classes per calendar year, with a new class starting each month. From July 1, 2006, to June 30, 2007, the average number of students per class was 23, with a retention rate of 90%. It is estimated that 10% of the students are women.

Divers Institute is one of only two dive schools in the U.S. to grant students the Canadian Standards Association Unrestricted Surface Supplied Air Diver Certification, issued by the Diver Certification Board of Canada, allowing graduates to dive internationally.

== History ==
One of the graduating classes from Divers Institute, 1973

Divers Institute of Technology was founded in 1968, by John Manlove, U.S. Navy (Ret.), and Leiter Hockett, a local shipwright and underwater construction contractor. The school was situated on barge #41 of the Lake Union ship canal. The program initially consisted of 14 weeks of training, increasing to 16 weeks in 1975. Its goal was "to ensure that all apprentice divers hold the essential, core skills necessary to compete in the commercial diving industry, whether it's in the inland or offshore sector."

The 1970s and 1980s saw a rising need for repair to U.S. inland infrastructures, such as bridges, dams, power plants, and port facilities. In response to this industry demand and to changing technologies, Divers Institute broadened its curriculum to incorporate the unique requirements of the inland diving community. Subjects such as Non-Destructive Testing and hazardous materials handling were integrated, the welding and cutting programs were expanded, and the new technology of hydraulic tool training was added.

In June 1985, barge #41 sank. Instructors and students spearheaded the salvage effort to retrieve equipment and records, while the school continued to operate on a full-time schedule. Divers Institute was relocated onshore along the Lake Union ship canal in 1990, where it began training on the current seven-month program schedule.

Throughout its history, the ownership of Divers Institute has had a significant effect on its development. Letier Hockett, one of the school's founders, sold his holdings to Jack Blispinghof, who became instrumental in obtaining accreditation from the Accrediting Commission of Career Schools and Colleges (ACCSC). In 1975, Blispinghof sold to Chuck Litzo. Litzo and original founder John Manlove then increased the program from 16 to 26 weeks of training, allowing Canadian students to qualify for financial aid. In 1985, Manlove and Litzo sold the school to John Ritter, U.S. Navy (Ret.) and Norval Duncan in 1985, who expanded the program yet again, from 26 to 30 weeks.

In 1998, Divers Institute was purchased by its current owners, Bruce Banks and Jack Ringleberg, who have sought to update the school's training and facilities, with the mission "to provide advanced technical training that produces the most qualified, skilled professionals in the constantly evolving underwater marine industry." Banks is a retired U.S. Navy Commander and President of Jamestown Marine Services, Inc in Groton, Connecticut. Ringleberg is also U.S. Navy (Ret.) and PE President of JMS Naval Architects and Salvage Engineers, in Mystic, Connecticut.

In September 2003, Divers Institute of Technology was audited by the Diver Certification Board of Canada (DCBC) and found to be in compliance with CSA 275.4. This certification is fully recognized by the Health and Safety Executive (HSE) of the United Kingdom and the Australian Diver Accreditation Scheme (ADAS), and all other diving and national certifying regulatory agencies having reciprocity agreements with the aforementioned authorities. Divers Institute is the first diving program in the U.S. to reach this goal.

In March 2011, campus relocated to a newer facility at the north end of Lake Union, in the Seattle neighborhood of Wallingford.

== Campus ==
Divers Institute of Technology's training facility is located in the Seattle neighborhood of Wallingford, in the Northlake area on the north end of Lake Union. Dock and land-based facilities provide protected moorage for floating classrooms and submerged diving projects. All on-campus dives are conducted in natural underwater environments.

Portions of the training program require students to dive at greater depths, and in a variety of visibility and temperature conditions. These dives are conducted under instructor supervision at various locations around the Puget Sound. For the deep dives series required for international certification, students are taken out on the school's 63-foot diving vessel, which is equipped with a multi-place decompression chamber.

== Training ==
The 900-hour program includes training in the following subjects: physics, basic dive medicine, CPR, First Aid, hyperbaric chamber, dive suit components and operation, rigging, instruction in inland and offshore diving, HazMat procedures, underwater welding, hydraulic tools, salvage, SCUBA, open water deep dives, and introductory mixed gas/saturation diving.

Upon completion of the program, graduates may earn the following certifications, if they meet the requirements set forth by each certifying authority while in school:

- Canadian Standards Association (CSA) Unrestricted Surface Supplied Air Diver Certification, issued by the Divers Certification Board of Canada (DCBC)
- First Aid, CPR, Oxygen provider, A.E.D. and Blood Pathogens Certification
- Hazardous Waste Materials (HazMat) 80-hour OSHA 29 CFR 1910.120 and WAC 40-hour HAZWOPPER Certification
- SDI Open Water SCUBA Certification
- Kirby Morgan Hat Operator Certification
- API Rigger; Chevron USA API 2D (RP2D) (REV-6) Certification
- Job Safety Analysis (JSA) certificate

== Faculty ==
A significant number of the instructors at Divers Institute of Technology are former U.S. military. In 2008, of the 19 instructors on staff, 14 were veterans: nine U.S. Navy (Ret.), three U.S. Marine Corps (Ret.), one U.S. Army (Ret.), one U.S. Air Force (Ret.).

Three instructors reached the rating of U.S. Navy Master Diver prior to retirement: Gary Chancellor, Director of Training; Frank LaQue, Director of International Programs; and Hy Spalding, instructor.

Instructor Willy Wilson, U.S. Navy (Ret.).

== Accreditation ==
DIT is accredited by the Accrediting Commission of Career Schools and Colleges (ACCSC). This commission is listed by the U.S. Department of Education as a nationally recognized accrediting agency under the provisions of Chapter 33, Title 38, U.S. Code and subsequent legislation.

== In the media ==
Former DIT instructor, Richard "Rags" Radecki, U.S. Navy (Ret.) (Center), assists Robert De Niro (Left) on the set of Men of Honor.

In 2000, 20th Century Fox commissioned Divers Institute of Technology to assist in the production of Men of Honor, the story of the U.S. Navy's first African-American Master Diver, Carl Brashear. Technical support was provided for filming on location in Portland and Rainier, Oregon. Several cast members, including Cuba Gooding, Jr. and Robert De Niro trained with DIT faculty and staff in the summer of 1999 on the Seattle campus. The actors and crew were taught about the historic Mark V dress (common in Brashear's time), and its operation. Prop and set directors for the film borrowed over 200 items from Divers Institute, including helmets, Mark V umbilicals, canvas suits, dive knives, and dive station equipment.

Divers Institute of Technology has also been asked by the U.S. Coast Guard and local law enforcement to assist in investigations. In February, 2009, the U.S. Coast Guard asked DIT to assist in an inflation test to evaluate the condition of a life raft from the fatal sinking of the fishing vessel Katmai in October, 2008.

Divers Institute of Technology Executive Director, John Paul Johnston is frequently consulted for articles in popular press regarding the commercial diving industry, including the national job market and specialization within the field.
