= James A. Ibers =

James Ibers
- Born: Los Angeles, California
- Education: California Institute of Technology
- Known for: X-ray crystallography solid state chemistry
- Awards: ACS Award in Inorganic Chemistry, Linus Pauling Award, Bailar Medal, Martin J. Buerger Award from the American Crystallographic Association, National Academy of Sciences, American Academy of Arts and Science, Fellow of the American Association for the Advancement of Science
- Scientific career
- Fields: Inorganic Chemistry
- Workplaces: Northwestern University, Shell Oil Company, Brookhaven National Laboratory
- Thesis: (1951)
- Doctoral advisor: Verner F. Schomoker, James Holmes Sturdivant
- Doctoral students: Douglas Keszler, Thomas Albrecht-Schönzart, Ken Raymond, Richard Eisenberg, Steven Ittel

James A. Ibers was the Charles E. and Emma H. Morrison Professor of Chemistry before becoming an emeritus professor of chemistry at Northwestern University upon retirement. He is recognized for contributions to inorganic chemistry, especially in the areas of coordination chemistry, bio-inorganic chemistry, solid state synthesis and X-ray crystallography. Ibers passed on December 14, 2021, at the age of 91.

== Education ==
Ibers received his B.S. and Ph.D. degrees at California Institute of Technology. His thesis, awarded in 1954, was done under the direction of Verner F. Schomoker and James H. Sturdivant.

== Career ==
After graduation, Ibers accepted a staff scientist position at Shell Development Company and later Brookhaven National Laboratory. Starting in 1965 until his retirement, Ibers was a professor of chemistry at Northwestern University. His broad research interests included many aspects of organometallic, bioinorganic, and solid state chemistry. Ibers was a noted pioneer in the applications of X-Ray Crystallography to chemical problems and issues associated with inorganic bonding.
