= Thomas Albrecht =

American chemical researcher (born 1971)

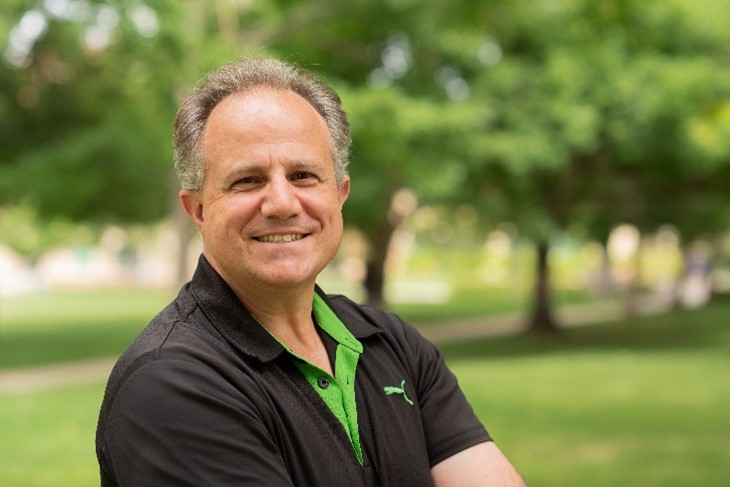
- Born: Thomas Albrecht; 1971 (age 54–55); Hershey, Pennsylvania, U.S.
- Education: Northwestern University
- Known for: Chemistry and Physics of Lanthanides and Actinides, Late Actinide Chemistry, especially with berkelium, californium, einsteinium, and fermium
- Awards: ACS Glenn T. Seaborg Award for Nuclear Chemistry, ACS Nobel Signature Award for Graduate Education in Chemistry, ACS Southern Chemist Award, ACA M. J. Buerger Award
- Scientific career
- Workplaces: Colorado School of Mines/Idaho National Laboratory; Florida State University; University of Notre Dame; Auburn University

Thomas Albrecht is an American radiochemist specializing in the chemistry and physics of transuranium elements. He is jointly appointed as a University Distinguished Professor at the Colorado School of Mines in Golden, Colorado, and Director of the Nuclear Science & Engineering Center and as a scientist at Idaho National Laboratory and Los Alamos National Laboratory.

== Education and career ==
Thomas Albrecht received his undergraduate education in chemistry at Southwest Minnesota State University, during which time he also performed research at Texas A&M with J. P. Fackler on gold chemistry and Ron Caple on organometallic chemistry at the University of Minnesota-Duluth via REU-NSF programs. He received his doctorate in inorganic chemistry in 1997 from Northwestern University under James Ibers where he studied the synthesis, structures, and reactivity of transition metal polychalcogenides. Following a postdoctoral position at the University of Illinois in 1998 with J. R. Shapley on metal-fullerene chemistry, he became an assistant professor at Auburn University later that year, transitioning to associate professor in 2002 and full professor in 2007. While at Auburn, he built a large program dedicated to understanding the chemistry and physics of f-block compounds. He opened the first new transuranium laboratory in decades in the U.S. while at Auburn, and continued this theme as the Frank M. Freimann Chair at the University of Notre Dame from 2009 to 2012. He moved to Florida State University in 2012 to become the first Gregory R. Choppin Chair in Chemistry. In 2022 he joined the faculty at the Colorado School of Mines in Golden, Colorado, and was part of the inaugural group of University Distinguished Professors.

== Research ==
Prof. Albrecht directs a research group at the Colorado School of Mines in radio- and nuclear chemistry as well as the chemistry and physics of critical materials. In 2016 he received federal funding from the U.S. Department of Energy through the Office of Basic Energy Sciences as part of the Energy Frontier Research Center program to establish the Center for Actinide Science & Technology (CAST), a multi-institution research center dedicated to advancing our understanding of how electronic structure and bonding control the properties of radioactive materials, with focus on alleviating the environmental impacts of nuclear power and the Cold War.

His research focuses on the use of synthetic, crystallographic, and spectroscopic techniques and quantum chemical simulation to better understand the nature of bonding and physical properties in lanthanides and actinides complexes. Prof. Albrecht is particularly known for his research on the chemistry of highly radioactive and scarce heavy actinides such as berkelium and californium.

=== Awards and honors ===
In 2019 Prof. Albrecht was awarded the Glenn T. Seaborg Award in Nuclear Chemistry for outstanding contributions to nuclear and radiochemistry at the American Chemical Society meeting in Orlando, Florida. The focus of this award was his group's discovery of a fundamental break in the chemistry of actinides that begins at californium. His group is responsible for the majority of transuranium single crystal structures and was the first to apply the use of microdiffraction techniques to compounds of these elements. His team was also the first to report the single crystal structure of a berkelium compound. He was in 2015 elected as a fellow of the Royal Society of Chemistry for contributions including his pioneering work on californium. In 2018, Prof. Albrecht was elected a fellow of the American Association for the Advancement of Science and was the preceptor for the ACS Nobel Signature Prize for Graduate Education in Chemistry. He has delivered a number of important endowed lectures throughout the world including the Gerhard and Lisolette Closs Memorial Lecture at the University of Chicago and the George Fischer Baker Lecture at Cornell University. In 2024, he was awarded the M. J. Buerger Award for contributions of exceptional distinction in areas of interest to the American Crystallographic Association.

== Select publications ==
- SH Cho, B Ma, SBT Nguyen, JT Hupp, TE Albrecht-Schmitt, A metal–organic framework material that functions as an enantioselective catalyst for olefin epoxidation (2006), Chemical communications, Issue 24, Pages 2563-2565
- L Zhu, D Sheng, C Xu, X Dai, MA Silver, J Li, P Li, Y Wang, Y Wang, Identifying the Recognition Site for Selective Trapping of ^{99}TcO_{4}^{–} in a Hydrolytically Stable and Radiation Resistant Cationic Metal–Organic Framework, (2017) Journal of the American Chemical Society
