= Theodore L. Cairns =

American chemist

Theodore L. Cairns (July 20, 1914 – September 26, 1994) was an American chemist, a member of the National Academy of Sciences, a research scientist at DuPont Central Research, known for his contributions to U.S. scientific policy and applications of chemistry. Cairns was the director of the Central Research Department of E. I. du Pont de Nemours and Company. He was also the chair of the Division of Chemistry and Chemical Technology of the National Research Council, on President Richard Nixon's Science Policy Task Force and Nixon's Science Advisory Committee. His daughter Margaret C. Etter became a noted chemist in her own right, conducting her research at the University of Minnesota.

== Awards and distinctions ==
- The City of Wilmington's Outstanding Citizen Award, 1963
- The American Chemical Society Award for Creative Work in Synthetic Organic Chemistry, 1968
- SOCMA (Society of Chemical Manufacturers Association) Medal for Creative Research in Synthetic Organic Chemistry, 1968
- Honorary Doctor of Laws degree, University of Alberta, 1970
- Perkin Medal, American section of the Society of Chemical Industry, 1973
- Elliott Cresson Medal, The Franklin Institute, 1974

== Notable government assignments ==
- The Delaware Governor's Council on Science and Technology, 1969-72
- President Nixon's Science Policy Task Force, 1969
- The President's Science Advisory Committee, 1970-73
- The President's Committee on the National Medal of Science, 1974-75
- The Polytechnic Institute of New York Advisory Council for Chemistry, 1976-78
