= George Parshall =

American chemist (1929–2019)

George W. Parshall
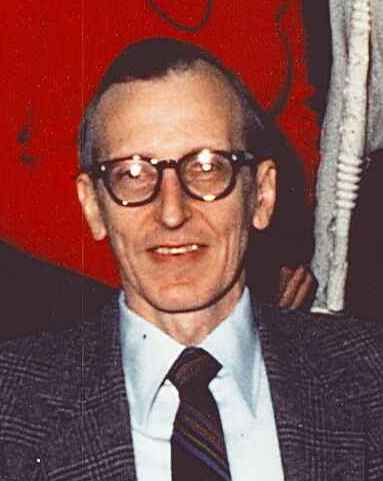
- George Parshall in late 1980
- Born: September 19, 1929; Hackensack, Minnesota
- Died: July 28, 2019 (aged 89); Milford, Delaware, United States
- Education: University of Minnesota, University of Illinois
- Known for: organometallic chemistry and homogeneous catalysis
- Awards: American Institute of Chemists Gold Medal (1995)
- Scientific career
- Fields: Organometallic Chemistry
- Workplaces: DuPont Central Research
- Thesis: (1963)
- Doctoral advisor: Reynold C. Fuson

Signature
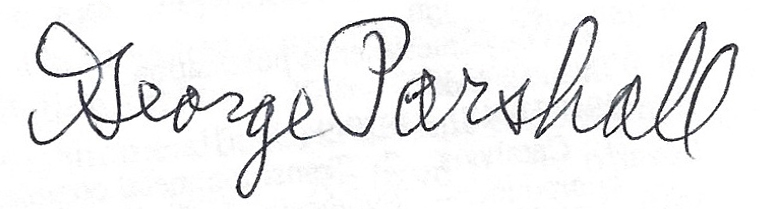

George W. Parshall (September 19, 1929 – July 28, 2019) was an American organometallic chemist who made notable contributions to homogeneous catalysis. He was a senior scientist at E. I. du Pont de Nemours and Company for many years.

== Personal and educational background ==
Born in Hackensack, Minnesota, Parshall received a Bachelor of Science degree with highest distinction from the University of Minnesota in 1951. He received his Ph.D. in Organic Chemistry from the University of Illinois in 1954 under the direction of Reynold C. Fuson. In 1954, he joined Central Research Department at du Pont Experimental Station, where he rose to Director of Chemical Sciences. He took two industrial sabbaticals, one at Imperial College London in 1960-61 and another at University of Oxford in 1986. He was a visiting Ipatieff Lecturer at Northwestern University of the fall of 1994. Parshall is a member of the American Academy of Arts and Sciences, the New York Academy of Sciences, the National Academy of Sciences, Phi Beta Kappa, Phi Lambda Upsilon and Sigma Xi.

Parshall is a member of the Guild of Scholars of The Episcopal Church. He married Naomi B. Simpson on October 9, 1954.

== Professional career and technical contributions ==
Parshall was a senior manager at du Pont during an era of rapid development and commercialization of organometallic chemistry and homogeneous catalysis. He directed the work of 50 to 100 DuPont scientists, including that of Fred Tebbe and Richard Schrock. The activation of carbon-hydrogen bonds was a recurring theme of his own research. He conducted research on the use of molten salts in catalysis and initiated work on organolanthanide chemistry. He conducted early studies related to nitrogen fixation. He was most closely associated with the DuPont processes for making critical polymer intermediates used in producing nylon and polyester and spandex. Parshall coauthored a textbook on “Homogeneous Catalysis” with Steven Ittel. Parshall also directed the development of alternatives to the chlorofluorocarbons (CFCs) used in refrigerators and air conditioners.

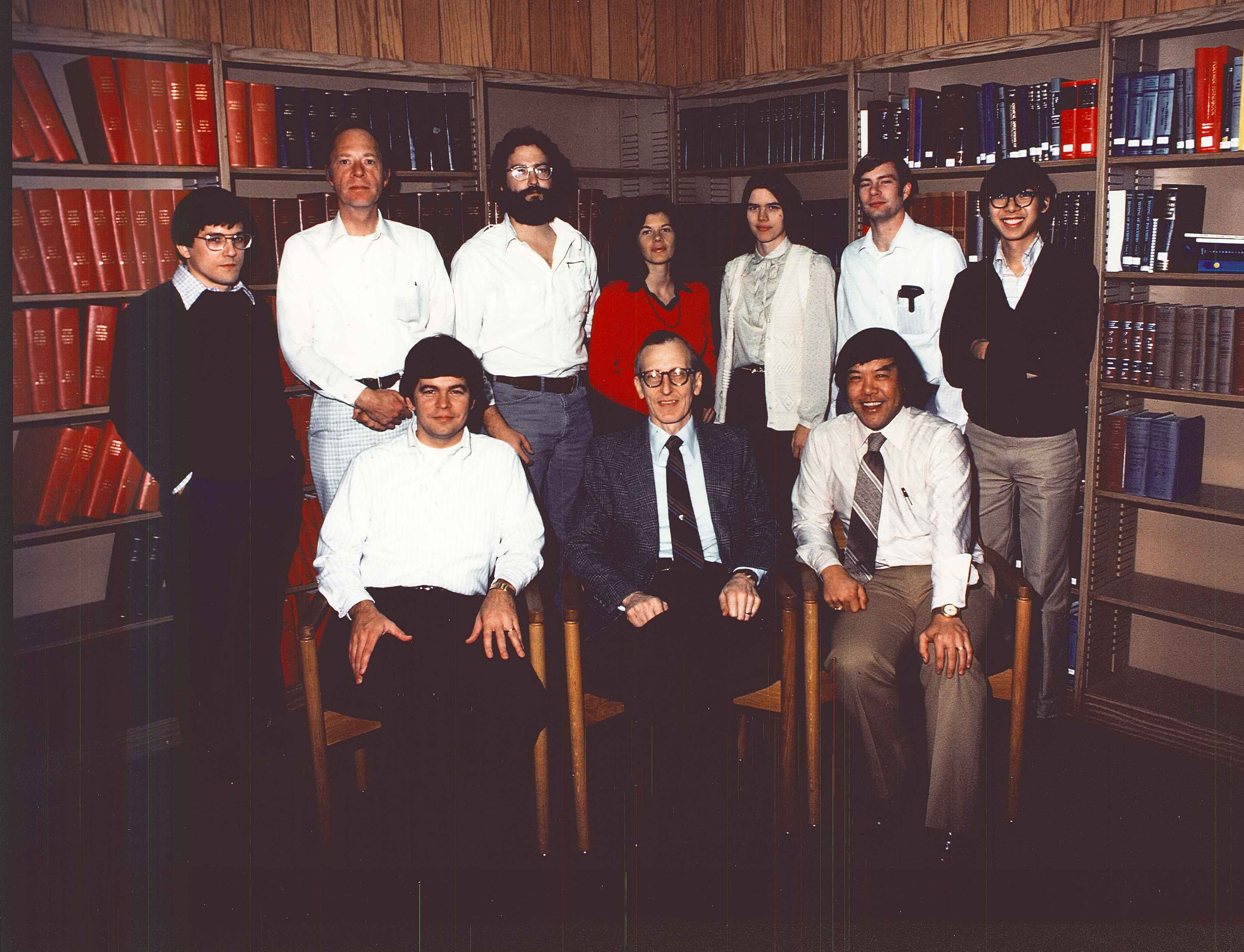
The Parshall organometallic subgroup in late 1980. Standing Jeffery S. Thompson, Frederick N. Tebbe, Thomas H. Tulip, Patricia L Watson, Karin J. Karel, David L. Thorn and Wilson Tam. Seated: Steven D. Ittel, George W. Parshall, Donnie J Sam

When Parshall retired from DuPont in 1992, he joined the effort to destroy chemical weapon stockpiles in the United States and across the world. As a member of the National Research Council’s “Stockpile Committee,” he has played a role in advising the U.S. Army in its ongoing effort to safely destroy chemical weapons. The Chemical Weapons Convention called for the destruction of these chemicals, which generally fell into three types.
