= Steven Ittel =

American chemist

Steven D. Ittel
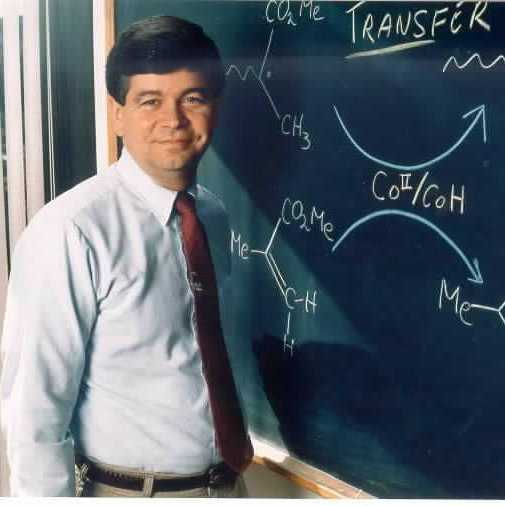
- Born: 1946 (age 79–80); Hamilton, Ohio, USA
- Education: Miami University; Northwestern University
- Known for: Homogeneous catalysis and organometallic chemistry
- Scientific career
- Fields: Inorganic chemistry
- Workplaces: DuPont Central Research

Steven Dale Ittel (born 1946 in Hamilton, Ohio) is an American chemist specializing in organometallic chemistry and homogeneous catalysis.

== Training ==
Ittel attended Miami University in Oxford, Ohio, where he received a bachelor's degree in chemistry in 1968. He was then commissioned as an officer in the United States Public Health Service and studied photochemical smog in the New York City metropolitan area from 1968 to 1970. He attended Northwestern University, where he received his PhD in chemistry under the direction of James A. Ibers in 1974.

== Career ==
Ittel worked on hydride activation of lanthanides for Systems for Nuclear Auxiliary Power (SNAP) at Monsanto's Mound Laboratories for a short time. Upon receiving his PhD from Northwestern University, he joined DuPont’s Central Research Department at the Experimental Station in Wilmington, Delaware.

Ittel is best known for his contributions to organometallic chemistry and homogeneous catalysis. He discovered fluxional processes in both diamagnetic and paramagnetic π-allyl organometallic complexes bearing M-H-C agostic interactions. He was responsible for a series of C-H activation reactions based upon fleeting zero-valent iron complexes bearing bidentate phosphorus ligands.

While working on the air oxidation of cyclohexane to adipic acid (an intermediate in the preparation of nylon-66) he discovered a series of bis(pyridylimino)isoindoline complexes of cobalt to be very effective catalysts for the decomposition of the intermediate cyclohexylhydroperoxide. He led and contributed to DuPont’s technology for cobalt-catalyzed chain transfer in acrylic radical polymerization. The resulting macromonomers are utilized commercially in a broad range of automotive finishes.

As a manager at DuPont, he directed the work of almost 100 DuPont scientists over the years. One major effort was on DuPont Versipol post-metallocene catalysts for ethylene coordination polymerization and copolymerization.

Late in his career, his research interests became more diverse, yet he never left his central focus of transition metal chemistry. Biopanning produced polypeptides that would selectively bind minerals such as clays and calcium carbonate to cellulose, skin, hair, and other surfaces. His contributions to nanotechnology and the electronics and displays industries include printing carbon nanotubes for plasma displays, spin printing and inkjet printing of nanomaterials, and fluoro-resists for printing OLED displays. Ittel coauthored the definitive textbook, Homogeneous Catalysis, with George Parshall, and his work is recorded in over 150 citations in Chemical Abstracts. He has 60 US Patents, many more foreign patent applications and 90 publications of original research.

Ittel practices the art of bonsai, assists the curation of the bonsai collection at Longwood Gardens, and has displayed trees at Longwood Gardens and the Brandywine River Museum.

== Personal life ==
Ittel's father was a superintendent of a rural school district and a YMCA camp director, so he spent the first 19 summers of his life at Camp Campbell Gard outside Hamilton, Ohio. His mother was one of the 165 victims of the Beverly Hills Supper Club fire.

He is married to Kathleen P. Ittel, Esq. and they have two children.
