= Earl Muetterties =

American inorganic chemist

Earl Leonard Muetterties
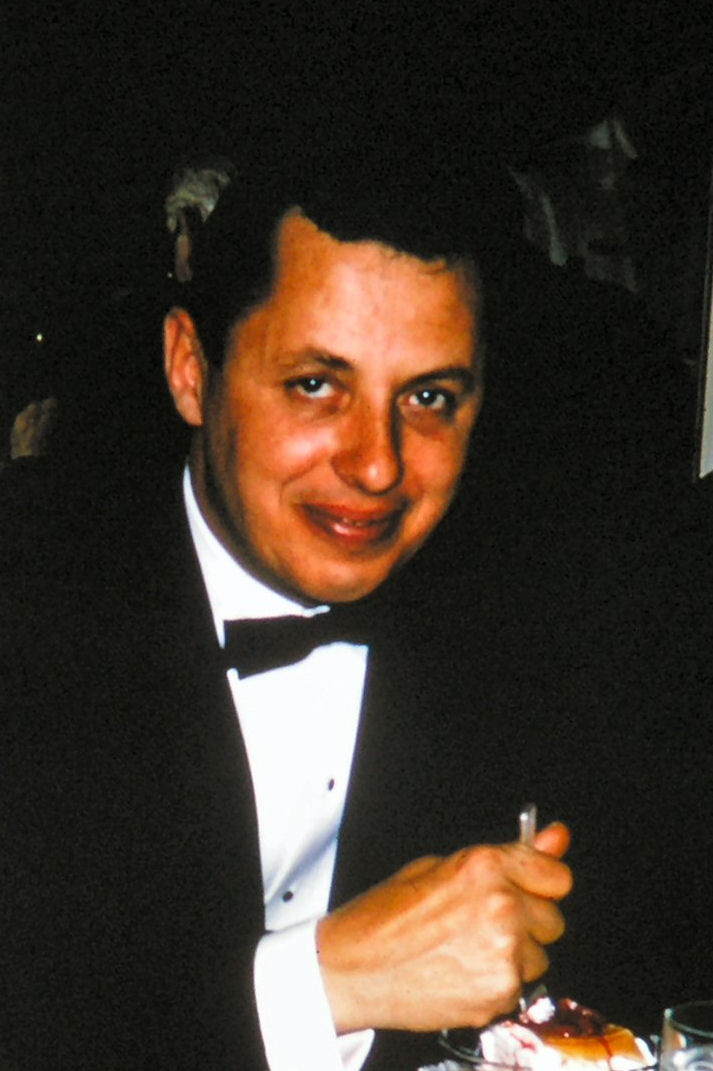
- Born: June 23, 1927; Elgin, Illinois
- Died: January 12, 1984 (aged 56); Oakland, California
- Education: Northwestern University, Harvard University
- Known for: Polyhedral boranes Fluxional processes in organometallic complexes Homogeneous catalysis Heterogeneous catalysis Apicophilicity
- Awards: Senior U.S.. Scientist Award of the Humboldt Foundation; ACS Award in Inorganic Chemistry (1965); Royal Society of Chemistry (RSC) Centenary Lectureship (1981); National Academy of Sciences
- Scientific career
- Fields: Inorganic chemistry
- Workplaces: DuPont Central Research, Cornell University, University of California, Berkeley
- Doctoral advisor: Charles Brown and Eugene G. Rochow
- Doctoral students: Cynthia Friend

Earl Muetterties (June 23, 1927 – January 12, 1984), was an American inorganic chemist born in Illinois, who is known for his experimental work with boranes, homogeneous catalysis, heterogeneous catalysis, fluxional processes in organometallic complexes and apicophilicity.

== Training ==
Muetterties earned a bachelor's degree in chemistry at Northwestern University in 1949 and received his doctoral thesis in boron-nitrogen chemistry under Charles Brown and Eugene G. Rochow at Harvard in 1952.

== Career ==
=== Career at DuPont ===
Earl Muetterties joined DuPont Central Research Department and was promoted to research supervisor in 1955. His early contributions were on the inorganic fluorine compounds, especially of sulfur and phosphorus. In collaboration with William D. Phillips he exploited NMR for study of dynamic processes in inorganic fluoride compounds. Muetterties's work on boron hydride clusters led to the work on several polyhedral borane anions such as B_{12}H_{12}^{2−}. He was an inventor on some basic findings with the polyhedral borate anions. In addition to the polyhedral boranes, the program explored pi-allyl, fluoroalkyl, and boron hydride complexes of the transition metals. Research also extended to stereochemically-non-rigid complexes. In 1965, Muetterties became Associate Director in the DuPont Central Research. In addition to groups in homogeneous and heterogeneous catalysis, groups were established in the synthesis and spectroscopy of organometallic compounds. He was also a prolific inventor.

=== Academic career ===
Muetterties's academic ties started with an adjunct professorship in chemistry at Princeton University (1967–1969) and then at the University of Pennsylvania (1969–1973). With the Monell Chemical Senses Center, his research interests extended to mammalian pheromones. After a two-month lectureship at Cambridge University in 1972, he assumed a professorship at Cornell University in 1973, conducting research on organometallic chemistry and homogeneous catalysis, sometimes in collaboration with Roald Hoffman. In 1979, Muetterties moved to the University of California, Berkeley, where he continued research in homogeneous catalysis and cluster chemistry. At Berkeley he also worked on surface science, and he maintained a research facility at the Lawrence Berkeley Laboratory.

Muetterties helped establish the American Chemical Society journals Inorganic Chemistry and Organometallics. He was on the editorial board of Inorganic Syntheses and edited Volume 10. He also edited books on boron chemistry and transition-metal hydrides and wrote reviews on complexes with unusual coordination numbers. A tribute to Muetterties has also been published.
