= Hydrocyanation =

Chemical process of converting alkenes to nitriles

In organic chemistry, hydrocyanation is a process for conversion of alkenes to nitriles. The reaction involves the addition of hydrogen cyanide and requires a catalyst if the substrate alkene is unactivated. This conversion is conducted on an industrial scale for the production of precursors to nylon. Direct hydrocyanation is rarely practice in the laboratory because hydrogen cyanide is extremely toxic, but transfer variants can allow other nitrilic compounds to serve as hydrogen cyanide synthons.

== Hydrocyanation of unactivated alkenes ==
Industrially, hydrocyanation is commonly performed on alkenes catalyzed by nickel complexes of phosphite (P(OR)_{3}) ligands. A general reaction is shown:

RCH=CH_{2} + HCN → RCH_{2}−CH_{2}−CN

=== Mechanism ===
The reaction proceeds via oxidative addition of HCN to a low-valent metal complex to give a hydrido cyanide complex. Subsequently the alkene binds to the complex. The intermediate M(H)(CN)L_{n}(alkene) then undergoes migratory insertion to give an alkylmetal cyanide. The cycle completes with reductive elimination of the nitrile, which is rate-limiting. Lewis acids, such as triphenylboron (B(C_{6}H_{5})_{3}), speed elimination, increasing the overall reaction rate.

Nickel-based catalysts deactivate when they formation of dicyanonickel(II) species, which are unreactive toward alkenes. The dicyanide arises via two pathways (L = phosphite):

Ni(H)(CN)L_{2} + HCN → Ni(CN)_{2}L_{2} + H_{2}
Ni(R)(CN)L_{2} + HCN → Ni(CN)_{2}L_{2} + RH

=== Asymmetrization ===
Most alkenes are prochiral, and their hydrocyanation generates chiral nitriles. Conventional hydrocyanation catalysts, e.g. Ni(P(OR)_{3})_{4}, catalyse the formation of racemic mixtures. When however the supporting ligands are chiral, the hydrocyanation can be highly enantioselective. For asymmetric hydrocyanation, popular chiral ligands are chelating aryl diphosphite complexes.

=== History ===
Hydrocyanation was first reported by Arthur and Pratt in 1954, when they homogeneously catalyzed the hydrocyanation of linear alkenes. The industrial process for catalytic hydrocyanation of butadiene to adiponitrile was invented by William C. Drinkard.

== With activated alkenes ==
Carbonyls are well-known to add cyanide, in the cyanohydrin reaction; and several variants on the Michael reaction are formal hydrocyanations. Simple conjugate addition leads to β-cyanoketones; direct addition to form a cyanohydrin sometimes induces a second addition to form β-cyano-cyanohydrins. Reaction conditions allows access to any of these products.

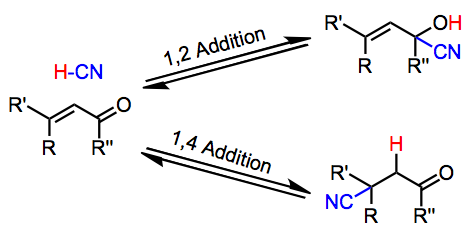

Generally acidic conditions favor 1,2-adducts, while basic conditions favor 1,4-adducts. Additions of alkali metal cyanides, for instance, lead exclusively to 1,4-addition. In contrast to alkali metal cyanides and cyanoaluminates, Lewis acidic cyanides, such as TMSCN, favor 1,2-addition. Acetylenic substrates undergo the reaction; however the scope of this reaction is limited and yields are often low.

1,4-Addition to imines has been observed in a few cases, although imines are often base labile.

Esters, nitriles, and other carbonyl derivatives also undergo conjugative hydrocyanation. When alkali metal cyanides are used, at least partial neutralization of the reaction medium is usually necessary. Neutralization can be accomplished through an acidic group on the substrate itself (internal neutralization). or through the addition of an external acid (external neutralization). Acetic acid is commonly used for this purpose, in a procedure originally described by Lapworth.

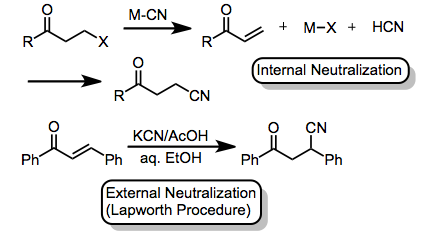

Conjugative hydrocyanation was used to prepare the steroidal D ring. Diastereoselectivity is generally high in these addition reactions, and the resulting β-cyano carbonyl compounds can be converted to a number of steroidal products.

== Applications ==
The most important industrial application is the nickel-catalyzed synthesis of adiponitrile (NC−(CH_{2})_{4}−CN) synthesis from buta-1,3-diene (CH_{2}=CH−CH=CH_{2}). Adiponitrile is a precursor to hexamethylenediamine (H_{2}N−(CH_{2})_{6}−NH_{2}), which is used for the production of certain kinds of Nylon. The DuPont ADN process to give adiponitrile is shown below:

This process consists of three steps: hydrocyanation of butadiene to a mixture of 2-methyl-butene-3-nitrile (2M3BM) and pentene-3-nitrile (3PN), an isomerization step from 2M3BM (not desired) to 3PN and a second hydrocyanation (aided by a Lewis acid cocatalyst such as aluminium trichloride or triphenylboron) to adiponitrile.

Naproxen, an anti-inflammatory drug, is prepared via an asymmetric hydrocyanation of a vinylnaphthalene utilizing a phosphinite (OPR_{2}) ligand, L . The enantioselectivity of this reaction is important because only the S enantiomer is medicinally desirable, whereas the R enantiomer produces harmful health effects. This reaction can produce the S enantiomer with >90% stereoselectivity. Upon recrystallization of the crude product, the optically pure nitrile can be obtained.

== Transfer reactions ==
In transhydrocyanation, an equivalent of HCN is transferred from a cyanohydrin, e.g. acetone cyanohydrin, to another activated HCN acceptor. The transfer is an equilibrium process, initiated by base. The reaction can be driven by trapping or a superior acceptor, such as an aldehyde.

Some hydrocyanation catalysts generate a reversible equilibrium, and can transfer HCN units between two different alkenes.
