= Vy Maria Dong =

American chemist

Vy Dong
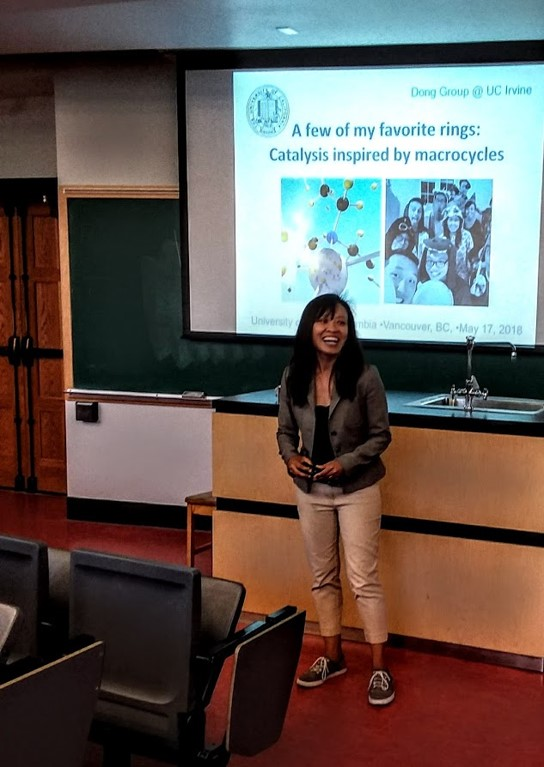
- Born: Vy Maria Dong; 1976 (age 49–50); Big Spring, Texas
- Education: University of California, Irvine B.S. (1998); California Institute of Technology Ph.D. (2003)
- Scientific career
- Fields: Organic chemistry
- Institutions: University of California, Irvine (2012-present); University of Toronto (2006-2012); University of California, Berkeley (2004-2006)
- Thesis: Novel Variants of the Zwitterionic Claisen Rearrangement and the Total Synthesis of Erythronolide B (2003)
- Doctoral advisor: David MacMillan
- Other academic advisors: Larry E. Overman, Robert G. Bergman, Ken Raymond
- Website: www.chem.uci.edu/~dongv

Vy Maria Dong (born 1976 in Big Spring, Texas) is a Vietnamese-American Chancellor's Professor of Chemistry at the University of California, Irvine (UCI). Dong works on enantioselective catalysis and natural product synthesis. She received the Royal Society of Chemistry's Merck, Sharp & Dohme Award in 2020, the American Chemical Society's Elias James Corey Award in 2019, and the UCI's Distinguished Alumni Award in 2018.

== Early life and education ==
Dong was born in Big Spring, Texas, in 1976, where she spent her early childhood, and moved with her family to Anaheim, California. The first in her family to attend college, she studied chemistry at the University of California, Irvine (UCI) as a Regents' Scholar. Dong decided to study chemistry during her sophomore year after taking a class with Larry E. Overman, whom she later conducted undergraduate research with. She graduated magna cum laude in 1998 from UCI.

For her graduate studies, Dong attended the University of California, Berkeley, joining David MacMillan's lab as one of his first graduate students. She moved with MacMillan to the California Institute of Technology, earning her PhD there in 2004. Her thesis featured work on variants of a zwitterionic-Claisen rearrangement, and their application towards a total synthesis of the natural product erythronolide B.

Dong then moved back to UC Berkeley, working on supramolecular chemistry with Robert G. Bergman and Ken Raymond as a NIH Postdoctoral Fellow. Her work with Bergman and Raymond focused on the development of a supramolecular host molecule that can stabilize reactive iminium ions in water.

== Research and career ==
Dong began her independent career in 2006 at the University of Toronto. At Toronto, she worked on heterocycles for medicinal chemistry. She demonstrated how lactones could be synthesized from keto-aldehydes using rhodium catalysts, achieving regio- and enantioselective lactones without any waste products. Dong was appointed the Adrain Brook Distinguished Professor at the University of Toronto in 2011.

In 2013, Dong moved her research group to the University of California, Irvine (UCI). Early highlights of research at UCI include catalytic hydroacylation and the activation of aldehyde C-H bonds. Dong demonstrated that rhodium catalysis could be used to make cyclic peptides, using entirely achiral building blocks and hydrogenation catalysts. Rh-hydride catalysis permits enantioselective reduction and allows access to motifs popular in medicinal chemistry. Dong has also reported an aldehyde-alkyne coupling strategy using a dual rhodium catalyst and amine organocatalyst system. Dong continues to explore new reagents, catalysts and strategies for organic synthesis.

== Awards and honors ==
Dong is the recipient of numerous awards for her research in organic chemistry. She was awarded an Ontario Research Fund grant in 2008. Dong delivered the inaugural Eli Lilly Young lecture at the University of Wisconsin–Madison in 2009, where she discussed the catalytic transformations of C-H bonds. She was awarded an Alfred P. Sloan Foundation Fellowship in 2009 and a named an Amgen Young Investigator in 2010. In 2010 she was awarded the AstraZeneca Award in Chemistry. She won an Arthur C. Cope Scholar Award of the American Chemical Society in 2010 for her contributions to organic chemistry. In 2011, Dong won the Roche Excellence in Chemistry award. Dong won a Novartis Chemistry Lecturer in 2012. She was awarded a Society of Synthetic Organic Chemistry in Japan (SSOJC) Lectureship, and a Japan Society for the Promotion of Science Fellowship in 2013. In 2016, Dong was awarded the Iota Sigma Pi Agnes Fay Morgan Research Award for her exceptional research on catalytic hydroacylation. Dong received the UCI's Distinguished Alumni Award in 2018, the American Chemical Society's Elias James Corey Award in 2019, and the Royal Society of Chemistry's Merck, Sharp & Dohme Award in 2020.

Dong has served as an associate editor of the Royal Society of Chemistry journal Chemical Science since 2015.

== Personal life ==
Dong met her future husband, Wilmer Alkhas, at the University of California, Irvine. They have a son, Liam.
