= Hay Guide Chart =

Job role evaluation system

Hay Job Evaluation is a method used by corporations and organizations to map out their job roles in the context of the organizational structure.

== Criticisms ==
A criticism levelled against the Hay Guide Chart is that the choice of factors is skewed towards traditional management values:

"The Hay system consistently values male-dominated management functions over non-management functions more likely to be performed by women.”

The Hay system does not account for the availability of alternative resources in the market. A carpenter may be classified as a low scale occupation, but if there are none available the method will not account for that.

In the EU, using a job evaluation scheme can provide a material factor defence for equal pay claims, but care must be taken to ensure that the scheme itself cannot be said to have a gender bias.
