= Nanolamination =

Nanolamination is the production of materials that are fully dense, ultra-fine grained solids that exhibit a high concentration of interface defects. The properties of fabricated nanolaminates depend on their compositions and thicknesses.

== Production ==
Nanolaminates can be grown using atom-by-atom deposition techniques that are designed with different stacking sequences and layer thicknesses.

=== Electrolytic reduction ===
Electrolytic reduction allows the production of metals and metal alloys in sub-μm-thick layers. It can be employed to create alloys with properties such as improved toughness, strength, thermal properties and corrosion that are a function of the interfaces in the nanolayers. They can be created using a bath containing multiple metal ion elements. By changing the current at precise moments to select a different element, it can create a layered structure. Coatings of up to a centimeter thick have been created.

It is claimed to offer the benefits of high-cost materials at much lower costs, because such materials can coat lower-cost materials that have other necessary properties such as strength.

Commercial production was introduced in the 2010s by a new company named Modumetal.

=== Atomic layer deposition ===
Many hybrid thin film oxides can be created using atomic layer deposition (ALD) with unique physical, chemical, and electronic properties. For example, a rough oxide layer can be further coated with a smooth oxide layer to provide a required surface texture. Properties may also depend on deposition temperature and the stratum to which the nanolaminate is applied.

=== Performance ===
In autoclave testing, some nanolaminated alloys have shown 8 times the resistance of carbon steels to degradation and in some cases, no measurable degradation.

== Applications ==
Application include those that take advantage of enhanced mechanical properties or for devices such as energy storage and memory storage capacitors.

=== Oil and gas ===
Corrosion-resistant, structural tubulars and casings are important infrastructure assets in the oil and gas industry. Tubulars and casings are subject to aggressive well conditions, serving to permit operations across extreme formation and production pressure differentials, in high temperatures and in highly corrosive environments that contain hydrogen sulfide (H_{2}S), carbon dioxide (CO_{2}) and chlorides.

Modumetal produces pumps, valves and tubulars that for launch customers. The products are claimed to offer corrosion and wear protection through a durable, high toughness, nanolaminated metal alloy cladding.

=== Electronics ===
Nanolaminate dielectrics can have efficient dielectric constant and high insulation characteristics. Dielectric materials with giant dielectric constants can be fabricated as modified single, binary and perovskite oxides.

== See also ==
- Electroplating
