= Agnes Fay Morgan Research Award =

Award for women in chemistry

The Agnes Fay Morgan Research Award was established in 1951 by the Iota Sigma Pi honorary society for women in chemistry. The award is given for research achievement in chemistry or biochemistry to a woman not over forty years of age at the time of her nomination. Individual chapters, Iota Sigma Pi members, chemists, and groups of chemists may nominate eligible chemists for the prize.

The award was named for Agnes Fay Morgan (1884–1968), biochemist and nutritionist, born in Peoria, Illinois, USA. She studied at the University of Chicago (BS, MS, PhD), and taught at the University of California, Berkeley (1915–54), where she helped organize (1919) what was to become a nationally outstanding home economics department. A founder of the science of nutrition, her research focused on the analysis of nutrients in foods, the stability of vitamins and proteins during food processing, and the physiological effects of vitamin deficiencies. Especially noteworthy was her discovery of the role of pantothenic acid in adrenal function and pigmentation. Her work for government and private agencies included the development of improved methods of dehydrating foods.

== Award recipients ==
Source: Iota Sigma Pi

- 1951 Charlotte Roderuck
- 1952 Mary Louise Quaife
- 1954 Donna B. Coslich
- 1957 Marjorie M. Nelson
- 1960 Evelyn L. Oginsky
- 1963 Maxine F. Singer
- 1966 H. Sue Hanlon
- 1969 Mary L. Good
- 1972 Janet Del Bene
- 1975 Giovanna Ferro-Luzzi Ames
- 1978 Joyce Benjamins
- 1981 Marcetta York Darensbourg
- 1984 Marye Anne Fox
- 1987 Marion Thurnauer
- 1990 Victoria L. McGuffin
- 1991 Cynthia Friend
- 1992 Jacqueline K. Barton
- 1993 Geraldine L. Richmond
- 1994 Jeanne Pemberton
- 1995 Jennifer S. Brodbelt
- 1996 Robin L. Garrell
- 1997 Susan M. Lunte
- 1998 Anne B. Myers
- 1999 Nancy Makri
- 2000 Kim Baldridge
- 2001 Jean Chmielewski
- 2002 Alanna Schepartz
- 2003 Tamar Schlick
- 2004 Carolyn Bertozzi
- 2005 Sharon Hammes-Schiffer
- 2006 Mei Hong
- 2007 Anna Krylov
- 2008 Julia Chan
- 2009 Helen Blackwell
- 2010 Kyoung-Shin Choi
- 2011 Lauren Webb
- 2012 Michelle Chang
- 2013 Malika Jeffries-El
- 2014 Amy Prieto
- 2015 Jin Kim Montclare
- 2016 Vy Dong
- 2019 Leslie M. Hicks
- 2020 Jillian Lee Dempsey
- 2021 Geraldine Richmond
- 2022 Ellen Sletten
- 2023 Prineha Narang

== See also ==
- List of chemistry awards
- List of science and technology awards for women
