= Jin Kim Montclare =

Korean American biomolecular engineer

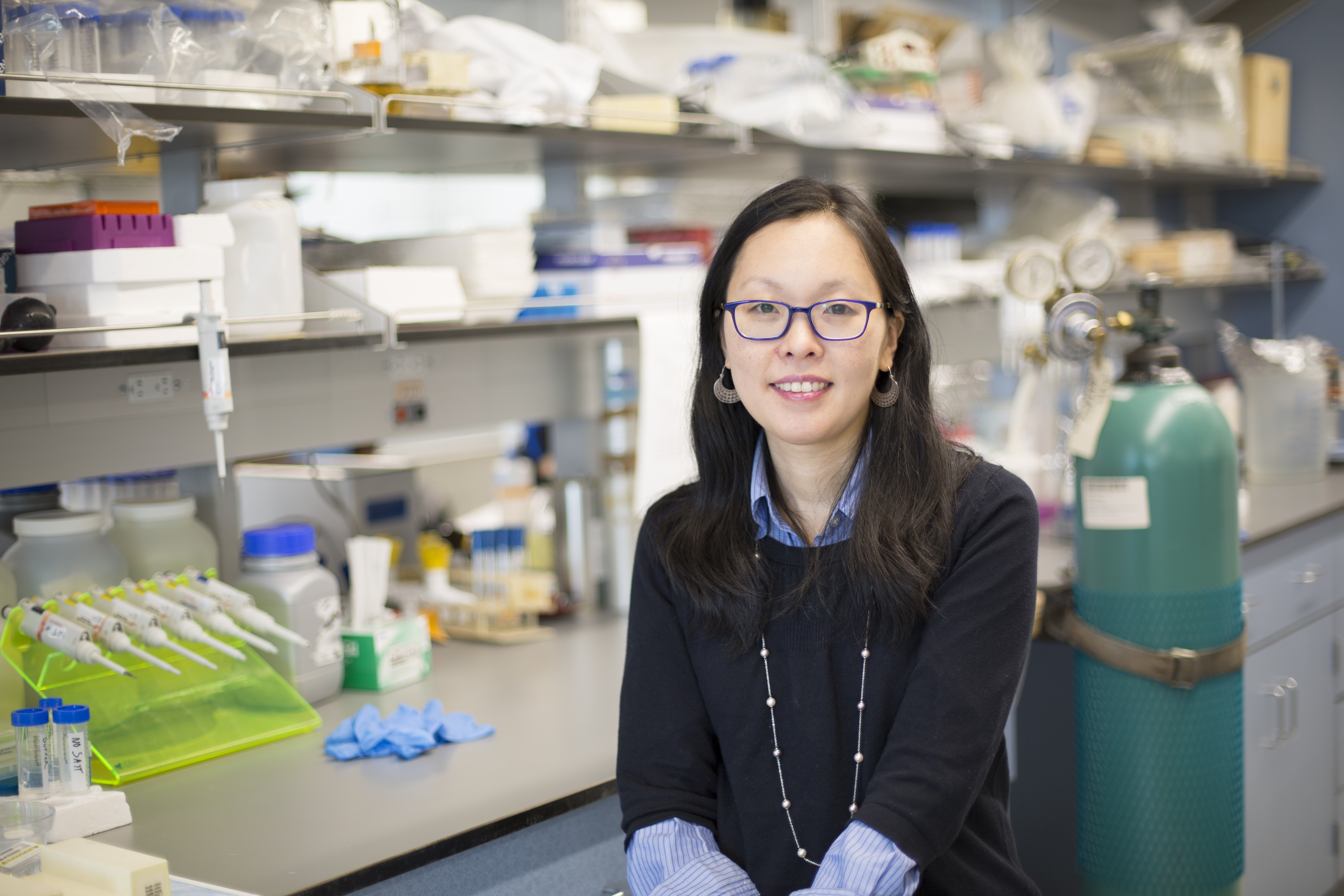
- Jin Kim Montclare in 2017
- Education: Fordham University; Yale University
- Known for: Biomolecular engineering
- Awards: AAAS Leshner Fellow (2019); Agnes Fay Morgan Research Award (2015)
- Scientific career
- Workplaces: California Institute of Technology; New York University
- Thesis: Specific recognition of DNA by natural transcription factors and miniature protein mimics (2002)

Jin Kim Montclare is a Professor of Chemical and Biomolecular Engineering at New York University. She creates novel proteins that can be used in drug delivery, tissue regeneration, and medical treatment. She is a 2019 AAAS Leshner Leadership Fellow and has been inducted into the AIMBE College of Fellows.

== Early life and education ==
Montclare was born in The Bronx. She is a first-generation Korean American. She became interested in chemistry in high school. She studied at Fordham University, where she majored in chemistry and minored in philosophy. She earned her bachelor's degree in 1997. She was awarded the Merck Index Award for excellence in organic chemistry and the Clare Boothe Luce Scholarship for women in science. Montclare was elected a member of Iota Sigma Pi. She moved to Yale University for her graduate degree, earning a master's in 2001 and a PhD in 2003. She worked in the lab of Alanna Schepartz, completing a thesis on the recognition of DNA by natural transcription factors. Her graduate research was supported by the National Science Foundation and Pfizer. She attributes her passion for chemistry to her mentors, including her grandmother.

== Research and career ==
Montclare joined California Institute of Technology as an National Institutes of Health postdoctoral fellow, where she began to work on engineering new molecules with David A. Tirrell. She joined New York University in 2005, where she leads the Protein Engineering and Molecular Design Lab.

Montclare has worked with the United States Department of Defense to detoxify organophosphates, which are commonly used in pesticides and as warfare agents. She develops stable, activate fluorinated phosphotriesterase (PTE) variants by combining PTE with non-canonical amino acids. She has also developed protein-engineered hydrogels that could be used as biomimetic materials. Instead of synthetically creating polymers, Montclare uses biologically engineered proteins that can be easily controlled by external stimuli. Montclare's protein-based hydrogels can be used to direct neuronal growth for brain augmentation. The hydrogels could be used to heal wounds, sense or control the flow of fluids or deliver medicine. They are made from Escherichia coli bacterium which are patterned onto substrates, similar to how geckos can adhere to surfaces. The She has developed a range of other nanomaterials derived from proteins, including coiled-coil fibres and helix-elastin block polymers.

Other research in the Montclare group includes the design of protein-lipid macromolecular systems that can be used to transport nanoparticles, drugs, and genes to treat a variety of medical conditions. The lipoprotoeplexes can be used to deliver drugs and genes across many types of cells in a GeneTrain. They can form complexes with nucleic acid and small hydrophobic drugs. The lipid container permits transfection past a cell membrane, whilst the protein capsule can bind chemotherapeutic molecules.

=== Public engagement and advocacy ===
Montclare has been involved with outreach programs to introduce people in K-12 Education to science studies at the NYU Tandon School of Engineering. She hosts a group of high school students for research opportunities every summer as well as leading outreach programs in Brooklyn high schools. Montclare is part of the National Science Foundation Innovation Corps (I-Corps) program, and since 2013 has directed the New York University Tandon I-Corps site, the Convergence of Innovation and Entrepreneurship (CIE) Institute. At the CIE Montclare seeks to increase the representation of women and underrepresented minority entrepreneurs, with the hope to increase their participation in STEM careers. Whilst only 20% of engineering students in the United States are women, at New York University women make up between 40 and 45%. She has written for The Huffington Post about the need for parents and adults to be more proactive in engaging their children with science. Montclare co-founded inSchoolApps, who make web-based applications for science-based applications. Montclare was featured in the Marvel Comics Unstoppable Wasp.

=== Awards and honours ===
- 2006 Othmer Institute Othmer Junior Fellow
- 2006 Wechsler Award for Excellence
- 2007 Air Force Research Laboratory Young Investigator Award
- 2010 New York University Jacobs Excellence in Education Award
- 2014 Distinguished Award for Excellence, Dedication to Invention, Innovation and Entrepreneurship
- 2014 Executive Leadership in Academic Technology and Engineering Fellowship
- 2015 Agnes Fay Morgan Research Award
- 2016 American Chemical Society Rising Star Award
- 2019 AAAS Leshner Leadership Fellow
- 2019 AIMBE College of Fellows

=== Patents ===
- 2008 Polymer carrier
- 2016 Protein engineered systems for delivery of molecules
- 2016 Fluorinated protein-based polymeric carriers
- 2017 Protein nanofibers from self-assembling pentamers
- 2017 Engineered fluorinated biomaterials
- 2017 Protein polymer gold nanoparticle hybrid materials for small molecule delivery
- 2017 Phosphotriesterase enzymes, methods and compositions related thereto
