= CUNY Graduate Center =

Public research institution and postgraduate university

Graduate School and University Center of the City University of New York
- Motto: We Believe That Knowledge Is a Public Good
- Type: Public post-graduate university
- Established: 1961
- Academic affiliations: City University of New York
- Budget: >$114 million (2025)
- President: Joshua Brumberg
- Provost: Joel Christensen
- Academic staff: 1,840 (2015)
- Students: 3,100+
- Doctoral students: 2,621 (2024)
- Location: New York City, New York, United States; 40°44′55″N 73°59′01″W
- Campus: Urban, 570,000 sq ft (53,000 m^{2})
- Newspaper: The Advocate
- Colors: Blue and white
- Website: www.gc.cuny.edu

The Graduate School and University Center of the City University of New York (CUNY Graduate Center) is a public research institution and postgraduate university in New York City. Formed in 1961 as Division of Graduate Studies at City University of New York, it was renamed to Graduate School and University Center in 1969. Serving as the principal doctorate-granting institution of the City University of New York (CUNY) system, CUNY Graduate Center is classified as "R1: Doctoral University–Very High Spending and Doctorate Production".

CUNY Graduate Center is located at the B. Altman and Company Building at 365 Fifth Avenue in Midtown Manhattan. It offers 32 doctoral programs, 18 master's programs, and operates over 30 research centers and institutes. The Graduate Center employs a core faculty of approximately 130 professors, in addition to over 1,700 faculty members appointed from other CUNY colleges throughout New York City. As of fall 2025, the Graduate Center enrolls over 3,100 students, of which 2,600 are doctoral students. For the fall 2025 semester, the average acceptance rate across all doctoral programs at the CUNY Graduate Center was 13.5%.

The Graduate Center's primary library, named after the American mathematician Mina Rees, is part of the CUNY library network of 31 colleges that collectively holds over 6.2 million volumes. Since 1968, the CUNY Graduate Center has maintained an agreement with the New York Public Library, which gives faculty and students increased borrowing privileges at NYPL's research collections at the Stephen A. Schwarzman Building. The Graduate Center building also houses the James Gallery, which is an independent exhibition space open to the public, and television studios for NYC Media and CUNY TV.

The faculty of the CUNY Graduate Center include recipients of the Nobel Prize, the Abel Prize, Pulitzer Prize, the National Humanities Medal, the National Medal of Science, the National Endowment for the Humanities, the Rockefeller Fellowship, the Schock Prize, the Bancroft Prize, the Wolf Prize, Grammy Awards, the George Jean Nathan Award for Dramatic Criticism, Guggenheim Fellowships, the New York City Mayor's Award for Excellence in Science and Technology, the Presidential Early Career Awards for Scientists and Engineers, Presidential Award for Excellence in Science, Mathematics and Engineering Mentoring, and memberships in the American Academy of Arts and Sciences, the National Academy of Sciences, and the National Academy of Education.

== History ==
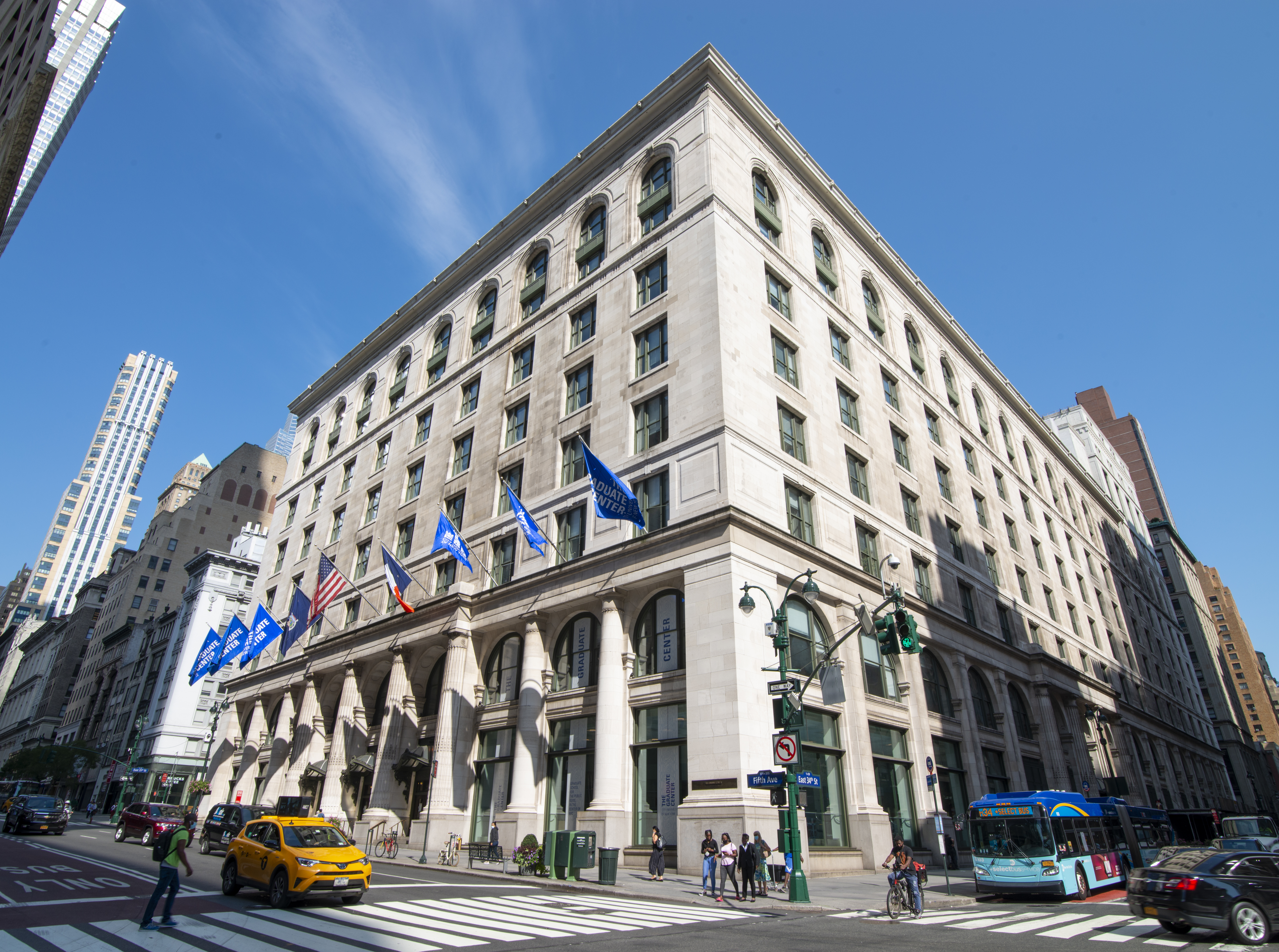
The Graduate Center is located in the former B. Altman and Company Building at 365 Fifth Avenue.

CUNY began offering doctoral education through its Division of Graduate Studies in 1961, and awarded its first two PhD to Daniel Robinson and Barbara Stern in 1965. Robinson, formerly a professor of philosophy at the University of Oxford, received his Ph.D. in psychology, while Stern, late of Rutgers University, received her Ph.D. in English literature.

In 1969, the Division of Graduate Studies formally became the Graduate School and University Center. Mathematician Mina S. Rees served as the institution's first president from 1969 until her retirement in 1972. Rees was succeeded as president of the Graduate Center by environmental psychologist Harold M. Proshansky, who served until his death in 1990. Provost Steven M. Cahn was named acting president in Spring 1991. Psychologist Frances Degen Horowitz was appointed president in September 1991. In 2005, Horowitz was succeeded by the school's provost, Professor of English Literature William P. Kelly.

During Kelly's tenure at the Graduate Center, the university saw significant growth in revenue, funding opportunities for students, increased Distinguished Faculty, and a general resurgence. This is in accordance with three primary goals articulated in the Graduate Center's strategic plan. The first of these involves enhancing student support. In 2013, 83 dissertation-year fellowships were awarded at a total cost of $1.65 million. The Graduate Center is also developing new programs to advance research prior to the dissertation phase, including archival work. The fiscal stability of the university has enabled the chancellery to increase, on an incremental basis, the value of these fellowships. The packages extended for the 2013–14 years increase stipends and reduce teaching requirements. In 2001, the Graduate Center provided 14 million dollars in student support, and, in Fall 2013, 51 million in student support.

On April 23, 2013, the CUNY Board of Trustees announced that President Kelly would serve as interim chancellor for the City University of New York beginning July 1 with the retirement of Chancellor Matthew Goldstein. GC Provost Chase F. Robinson, a historian, was appointed to serve as interim president of the Graduate Center in 2013, and then served as president from July 2014 to December 2018.

Joy Connolly became provost in August 2016 and interim president in December 2018. Julia Wrigley was appointed as interim provost in December 2018. In July 2019, James Muyskens became interim president, as Connolly had been appointed president of the American Council of Learned Societies. On March 30, 2020, Robin L. Garrell, vice provost for graduate education and dean of graduate division at University of California, Los Angeles, was announced as the next president of the Graduate Center. She assumed office on August 1, 2020 and served until September 28, 2023.

Steve Everett assumed the position of provost and senior vice president in August 2021. Norman Carey succeeded him as interim provost in August 2024. In August 2025, Joel P. Christensen was appointed as the new provost.

Joshua Brumberg assumed the position of interim president on October 2, 2023. He was appointed president of the CUNY Graduate Center in June 2024.

== Campus ==
The CUNY Graduate Center's main campus is located in the B. Altman and Company Building at 34th Street and Fifth Avenue in the Midtown Manhattan neighborhood of New York City. CUNY shares the B. Altman Building with the Oxford University Press. Before 2000, the Graduate Center was housed in Aeolian Hall on West 42nd Street across from the New York Public Library Main Branch. In 2017, the CUNY Advanced Science Research Center at 85 St. Nicholas Terrace in Manhattan's Harlem neighborhood became part of the CUNY Graduate Center.

=== Advanced Science Research Center ===
The Advanced Science Research Center at the Graduate Center (CUNY ASRC) is an interdisciplinary STEM center for research and education. It covers five related fields: nanoscience, photonics, structural biology, neuroscience, and environmental science. The CUNY ASRC is located in a 200,000-square-foot (19,000 m^{2}) building on the southern edge of City College's campus in Upper Manhattan. The CUNY ASRC, which opened in September 2014, is an outgrowth of CUNY's "Decade of Science" initiative, a multibillion-dollar project to elevating science research and education.

The CUNY ASRC formally joined the CUNY Graduate Center in spring 2017. Today, the CUNY ASRC is one of the major pieces of CUNY's citywide research network. Five years after the center opened, over 200 graduate, undergraduate, and high school students had been mentored by CUNY ASRC scientists. In that time, the center also hosted over 400 conferences, seminars, and workshops and awarded over $600,000 in seed grants to CUNY faculty.

==== Research initiatives ====
The CUNY ASRC was founded on the principle that researchers across different disciplines would collaborate to make scientific advancements. Thus, it consists of five related fields:

- Nanoscience: Exploring on the tiniest scale, using the living world for inspiration to create new materials and devices that advance fields ranging from biomedicine to energy production
- Photonics: Discovering new ways to control light, heat, radio waves, and sound for future optical computers, ultrasensitive cameras, and cell phone technology
- Structural biology: Combining physics and chemistry to explore biology at the molecular and cellular levels, with the intention of identifying new ways to treat diseases
- Neuroscience: Investigating how the brain senses and responds to environmental and social experiences, with a focus on neural networks, metabolic changes, and molecular signals occurring in brain cells, with the goal of developing biosensors and innovative solutions to promote mental health
- Environmental sciences: Developing high-tech, interdisciplinary solutions to urgent environmental challenges, including air and water issues, climate change, and disease transmission

Each research initiative occupies one floor of the CUNY ASRC building that hosts four faculty laboratories and between two and four core facilities.

==== Core facilities ====
The CUNY ASRC has 15 core facilities with a variety of equipment. These facilities are open to researchers from CUNY, other academic institutions, nonprofit organizations, and for-profit companies from around the world.

The facilities include:

- Advanced Laboratory for Chemical and Isotopic Signatures (ALCIS) Facility
- Biomolecular Nuclear Magnetic Resonance (NMR) Facility
- Comparative Medicine Unit (CMU)
- Epigenetics Facilities
- Imaging Facility
- Live Imaging & Bioenergetics Facility
- MALDI Imaging Joint Facility
- Magnetic Resonance Imaging (MRI) Facility
- Macromolecular Crystallization Facility
- Mass Spectrometry Core Facility
- Nanofabrication Facility
- Next Generation Environmental Sensor (NGENS) Lab
- Photonics Core Facility
- Radio Frequency and mm-Wave Facility
- Surface Science Facility

==== Education and outreach ====
The CUNY ASRC has various scientific education programs. Students from CUNY's community and senior colleges participate in research during the academic year and over the summer through programs such as the CUNY Summer Undergraduate Research Program. Graduate students from master's and doctoral programs at the Graduate Center and from the Grove School of Engineering are members of CUNY ASRC research teams.

===== IlluminationSpace =====
The CUNY ASRC's IlluminationSpace is an interactive education center, which accommodates high school field trips and provides free community hours. It has numerous virtual programs and resources.

The CUNY ASRC received a Public Interest Technology University Network 2021 Challenge Grant to establish the IlluminationSpace, STEM pathways, and science communications and outreach at CUNY. The funding is being used to increase participation of underrepresented demographic groups in STEM fields.

===== Community Sensor Lab =====
The CUNY ASRC Community Sensor Lab teaches high school students and community members how to build inexpensive, homemade sensors that can monitor aspects of the environment from the level of carbon dioxide and pollutants in the air to acidity in the soil and water.

==== Faculty opportunities ====
The CUNY ASRC offers a seed grant program to fund collaborative research that supports tenured and tenure-track faculty at CUNY colleges. The program started in 2015 and currently awards six one-year, $20,000 grants annually.

In addition, the center's National Science Foundation CAREER Bootcamp Program, which guides tenure-track faculty through the proposal writing process, have helped CUNY researchers secure substantial NSF CAREER grants.

===== Grants and research =====
Between 2014 and 2019, CUNY ASRC researchers secured 126 grants totaling $61 million. Several recent grants have set records for CUNY and the CUNY Graduate Center. Faculty, postdoctoral fellows, and graduate students at the CUNY ASRC also hold several patents. Professor Kevin Gardner, director of the CUNY ASRC Structural Biology Initiative, was instrumental in the identification of hypoxia-inducible factor 2-alpha (HIF-2α) as a druggable target and the drug development efforts that led to the FDA-approved first-in-kind kidney cancer drug from Merck, belzutifan.

The CUNY ASRC is home to one of 15 Centers for Advanced Technology (CATs) designated by Empire State Development NYSTAR. Funded by a nearly $8.8 million grant, the CUNY ASRC Sensor CAT spurs academic-industry partnerships to develop sensor-based technology. Developing biomedical and environmental sensors is a particular focus, as is finding new approaches to sensing through photonics, materials, and nanoscience research.

Supported by a 2020 grant of up to $16 million from the Simons Foundation, a team of scientists led by Professor Andrea Alù, director of the CUNY ASRC Photonics Initiative, is studying wave transport in metamaterials. The team's work could lead to greater sensing capabilities for the Internet of Things, improvements in biomedical applications, and extreme control of sound waves for medical imaging and wireless technology.

Professors Rein Ulijn and Andrea Al], the directors of the CUNY ASRC Nanoscience Initiative and the CUNY ASRC Photonics Initiative, each won a prestigious Vannevar Bush Faculty Fellowship from the U.S. Department of Defense, the agency's highest-ranking single-investigator award. Alù's $3 million fellowship, awarded in 2019, allowed him to develop new materials that enable extreme wave manipulation in the context of thermal radiation and heat management. Alù was also named the 2021 Blavatnik National Awards Laureate in Physical Sciences and Engineering. Ulijn's $3 million fellowship, awarded in 2021, allowed him to research how complex mixtures of molecules acquire functionality and to repurpose this understanding to create new nanotechnology that is inspired by living systems.

=== Mina Rees Library ===
The Mina Rees Library, named after former president Mina Rees, supports the research, teaching, and learning activities of the CUNY Graduate Center by connecting its community with print materials, electronic resources, research assistance and instruction, and expertise about the complexities of scholarly communication. Situated on three floors of the CUNY Graduate Center, the library is a hub for discovery, delivery, digitization, and a place for solitary study. The library offers many services, including research consultations, a 24/7 online chat service with reference librarians, and workshops and webinars on using research tools.

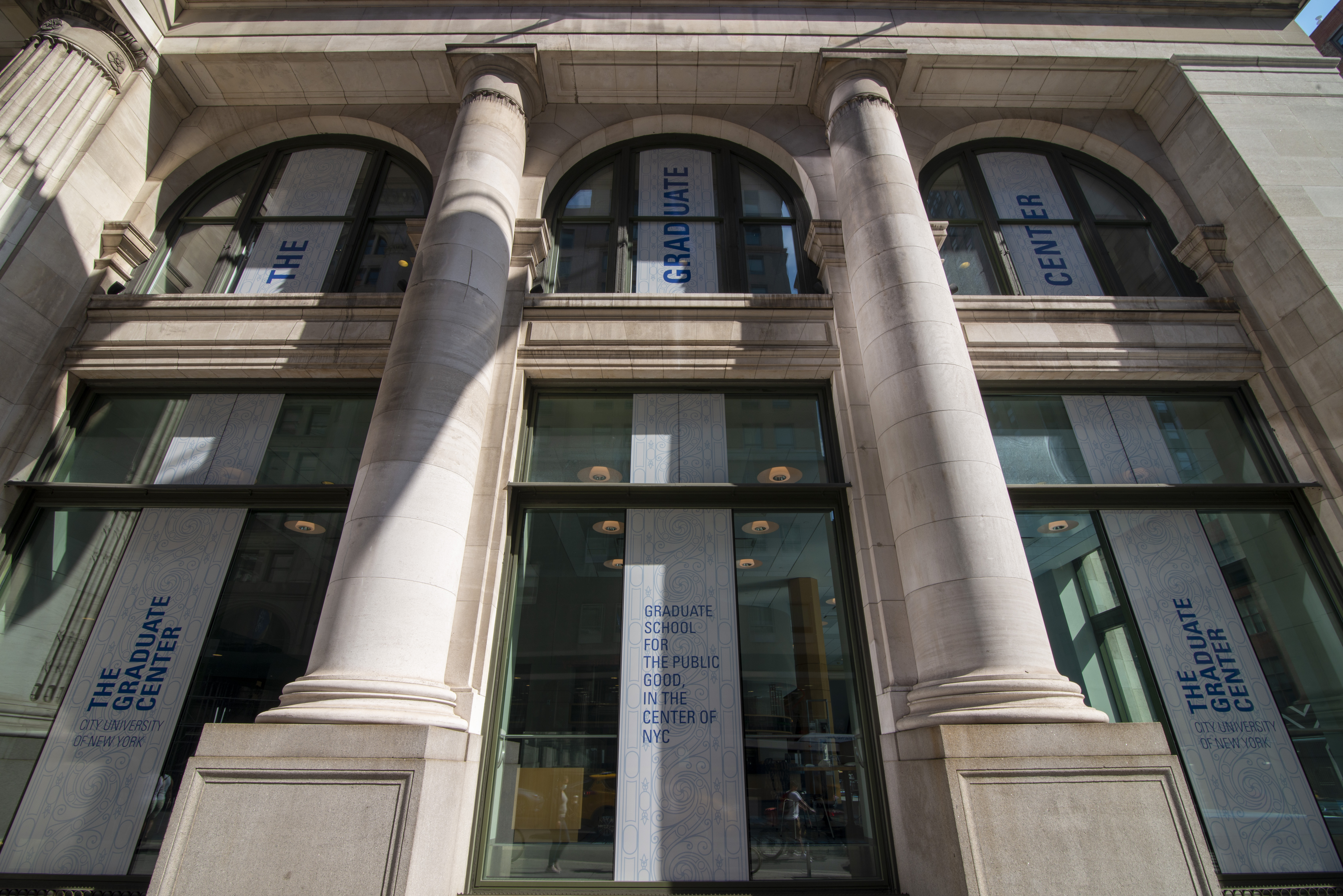
The windows of the Mina Rees Library near the corner of 5th Avenue and 34th Street

The library also serves as a gateway to the collections of other CUNY libraries, the New York Public Library (NYPL), and libraries worldwide. It participates in a CUNY-wide book delivery system and offers an interlibrary loan service to bring materials from outside CUNY to Graduate Center scholars. The main branch of NYPL is just a few blocks north on Fifth Avenue, and NYPL's Science, Industry and Business Library is just around the corner inside the B. Altman Building. CUNY Graduate Center students and faculty are NYPL's primary academic constituents, with borrowing privileges from NYPL research collections. NYPL's participation in the Manhattan Research Library Initiative (MaRLI) extends borrowing privileges for CUNY Graduate Center students to NYU and Columbia libraries as well.

The Mina Rees Library is a key participant in the CUNY Graduate Center's digital initiatives. It supports the digital scholarship of students and faculty and promotes the understanding, creation, and use of open-access literature. Among its special collections is the Activist Women's Voices collection, an oral history project focused on unheralded New York City community-based women activists.

=== Cultural venues ===
The CUNY Graduate Center houses three performance spaces and two art galleries. The Harold M. Proshansky Auditorium, named for the institution's second president, is located on the concourse level and contains 389 seats. The Baisley Powell Elebash Recital Hall, located on the first floor, seats 180. The Martin E. Segal Theatre, also located on the first floor, seats 70.

==== James Gallery ====
The ground floor of the CUNY Graduate Center houses the Amie and Tony James Gallery, also known as the James Gallery, which the Center for the Humanities oversees. The James Gallery intends to bring scholars and artists into dialog with one another and serve as a site for interdisciplinary research. The James Gallery hosts numerous exhibitions annually, and has hosted solo exhibitions by notable American and international artists such as Alison Knowles and Dor Guez.

=== CUNY TV and NYC Media ===
==== CUNY TV ====
The University's citywide cable channel, CUNY TV, broadcasts on cable and WNYE's digital terrestrial television subchannel 25.3. Its production studios and offices are located on the first floor, while the broadcast satellite dishes reside on the building's ninth floor (rooftop).

==== NYC Media ====
Sharing CUNY TV's main facilities is NYC Media, which is the official broadcast network and media production group of the NYC Mayor's Office of Media and Entertainment. The group includes WNYE-FM (91.5) radio station and WNYE-TV television channel (Channel 25), which also puts out "NYCLife" programming on 25.1 and "NYCGov" on 25.2, all broadcast 24/7 from within the building.

== Academics ==
National Program Rankings
Program	Ranking
Audiology	30
Biological Sciences	175
Chemistry	91
Computer Science	82
Criminal Justice	15
Earth Sciences	140
Economics	61
English	17
History	26
Mathematics	43
Physics	55
Political Science	63
Psychology	88
Sociology	26

Academic rankings

Global
- ARWU: 401-500

=== Rankings ===
In 2023, two doctoral programs at CUNY Graduate Center (criminal justice and English), were ranked among the top 20 graduate programs in the U.S., and four (audiology, history, philosophy, and sociology) among the top 30. In the 2016 edition of QS World University Rankings, CUNY Graduate Center's PhD program in Philosophy was ranked 44th globally. In the 2022 edition of the Philosophical Gourmet Report ranked CUNY Graduate Center's philosophy program 14th best in the United States and 16th best in English-speaking countries. In 2026, QS World University Rankings ranked CUNY Graduate Center's philosophy program 50-100 globally.

=== Faculty ===
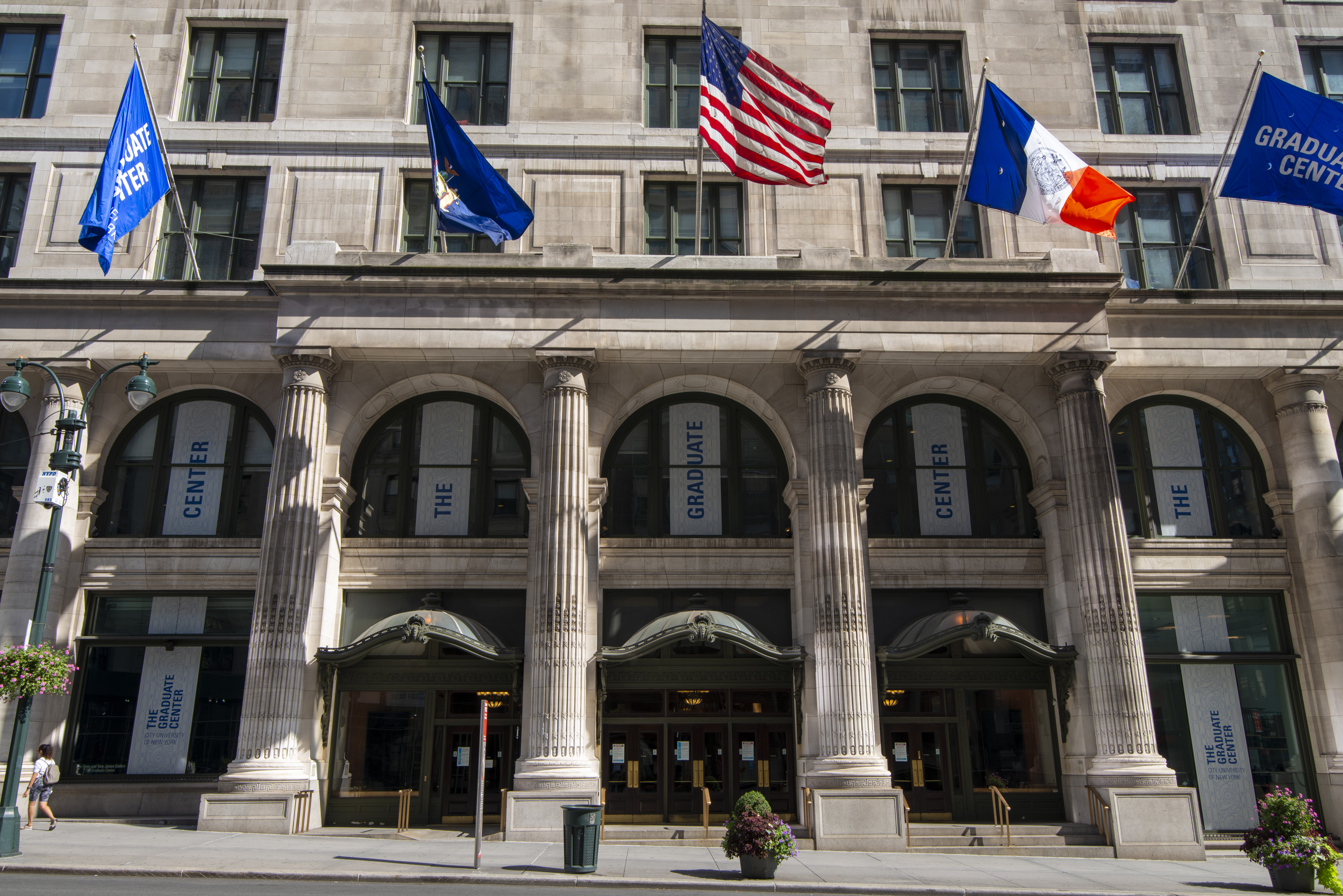
Entrance to the Graduate Center on Fifth Avenue

Faculty members include the recipients of the Nobel Prize, Pulitzer Prize, the National Humanities Medal, the National Medal of Science, the Schock Prize, the Bancroft Prize, Grammy Awards, the George Jean Nathan Award for Dramatic Criticism, Guggenheim Fellowships, the New York City Mayor's Award for Excellence in Science and Technology, the Presidential Early Career Awards for Scientists and Engineers, and memberships in the American Academy of Arts and Sciences and the National Academy of Sciences. Many departments are recognized internationally for their level of scholarship.

Courses in the social sciences, humanities, and mathematics, and courses in the sciences requiring no laboratory work convene at the Graduate Center. Due to the consortial nature of doctoral study at the CUNY Graduate Center, courses requiring laboratory work, courses for the clinical doctorates, and courses in business, criminal justice, engineering, and social welfare convene on CUNY college campuses.

=== Community ===
The CUNY Graduate Center pioneered the CUNY Academic Commons in 2009 to much praise. The CUNY Academic Commons is an online, academic social network for faculty, staff, and graduate students of the City University of New York (CUNY) system. Designed to foster conversation, collaboration, and connections among the 24 individual colleges that make up the university system, the site, founded in 2009, has quickly grown as a hub for the CUNY community, serving in the process to strengthen a growing group of digital scholars, teachers, and open-source projects at the university. The project has received awards and grants from the Alfred P. Sloan Foundation, the Sloan Consortium and was the winner of the 2013 Digital Humanities Award.

Also affiliated with the institution are four University Center programs: CUNY Baccalaureate for Unique and Interdisciplinary Studies through which undergraduates can earn individualized bachelor's degrees by completing courses at any of the CUNY colleges; the CUNY School of Professional Studies and the associated Joseph S. Murphy Institute for Worker Education and Labor Studies; the CUNY Graduate School of Journalism, which offers a master's degree in journalism; and Macaulay Honors College.

== Research ==
CUNY Graduate Center describes itself as "research-intensive" and is classified by the Carnegie Classification of Institutions of Higher Education to be an R1 or have "highest research activity". The CUNY Graduate Center's primary library, named after Mina Rees, is located on campus; however, its students also have borrowing privileges at the remaining 31 City University of New York libraries, which collectively house 6.2 million printed works and over 300,000 e-books. Beginning in 1968, the CUNY Graduate Center maintains a formal collaboration with the New York Public Library that allows faculty and students access to NYPL's extensive research collections, regular library resources, as well as three research study rooms located in the Stephen A. Schwarzman Building. Further, as of 2011, students have access to the libraries of Columbia University and New York University through the NYPL's Manhattan Research Library Initiative. The CUNY Graduate Center library also maintains an online repository called CUNY Academic Works, which hosts open-access faculty and student research.

=== Initiatives and committees ===
The CUNY Graduate Center does additional work through its initiatives and committees:

- Futures Initiative
- Graduate Center Digital Initiatives
- Initiative for the Theoretical Sciences (ITS)
- Revolutionizing American Studies Initiative
- The Committee for the Study of Religion
- The Committee on Globalization and Social Change
- The Committee for Interdisciplinary Science Studies
- Endangered Language Initiative
- Intellectual Publics

=== Centers and institutes ===
With over 30 research institutes and centers the CUNY Graduate Center produces work on a range of social, cultural, scientific and civic issues.

- Advanced Science Research Center
- American Social History Project/Center for Media and Learning
- Barry S. Brook Center for Music Research and Documentation (founded in 1989)
- Bildner Center for Western Hemisphere Studies
- Center for Jewish Studies
- Center for Advanced Study in Education (CASE)
- Center for Human Environments
- Center for Latin American, Iberian, and Latino Cultures
- Center for Place, Culture and Politics
- Center for the Humanities
- Center for the Study of Culture, Technology and Work
- Center for the Study of Women and Society
- Center for Urban Education Policy
- Center for Urban Research
- Center on Philanthropy and Civil Society
- CIDR: CUNY Institute for Demographic Research
- CLAGS: The Center for LGBTQ Studies
- Committee on Globalization and Social Change
- CUNY Institute for Software Design and Development (CISDD)
- CUNY Latin/Greek Institute
- European Union Studies Center
- Foundation for Iberian Music
- Gotham Center for New York City History
- Henri Peyre French Institute
- Howard Samuels Center
- Human Ecodynamics Research Center
- Institute for Language Education in Transcultural Context
- Institute for Research on the African Diaspora in the Americas & the Caribbean (IRADAC)
- Leon Levy Center for Biography
- Middle East and Middle Eastern American Center (MEMEAC)
- Martin E. Segal Theatre Center
- Ralph Bunche Institute for International Studies
- Research Center for Music Iconography (founded in 1972)
- Research Institute for the Study of Language in Urban Society (RISLUS)
- Saul Kripke Center
- Stone Center on Socio-Economic Inequality
- Teaching and Learning Center
- The Writers' Institute at The Graduate Center

=== American Social History Project ===
The American Social History Project/Center for Media and Learning (ASHP/CML) was established in 1981 to create and disseminate materials that help with understanding the diverse cultural and social history of the United States. Founded by Stephen Brier and Herbert Gutman, who sought to teach the history of everyday Americans, early projects included the film 1877: The Grand Army of Starvation, about the 1877 railway strike.

ASHP has created curriculum grounded in the work of Howard Zinn, Herbert Gutman, and Stephen Brier which aims to teach social studies at the high school level with the inclusion of diverse viewpoints, including indigenous groups, enslaved Americans, immigrants, and the working class. Notable curricula and teaching tools have included Freedom's Unfinished Revolution: An Inquiry into the Civil War and Reconstruction, and Who Built America? Other curriculum, such as Golden Lands, Working Hands, has focused on labor history; these types of ASHP materials emphasize collaborative teaching and learning strategies and have been popular in teaching districts that prioritize union labor.

Digital teaching resources created by ASHP have included the History Matters website and the online resource Liberté, Égalité, Fraternité: Exploring the French Revolution. As teaching tools, these websites place an emphasis on inclusion of primary source material for use in the classroom, alongside teaching strategies for seamless use of these documents in classroom curriculum. The online resource September 11 Digital Archive has received acclaim for its comprehensive representation of historic perspectives. ASHP is also a partner of the Mission US project and co-produced Mission US: Cheyenne Odyssey, an award-winning video game about a Cheyenne tribesman whose way of life is challenged by western expansion.

ASHP was established out of the success of a series of National Endowment for the Humanities summer seminars; seminar topics have included Learning to Look: Teaching Humanitites with Visual Images and New Media, Visual Culture of the American Civil War and its Aftermath, and LGBTQ+ Histories of the United States. This focus on professional development opportunities for educators has included other workshops such as the Bridging Historias: Latino/a History and Culture in the Community College Classroom program.

=== Stone Center on Socio-Economic Inequality ===
The James M. and Cathleen D. Stone Center on Socio-Economic Inequality was launched on September 1, 2016. The Stone Center expanded and replaced the Luxembourg Income Study (LIS) Center, which opened its doors at the Graduate Center in 2009. It began a post-doctoral program in 2019.

The Stone Center has hosted several scholarly convenings. One year after its launch, it hosted the 2017 Meeting Of The Society For The Study Of Economic Inequality (ECINEQ). In 2021, it convened wealth inequality scholars for the two-day conference, From Understanding Inequality to Reducing Inequality.

== Notable people ==
The CUNY Graduate Center has graduated 15,000 alumni worldwide, including numerous academics, politicians, artists, and entrepreneurs. As of 2016, the CUNY Graduate Center counted five MacArthur Foundation Fellows among its alumni, including writer Maggie Nelson as the most recent recipient. Among alumni graduated between 2003 and 2018, more than two-thirds are employed at educational institutions and over half have remained within New York City or its metro area.

Among the CUNY Graduate Center's alumni are leading scholars across numerous disciplines, including art historian and ACT-UP activist Douglas Crimp, political scientist Douglas Hale, anthropologist Faye Ginsburg, sociologist Michael P. Jacobson, historian Maurice Berger, and philosopher Nancy Fraser. The City University of New York has been acknowledged for its exceptional number of faculty and students who have been awarded nationally recognized prizes in poetry. Among this group include student Gregory Pardlo, winner of the 2015 Pulitzer Prize for Poetry

The CUNY Graduate Center holds a reputation for attracting established scholars to its faculty. In 2001, the CUNY Graduate Center initiated a five-year faculty recruitment campaign to hire additional renowned academics and public intellectuals in order to bolster the institution's faculty roster. Those recruited during the drive include André Aciman, Jean Anyon, Mitchell Duneier, Victor Kolyvagin, Robert Reid-Pharr and Saul Kripke.

The CUNY Graduate Center utilizes a unique consortium model, which hosts 140 faculty with sole appointments at the CUNY Graduate Center, most of whom are senior scholars in their respective disciplines, as well as draws upon 1,800 faculty from across the other CUNY schools to both teach classes and advise graduate students.

Notable faculty members include:

- Ervand Abrahamian – Historian
- André Aciman – Writer
- Ammiel Alcalay – Poet
- Andrea Alù – Material scientist
- Stanley Aronowitz – Sociologist
- Talal Asad – Anthropologist
- William Bialek – Biophysicist
- Claire Bishop – Art historian
- Emily Braun – Art historian
- Barry S. Brook – Musicologist
- Mary Ann Caws – Literary historian
- John Corigliano – Composer
- Cathy Davidson – English professor
- Philip Ewell – Music theorist
- Michelle Fine – Critical psychologist
- Marc Lamont Hill - Activist
- Ofelia García – Sociolinguist
- Ruth Wilson Gilmore – Geographer
- Romy Golan – Art historian
- Michael Grossman – Economist
- Robert Haralick – Computer Scientist
- David Harvey – Geographer
- Dagmar Herzog – Historian
- James Oakes – Historian
- David Nasaw – Historian
- Michio Kaku – Physicist
- Wayne Koestenbaum – Poet
- Victor Kolyvagin – Mathematician
- Paul Krugman – Economist
- Eric Lott – Literary critic
- Branko Milanović – Economist
- Stanley Milgram – Social psychologist
- Nancy K. Miller – Feminist theorist and memoirist
- Katherine Nelson – Developmental psychologist
- Frances Fox Piven – Political scientist
- Robert Reid-Pharr – Literary critic
- David S. Reynolds – Literary historian and biographer
- Paul Julian Smith – Spanish professor
- Dennis Sullivan – Mathematician

== Student life ==
Some CUNY Graduate Center students live in Graduate housing in East Harlem. The eight-story building includes a gym, laundry facilities, lounge and rooftop terrace. The Graduate housing opened in fall 2011 in conjunction with the construction of the Hunter College School of Social Work.

The Doctoral and Graduate Students' Council (DGSC) is the sole policy-making body representing students in doctoral and master's programs at the CUNY Graduate Center.

There are over forty doctoral student organizations ranging from the Middle Eastern Studies Organization and Africana Studies Group to the Prison Studies Group and the Immigration Working Group. These chartered organizations host conferences, publish online magazines, and create social events aimed at fostering a community for CUNY Graduate Center students.

Doctoral students at the CUNY Graduate Center also produce a newspaper funded by the DGSC and run by a committee of editors from the various doctoral programs. The paper, entitled The GC Advocate, comes out six times per academic year and is free for students, faculty, staff, and visitors.
