= Charlotte Roderuck =

American chemical biologist

Charlotte Elizabeth Roderuck
- Education: University of Iowa
- Scientific career
- Thesis: Analysis of Certain Components of Skeletal Muscle During Vitamin E Deficiency (1949)

Charlotte Roderuck (December 2, 1919 - July 7, 2007) was an American chemical biologist professor of nutrition at Iowa State College. She is known for her work researching children and female nutrition in order to better help the growth of children and how to provide adequate nutrition for pregnant women. She held the position of the Mary B. Welch Distinguished Professor at Iowa State College.

== Early life and education ==
Roderuck was born on December 2, 1919, in Walkerville, Maryland.

Roderuck began her academic journey at the University of Pittsburgh, where she graduated in 1940 with a Bachelor of Science in Chemistry. In 1942, Roderuck began a degree in Master of Science in organic chemistry at Washington State College. After which she worked for the Children's Fund of Michigan. In 1945, Roderuck published the article “Diet and Nutrition Status of Iowa School Children” which can be read in the National Library of Medicine. Then, Roderuck continued studying at the University of Iowa. In 1949, she obtained her PhD in biochemistry.

== Career ==
In 1948 Roderuck accepted a position as an assistant professor with the Food and Nutrition department at Iowa State College, and in 1951 she was promoted to associate professor and was full professor by 1954. In 1954, she achieved the rank of professor in 1954. In 1972 she was named the Mary B. Welch Distinguished Professor at Iowa State College.

From 1971 to 1972, Roderuck served as Assistant Dean of the Graduate College. In 1972, she became the assistant director of the Iowa Agriculture and Home Economics Experiment Station. Between 1975 and 1978, she was the Associate Dean of Home Economic Administration. In 1977 she was named as director of the World Food Institute at Iowa State.

== Research ==
Roderuck's early work examined the riboflavin and thiamine found in human milk. She went on to research multiple aspects of nutrition, including the nutritional state of women, levels of vitamin C in school children, and dietary considerations related to nutrition.

In 1964 and 1966, Roderuck worked with the home economic graduate program at the University of Baroda in Baroda, India. During that time, Roderuck worked on the research on the assessment of the nutrition of school children, a native tribal group called the Bills, and that of pregnant and breastfeeding women.

== Death ==
Roderuck died on July 7, 2007 in Ames, Iowa.

== Awards and honors ==
In 1951 Roderuck was awarded the Agnes Fay Morgan Research Award from Iota Sigma Pi which is given for research achievement in chemistry or biochemistry to a woman not over forty years of age at the time of nomination. Roderuck was the first person who got this award.
