= Malika Jeffries-EL =

American chemist

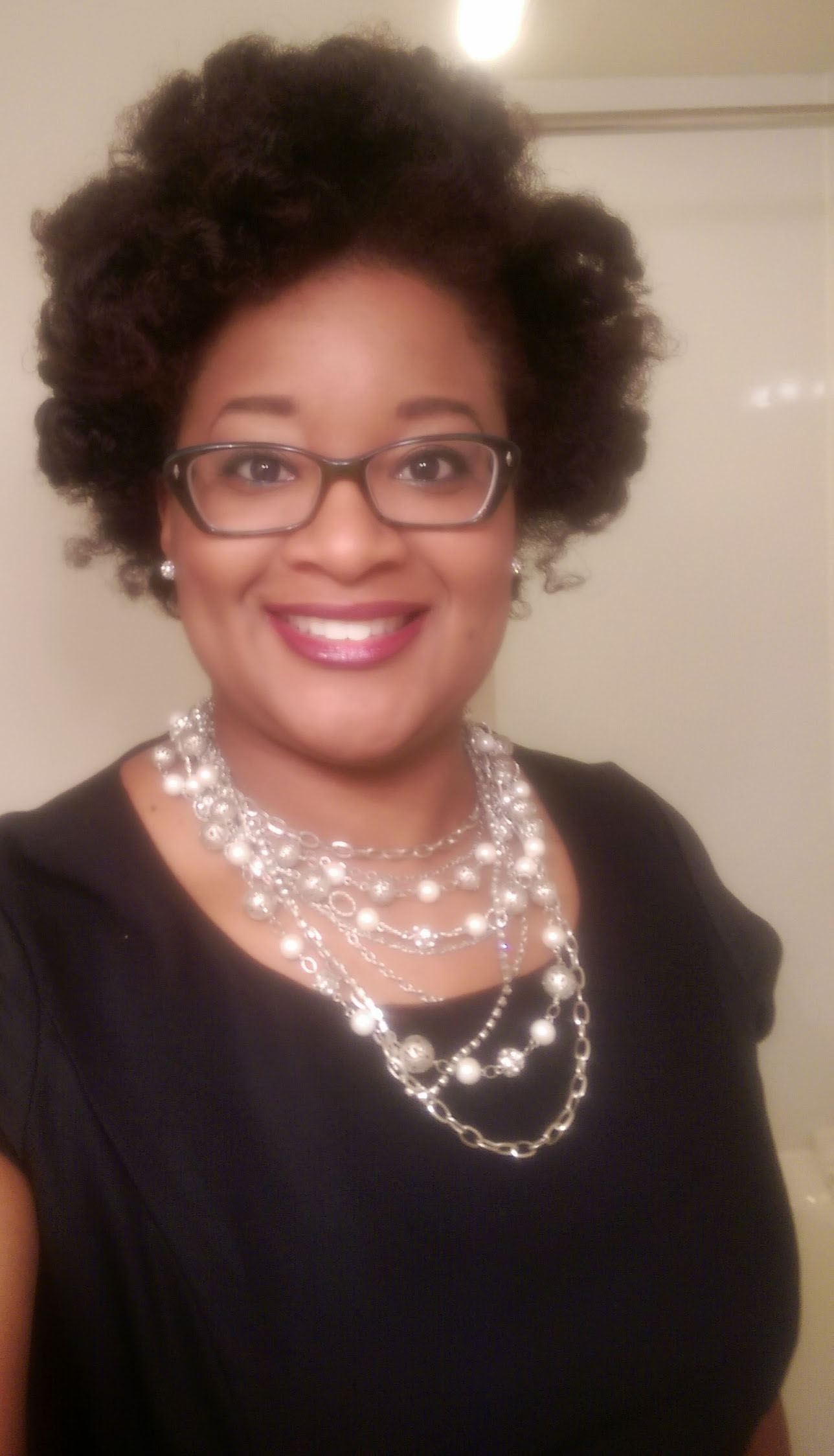
- Education: Wellesley College; George Washington University
- Awards: Fellow of the American Chemical Society (2018); National Science Foundation CAREER Award (2009)
- Scientific career
- Fields: Organic electronics
- Workplaces: Boston University; Iowa State University; Carnegie Mellon University
- Thesis: Synthesis and characterization of π-conjugated polymers utilizing A -B monomers (2002)
- Doctoral advisor: Richard M. Tarkka
- Other academic advisors: Richard D. McCullough
- Website: www.bu.edu/chemistry/profile/malika-jeffries-el/; www.chemdiva.com

Malika Jeffries-EL is an American chemist and Senior associate dean of the Graduate School of Arts & Sciences at Boston University studying organic semiconductors. Specifically, her research focuses on developing organic semiconductors that take advantage of the processing power of polymers and the electronic properties of semiconductors to create innovative electronic devices. She was elected as a Fellow of the American Chemical Society in 2018.

== Early life and education ==
Jeffries-EL is from Brooklyn, New York and was the first in her immediate family to attend college. She was inspired to become a scientist by Mae Jemison, an American engineer, physicist, and astronaut who was the first black woman to travel to space. Jeffries-EL earned BA degrees in Chemistry and Africana Studies from Wellesley College in 1996. In 1999 she earned her master's degree in chemistry from George Washington University (GWU). In 2002, Jeffries-EL completed her PhD in Synthetic Chemistry at GWU. Richard Tarkka supervised her.

== Research and career ==
After completing her PhD, Jeffries-EL worked as a postdoctoral fellow at Carnegie Mellon University under the supervision of Richard D. McCullough from 2002 to 2005. While there, she worked on the synthesis and field-effect mobility of polythiophene. In 2005, she joined the faculty at Iowa State University and was promoted to tenure in 2012. Jeffries-EL works on organic semiconductors.

Jeffries-EL served as a Martin Luther King visiting professor at Massachusetts Institute of Technology between 2014 and 2015. Here, her group focused on the synthesis of polymer building blocks, including heterocyclic electron-rich (donor) and electron-poor (acceptor) units. For electron-deficient units, Jeffries-EL develops benzobisazoles. She is interested in cross-conjugated organic semiconductors, including benzodifurans, as well as functional Polythiophenes. She uses the materials for organic solar cells, transistors and light-emitting diodes.

In 2015 Jeffries-EL was selected as the 8th Annual Goldstein Distinguished Lecturer by Cal Poly Pomona College of Engineering. She was the keynote speaker at the 2016 Northeastern Section of the American Chemical Society meeting.

In 2016 she joined Boston University as a tenured associate professor.

=== Advocacy and services to science ===
- Sigma Xi member
- National Organization for the Professional Advancement of Black Chemists and Chemical Engineers member
- Editorial advisory board for Chemical and Engineering News
- Editorial advisory board for the Society Committee on Education (SocEd)
- Advisory board for the Women Chemists of Colour program
- Arranged workshop at MIT for the 'Diverse Leaders of Tomorrow' (2011)
- Ran a series of National Science Foundation Early Career Investigator Workshops (2016)
- Participated in the Science Coalition's video campaign during the 2016 presidential elections
- Associate editor of the Journal of Materials Chemistry C
- Boston Women of Color Advisory Committee member
- Advisory board for Open Chemistry Collaborative in Diversity Equity (OXIDE)

=== Awards and honors ===
- 2008 – 3M, Nontenured Faculty Award
- 2008 – Science Spectrum Magazine, Emerald Honors for most promising minority scientist
- 2009 – NSF CAREER Award
- 2010 – National Organization of Black Chemists and Chemical Engineers, Lloyd Ferguson Award
- 2012 – American Chemical Society, Women Chemists Committee Rising Star Award
- 2014 – Agnes Fay Morgan Research Award, from Iota Sigma Pi
- 2015 – American Chemical Society, from Stanley C. Israel Regional Award for Advancing Diversity in the Chemical Sciences
- 2018 – Elected a fellow of the American Chemical Society (ACS). She was honoured by the American Chemical Society in 2018, becoming one of the 2% of their members to achieve the status of fellow.
- 2021 – National Organization for the Professional Advancement of Black Chemists and Chemical Engineers, Percy L. Julian Award.
- 2023 – Research Corporation for Science Advancement's Robert Holland Jr. Award for Research Excellence and Contributions to Diversity, Equity, and Inclusion.

== Notable publications ==
Jeffries-EL has nearly 100 publications. Some of her notable/highly cited publications include the following:

- Jeffries-EL, Malika; Sauvé, Geneviève; McCullough, Richard D. (December 2005). "Facile Synthesis of End-Functionalized Regioregular Poly(3-alkylthiophene)s via Modified Grignard Metathesis Reaction". Macromolecules. 38 (25): 10346–10352. Bibcode:2005MaMol..3810346J. doi:10.1021/ma051096q.
- Jeffries-EL, M.; Sauvé, G.; McCullough, R. D. (17 June 2004). "In-Situ End-Group Functionalization of Regioregular Poly(3-alkylthiophene) Using the Grignard Metathesis Polymerization Method". Advanced Materials. 16 (12): 1017–1019. Bibcode:2004AdM....16.1017J. doi:10.1002/adma.200400137. S2CID 98592398.
- Jeffries-EL, Malika; Kobilka, Brandon M.; Hale, Benjamin J. (11 November 2014). "Optimizing the Performance of Conjugated Polymers in Organic Photovoltaic Cells by Traversing Group 16". Macromolecules. 47 (21): 7253–7271. Bibcode:2014MaMol..47.7253J. doi:10.1021/ma501236v.
