= Sharon Hammes-Schiffer =

American physical chemist (born 1966)

- Born: Sharon Hammes-Schiffer; May 27, 1966 (age 60); Ithaca, New York, United States
- Education: Princeton University; Stanford University
- Known for: Computational chemistry
- Spouse: Peter Schiffer
- Father: Gordon Hammes
- Awards: Willard Gibbs Award (2021)
- Scientific career
- Fields: Chemistry; biophysical chemistry; physical chemistry; materials chemistry
- Workplaces: Princeton University
- Website: http://www.hammes-schiffer-group.org/

Sharon Hammes-Schiffer (born May 27, 1966) is a physical chemist who has contributed to theoretical and computational chemistry. She is currently the A. Barton Hepburn Professor of Chemistry at Princeton University. She has served as senior editor and deputy editor of the Journal of Physical Chemistry and advisory editor for Theoretical Chemistry Accounts. She is the editor-in-chief of Chemical Reviews.

Hammes-Schiffer studies "chemical reactions in solution, in proteins and at electrochemical interfaces, particularly the transfer of charged particles driving many chemical and biological processes." Her research draws upon the areas of chemistry, physics, biology, and computer science and is significant for the fields of biochemistry, inorganic chemistry, physical chemistry and physical organic chemistry. A theoretician who works with computational models, Hammes-Schiffer blends classical molecular dynamics and quantum mechanics into theories that have direct relevance to a variety of experimental areas. In studying proton, electron and proton coupled electron transfer, Hammes-Schiffer has formulated a general theory of proton-coupled electron transfer reactions that explains the behavior of protons in energy conversion processes. Her research has enhanced the understanding of hydrogen tunneling and protein motion in enzyme catalysis. Her research group has also developed a nuclear-electronic orbital approach that allows scientists to incorporate nuclear quantum effects into electronic structure calculations.

Her work has application to a variety of experimental results with implications for areas such as protein engineering, drug design, catalysis, solar cells (PVCs), and enzymatic reactions. In 2024, she was elected to the American Philosophical Society.

== Early life and education ==
Daughter to Gordon Hammes, an American biochemist very prominent in the field of enzymes, Sharon Hammes-Schiffer completed her B.A. in chemistry at Princeton University in 1988. She completed her Ph.D. in chemistry at Stanford University in 1993 after working with Hans C. Andersen. She then worked with John C. Tully at AT&T Bell Laboratories as a postdoctoral research scientist.

== Career ==
Hammes-Schiffer held positions on the faculty at the University of Notre Dame as Clare Boothe Luce Assistant Professor of Chemistry and Biochemistry (1995–2000) and at Pennsylvania State University (2000–2012). In 2012 she joined the University of Illinois at Urbana-Champaign as Swanlund Professor of Chemistry, where she remained until 2017. Since then, she has led the Hammes-Schiffer Research Group at Yale University, where she was named John Gamble Kirkwood Professor of Chemistry in 2018, and Sterling Professor of Chemistry in 2021. Starting January 2024, she joined the faculty at Princeton University. By February 2026, Hammes-Schiffer has been an author or co-author on nearly 650 publication, all of which culminated in more than 34000 citation. She also has given more than 200 invited talks.

== Research ==
Hammes-Schiffer's work delves primarily into three separate areas of chemistry: Proton-coupled electron transfer (PCET), Enzymatic Processes, and the Nuclear-Electronic Orbital method. A part of this research engages in the study of the Kinetic isotope effect, a difference in the reaction rate of a chemical based on what isotope is present.

=== Proton-coupled electron transfer (PCET) ===
The application of her work in PCET has elucidated the nature of various chemical mechanisms and led to her temperature dependence model of PCET rates. One such process, Quinol Oxidation, studied the Kinetic isotope effect on Ubiquinol and Plastoquinol with regards to temperature, finding that the free energy of activation is greater for hydrogen than for deuterium, meaning the reaction is slower for hydrogen and therefore irreversible, if specific conditions are satisfied. This finding has since been used by other investigators to reinforce the notion that reactions may or may not be unidirectional by influencing reaction rates with the kinetic isotope effect. Additionally, her study of PCET in Iron Bi-imidazoline complexes has refined common comprehension of PCET, having proven her theory that electron transfer rate increases under the kinetic isotope effect as "the proton transfer distance increases and the electron transfer distance decreases." These mechanisms have helped support the research of other PCET studies, with her main PCET paper, "Theoretical Studies of Proton-Coupled Electron Transfer Reactions", having been cited over 90 times by papers ranging from studying protein motion to enzyme dynamics.

=== Enzymatic processes ===
Hammes-Schiffer studies the effects of quantum tunnelling and hydrogen bonding on enzymatic reactions. Her work on Soybean Lipoxygenase-1 changed common perception of a previously proposed tunneling region diagram, finding that the temperature is inversely proportional to kinetic isotope effects (KIEs) while being directly proportional to the catalytic activity, This finding indicates that an active environmental dynamics decreases KIEs and promotes catalysis. This finding could be transferrable to other research on enzymes that similarly utilize proton transfer in their processes. This is because aren't as many enzymatic options for non-ionic transfer of a proton, therefore their utilization of proton tunneling could be potentially necessary to their enzymatic processes, which this work investigated and can aid in.

=== Nuclear-electronic orbital method (NEO) ===
Hammes-Schiffer has also pioneered work in what she calls the Nuclear-electronic orbital method (NEO) which allows for a more accurate estimate of nuclear properties such as density, geometry, frequencies, electronic coupling, and nuclear motions. As described in her paper, "Incorporation of Nuclear Quantum effects in electronic structure," Radial basis function kernel, a gaussian algorithm used to support vector machines, is applied to determine electronic and molecular orbitals. The NEO approach is specifically applicable in determining the exact mechanisms of hydrogen transfer reactions while accounting for other variables such as quantum tunneling and zero point energy. Hammes-Schiffer claims that the NEO approach is significantly advantageous over other methods that incorporate nuclear quantum effects because of the method's ability to calculate vibrational states, its avoidance of Born–Oppenheimer approximation and its apparent and inherent incorporation of quantum effects.

In her study, published in September 2016, Hammes-Schiffer contributed towards discovering the effects of the active site of the magnesium ion in the Scissile Phosphate cofactor complex. She discovered that rather than the magnesium ion lying in the center of the complex, it is located at a separate site, termed the Hoogsteen Face. This lowers the pKa of the complex in order to facilitate a deprotonation reaction necessary for a self-cleavage reaction.

== Honors and awards ==
Hammes-Schiffer is a Fellow of the American Physical Society (2010), the American Chemical Society (2011), the American Academy of Arts and Sciences (2012), the American Association for the Advancement of Science (2013), the National Academy of Sciences (2013), and the Biophysical Society (2015). She was elected as a member of the International Academy of Quantum Molecular Science in 2014.

Hammes-Schiffer has received a number of awards, including the following:

- 1996, Faculty Early Career Development (CAREER) Award, National Science Foundation (NSF), for her work on "The Incorporation of Quantum Effects in the Simulation of Proton Transfer Reactions"
- 2005, Iota Sigma Pi Agnes Fay Morgan Research Award
- 2005, International Academy of Quantum Molecular Science Medal
- 2008, American Chemical Society Akron Section Award
- 2011, "Method to Extend Research in Time" (MERIT) award, National Institutes of Health (NIH), a 10-year research grant to support her work
- 2020, Bourke Award of the Royal Society of Chemistry
- 2021, American Chemical Society Award in Theoretical Chemistry
- 2021, Willard Gibbs Medal Award from American Chemical Society Chicago Section
