= Gordon Hammes =

American chemist (born 1934)

- Born: 1934 (age 91–92); Fond du Lac, Wisconsin
- Education: Princeton University
- Known for: Enzyme kinetics and mechanism
- Relatives: Sharon Hammes-Schiffer (daughter)
- Awards: McKay Prize, ACS Award in Biological Chemistry
- Scientific career
- Fields: Biochemistry
- Workplaces: Max Planck Institute for Biophysical Chemistry, MIT, Cornell University, Duke University
- Academic advisors: Manfred Eigen, Robert Alberty

Gordon G. Hammes (born 1934 in Fond du Lac, Wisconsin) is a distinguished service professor of chemistry, emeritus, at Duke University, professor emeritus at Cornell University, and member of United States National Academy of Sciences. Hammes' research involves the study of enzyme mechanisms and enzyme regulation.

== Early life and education ==
Hammes was born in Fond du Lac, Wisconsin in 1934. He earned his B.A. from Princeton University in 1956 and his Ph.D. from the University of Wisconsin-Madison in 1959.

== Career ==
Hammes conducted postdoctoral research with Manfred Eigen at the Max Planck Institute for Biophysical Chemistry in Göttingen, Germany. He then secured a faculty position at the Massachusetts Institute of Technology before moving to Cornell University in 1965, where he was professor and chair of the department of chemistry. At Cornell University, he was the Horace White Professor of Chemistry and Biochemistry, as well the director and co-founder of the Cornell University Biotechnology Program. He spent some time at the University of California, Santa Barbara as vice-chancellor for academic affairs, and then joined the biochemistry faculty at Duke University in 1991. He served as vice chancellor of academic affairs at the Duke University Medical Center from 1991 through 1998.

Hammes was editor-in-chief of the American Chemical Society journal Biochemistry from 1992 until 2003, and president of the American Society for Biochemistry and Molecular Biology starting in 1994. The Gordon Hammes ACS Biochemistry Lectureship was established in 2009 in order to honor significant contributions to the field of biochemistry.

=== Research papers ===
Dr. Hammes is a world leader in the field of enzyme mechanisms and regulation, starting with work with Eigen on the temperature-jump technique and with Robert Alberty on diffusion-controlled reactions to enzyme kinetics. He studied the kinetic behavior of various enzymes, including glutamate-aspartate transaminase, hexokinase, and ribonuclease. He developed new methodologies that allowed a better understanding of enzyme catalysis, including fast reaction techniques, fluorescence spectroscopy, and single molecule microscopy. He was also one of the first to develop fluorescence energy transfer (FRET) as a technology to study distances between and within proteins. His work revolutionized the understanding of conformational changes and multiple intermediates in enzyme catalysis. Dr. Hammes has published more than 250 scientific articles.

=== Books ===
Books written by Hammes include the following:

Thermodynamics and Kinetics for the Biological Sciences (2000)

Spectroscopy for the Biological Sciences (2005)

Physical Chemistry for the Biological Sciences (2015) with his daughter Sharon Hammes-Schiffer

== Awards and distinctions ==
- 1956 – McKay Prize in Chemistry
- 1967 – American Chemical Society Award in Biological Chemistry
- 1967 – Eli Lilly Award in Biological Chemistry
- 2002 – American Society for Biochemistry and Molecular Biology William C. Rose Award
- 2008 – American Chemical Society Biochemistry Lectureship, Scholarship Award created in 2016
- 2009 – Vallee Foundation board of directors
