= Georgiopolis =

Georgiopolis, Greek for 'city of Georgios [George]', may refer to:

- the Byzantine name of ancient Lydda, which is the present-day Lod in Israel
- a 2009 publication on the early work of half-Jewish art photographer Dor Guez, whose mother was a Palestinian Christian from that city
- Georgioupoli, a resort and former municipality in the Chania regional unit of Crete
