= Leslie M. Hicks =

Chemist, researcher

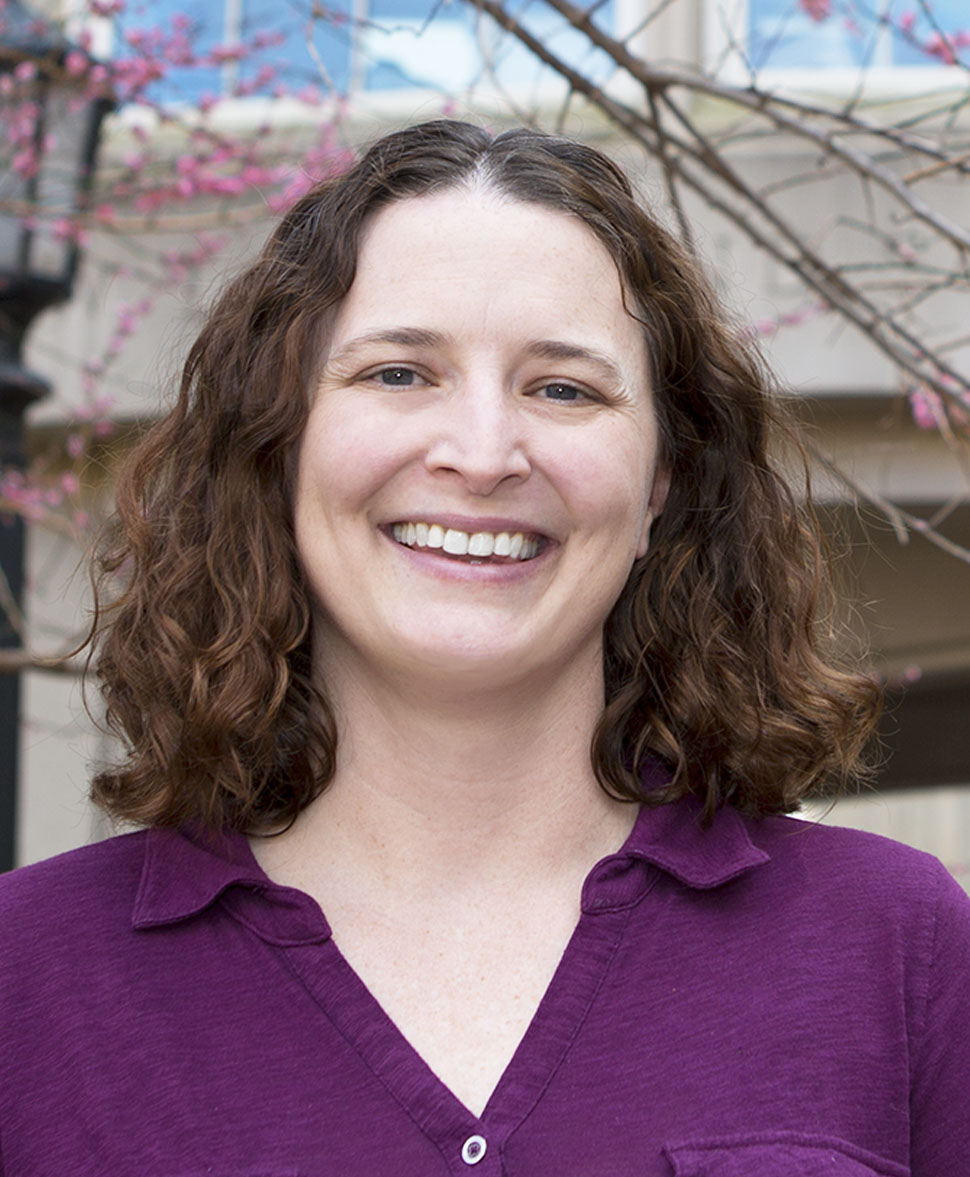
- Education: Marshall University; University of Illinois
- Awards: Agnes Fay Morgan Research Award, 2019; Eli Lilly Young Investigator Award in Analytical Chemistry, 2018; Robert J. Cotter New Investigator Award, 2018; NSF CAREER Award, 2015; Arthur C. Neish Young Investigator Award, 2014
- Scientific career
- Fields: Analytical Chemistry; Mass Spectrometry
- Doctoral advisor: Neil L. Kelleher
- Website: Group Page

Leslie Hicks is an American full professor of analytical chemistry at the University of North Carolina at Chapel Hill. Her work primarily focuses on the study of proteomics and protein post-translational modifications using mass spectrometry, and identifying biologically active peptides in plants.

== Career ==
Hicks earned her bachelor's degree at Marshall University in 2001, and went on to earn her doctorate at the University of Illinois Urbana-Champaign in 2005. She was an Assistant Member and Principal Investigator at the Donald Danforth Plant Science Center from 2006 to 2013, and an adjunct professor in the Department of Biology at Washington University in St. Louis before beginning her current position as a professor at UNC. She was named Chancellor’s Science Scholars Term Professor in 2022.

== Research ==
Hicks' research focuses largely on the development and implementation of mass spectrometric methods for protein identification and characterization. Recent work in the Hicks Lab has focused primarily on two areas. The first is the study of post-translational modifications and their role in regulation and development. The second involves a novel analytical pipeline for the discovery and characterization of antimicrobial peptides.

Hicks' research in post-translational modifications typically employs bottom-up proteomics using label-free quantification. Much of this research involves the model organism C. reinhardtii, an important organism in biofuel research due to its tendency to accumulate triacylglycerols. The Hicks Lab has studied the phosphoproteome of C. reinhardtii in order to examine underlying biological processes. Work has also been done to understand cell regulatory pathways, especially the algal analog of the mammalian TOR pathway. To a similar end, Hicks' group has extended its work to examine how the reversible oxidation of thiols plays a role in signaling and effector-triggered immunity.

The increasing threat of antimicrobial resistance has produced a need for novel antimicrobial agents. The Hicks Lab has investigated antimicrobial peptides as a potential source for new antibiotics. Recent work has involved the development of a comprehensive analytical approach using LC-MS for the identification of novel antimicrobial peptides from botanical, fungal, and bacterial sources.

== Awards and honors ==
- Agnes Fay Morgan Research Award, Iota Sigma Pi, 2019
- Marshall University College of Science Distinguished Alumni Award, 2019
- Eli Lilly Young Investigator Award in Analytical Chemistry, 2018
- US HUPO Robert J. Cotter New Investigator Award, 2018
- NSF CAREER Award, 2015
- Arthur C. Neish Young Investigator Award, 2014
- NSF Graduate Research Fellowship, 2002-2005
