= Robin L. Garrell =

American chemist

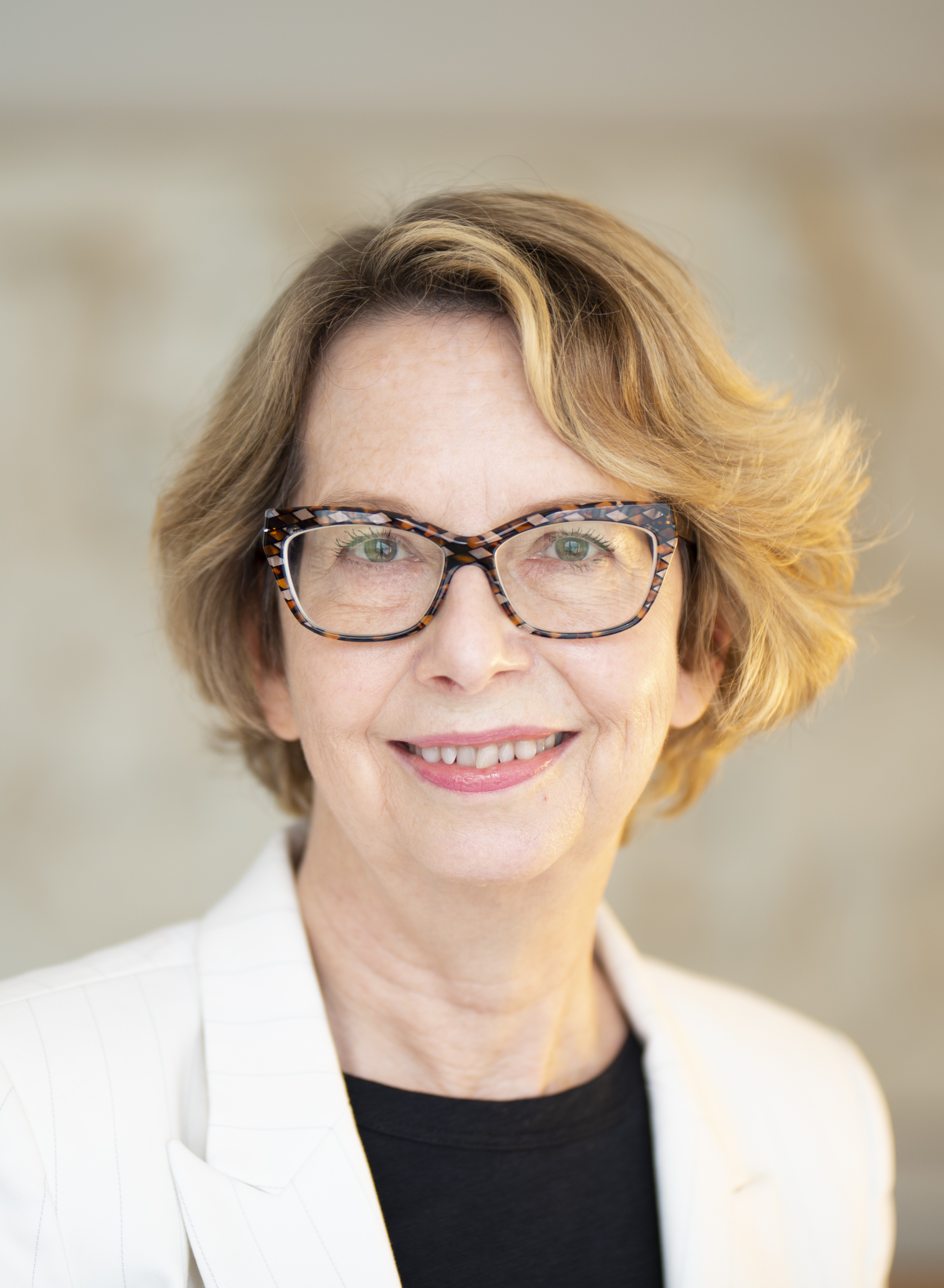

President of The Graduate Center, CUNY
- In office August 1, 2020 – September 29, 2023
- Preceded by: Chase F. Robinson
- Succeeded by: Joshua Brumberg

Personal details
- Education: Cornell University (B.A.); University of Michigan (M.S.Ph.D.)
- Occupation: University administrator, Chemist

Robin L. Garrell is an American chemist, academic and former president of The Graduate Center, CUNY. Until 2020, Garrell served as vice provost for graduate education and dean of graduate division at University of California, Los Angeles (UCLA). Prior to this role, Garrell was assistant professor at the University of Pittsburgh from 1984 to 1991, then joined the faculty in the department of chemistry and biochemistry at UCLA, where she became full professor and held a joint appointment in bioengineering. Garrell assumed her current position at The Graduate Center on August 1, 2020. On August 28, 2023, she announced that she would be stepping down as president of the CUNY Graduate Center effective September 29, 2023.

== Biography ==
A native of Detroit, Michigan, Robin L. Garrell received her B.S. degree in biochemistry with honors and distinction from Cornell University in 1978. While at Cornell, she worked with Stuart J. Edelstein to elucidate the structure of sickle cell hemoglobin fibers. Garrell enrolled in the PhD program in macromolecular science and engineering at the University of Michigan, where she worked with Samuel Krimm to develop surface-enhanced Raman spectroscopy as a technique for characterizing adsorption at liquid-metal interfaces. Garrell earned her M.S. and Ph.D. degrees from the University of Michigan in 1979 and 1984. She was then appointed assistant professor at the University of Pittsburgh, the first woman on the chemistry faculty. Garrell joined the faculty of University of California, Los Angeles in 1991, going on to become full professor in chemistry. She also held a joint appointment in bioengineering and was a member of the California NanoSystems Institute (CNSI). She is currently professor and vice provost and dean emerita.

Garrell served as chair of the UCLA College of Letters and Science Faculty Executive Committee (2003–2007) and chair of the UCLA Academic Senate (2009–2010), as well as special assistant for strategic initiatives in the office of the vice provost for intellectual property and industry relations (2010–2011). From 2011 through 2020, she served as vice provost for graduate education and dean of the graduate division. While at UCLA, Garrell co-led a multi-year project in partnership with UC Davis and funded by the Andrew G. Mellon Foundation, to advance holistic admissions in humanities and social science doctoral programs. Through grants from the National Science Foundation (NSF IGERT Materials Creation Training Program, NSF AGEP California Alliance) Garrell advanced interdisciplinary training and developed longitudinal and interinstitutional mentoring networks that support the advancement of diverse STEM scholars into faculty careers.

In March 2020, Garrell was appointed the president of The Graduate Center, CUNY in New York City. She served as president of the CUNY Graduate Center from 2020 to 2023. In the academic year 2022–2023, Garrell faced criticism to her leadership at The Graduate Center by different sectors of the institution, including a Statement of No Confidence signed by over 700 staff, faculty, and students, supported by the PSC local chapter, and by a resolution adopted at the Doctoral and Graduate Students Council, and followed by a Motion of No Confidence in the Senior Administration that took place in the Graduate Center's Graduate Council. The confrontations escalated to organized activism by the community. She resigned from her position as president in Fall 2023.

Garrell's leadership roles in science and higher education have included serving on and chairing the NIH Enabling Bioanalytical and Imaging Technologies Study Section, the American Association for the Advancement of Science (AAAS) Committee on Opportunities in Science, and the TOEFL Board of the Educational Testing Service (ETS), and also as a member of the ETS GRE Governing Board. In 2017, Garrell was elected to the Western Association of Schools and Colleges Senior College and University Commission (WSCUC). She previously served as President of the Society for Applied Spectroscopy (1999), and chaired the UCLA Academic Senate (2009–10) and the UCLA College Faculty Executive Committee (2003–2007). In the University of California system, Garrell led the development of system-wide policies on international activities, copyright and fair use. Garrell has served on the Advisory Boards of C&EN, Accounts of Chemical Research and Applied Spectroscopy, among other journals.

== Honors and awards ==
Garrell has received the National Science Foundation Presidential Young Investigator Award (1985), Iota Sigma Pi Agnes Fay Morgan Award (1996), Gold Medal Award in the 2007 Masscal Pioneering Micro and Thermal Analysis Technology Competition, and the Benedetti-Pichler Award from the American Microchemical Society (2007). UCLA honors include UCLA the Hanson Dow Award for Excellence in Teaching (1997) and Herbert Newby McCoy Award for Outstanding Research (1995), both from the Department of Chemistry and Biochemistry; the UCLA Distinguished Teaching Award (2003), the UCLA Gold Shield Faculty Prize (2009), the Graduate Students Association of UCLA James Lu Valle Distinguished Service Award for Administrators (2015), and the inaugural UCLA Centennial Award for Leadership in the Physical Sciences (2020). Garrell was elected a fellow of the American Association for the Advancement of Science in 2002 and Fellow in the Society for Applied Spectroscopy in 2009.

== Research ==
Garrell's research has centered on physical phenomena at liquid-solid interfaces, including adsorption, adhesion, wetting and electromechanical actuation. She pioneered surface-enhanced Raman spectroscopy as a tool for characterizing the behavior of biomolecules at liquid-metal interfaces, determined structures and stabilities of self-assembled monolayers, and enabled widespread use of SERS in sensors and diagnostics. Garrell also made significant advances in droplet microfluidics, showed how electric fields can be used to manipulate liquids and perform reactions on-chip, and developed multi-step processing of biological samples for MALDI-MS proteomics analysis and preparing three-dimensional cell cultures for in situ assays.

Garrell's research on mussel adhesive protein was featured in two television documentaries: Biomimicry (written by Janine Benyus, directed by Paul Lang, produced by Michael Allder for the Canadian Broadcasting Corporation, and based in part on the book Biomimicry, Innovation Inspired by Nature, by Janine Benyus) and The History of Glue documentary episode in the Modern Marvels Series, History Channel (Actuality Productions, ©2005).

== Selected publications ==
- Garrell, Robin L. (15 March 1989). "Surface-enhanced Raman spectroscopy". Analytical Chemistry. 61 (6): 401A–411A. doi:10.1021/ac00181a001.
- Herne, Tonya M.; Ahern, Angela; Garrell, Robin L. (January 1991). "Surface-enhanced Raman spectroscopy of peptides: preferential N-terminal adsorption on colloidal silver". Journal of the American Chemical Society. 113 (3): 846–854. Bibcode:1991JAChS.113..846H. doi:10.1021/ja00003a018. ISSN 0002-7863.
- Szafranski, Cory A.; Tanner, Weslene; Laibinis, Paul E.; Garrell, Robin L. (27 May 1998). "Surface-Enhanced Raman Spectroscopy of Aromatic Thiols and Disulfides on Gold Electrodes". Langmuir. 14 (13): 3570–3579. doi:10.1021/la9702502.
- Moon, Hyejin; Cho, Sung Kwon; Garrell, Robin L.; Kim, Chang-Jin "CJ" (October 2002). "Low voltage electrowetting-on-dielectric". Journal of Applied Physics. 92 (7): 4080–4087. Bibcode:2002JAP....92.4080M. doi:10.1063/1.1504171.
- Shapiro, Benjamin; Moon, Hyejin; Garrell, Robin L.; Kim, Chang-Jin "CJ" (May 2003). "Equilibrium behavior of sessile drops under surface tension, applied external fields, and material variations". Journal of Applied Physics. 93 (9): 5794–5811. Bibcode:2003JAP....93.5794S. doi:10.1063/1.1563828. S2CID 17264712.
- Yoon, Jeong-Yeol; Garrell, Robin L. (26 August 2003). "Preventing Biomolecular Adsorption in Electrowetting-Based Biofluidic Chips". Analytical Chemistry. 75 (19): 5097–5102. Bibcode:2003AnaCh..75.5097Y. doi:10.1021/ac0342673. PMID 27669630.
- Wheeler, Aaron R.; Moon, Hyejin; Kim, Chang-Jin "CJ"; Loo, Joseph A.; Garrell, Robin L. (3 July 2004). "Electrowetting-Based Microfluidics for Analysis of Peptides and Proteins by Matrix-Assisted Laser Desorption/Ionization Mass Spectrometry". Analytical Chemistry. 76 (16): 4833–4838. doi:10.1021/ac0498112. PMID 15307795.
- Chatterjee, Debalina; Hetayothin, Boonta; Wheeler, Aaron R.; King, Daniel J.; Garrell, Robin L. (2006). "Droplet-based microfluidics with nonaqueous solvents and solutions". Lab on a Chip. 6 (2): 199–206. doi:10.1039/B515566E. PMID 16450028.
- Moon, Hyejin; Wheeler, Aaron R.; Garrell, Robin L.; Loo, Joseph A.; Kim, Chang-Jin ?CJ? (2006). "An integrated digital microfluidic chip for multiplexed proteomic sample preparation and analysis by MALDI-MS". Lab on a Chip. 6 (9): 1213–1219. doi:10.1039/B601954D. PMID 16929401.
- Tucker-Schwartz, Alexander K.; Farrell, Richard A.; Garrell, Robin L. (5 July 2011). "Thiol–ene Click Reaction as a General Route to Functional Trialkoxysilanes for Surface Coating Applications". Journal of the American Chemical Society. 133 (29): 11026–11029. Bibcode:2011JAChS.13311026T. doi:10.1021/ja202292q. PMID 21728292.
- Fisher, Aaron J.; Mendoza-Denton, Rodolfo; Patt, Colette; Young, Ira; Eppig, Andrew; Garrell, Robin L.; Rees, Douglas C.; Nelson, Tenea W.; Richards, Mark A. (9 January 2019). "Structure and belonging: Pathways to success for underrepresented minority and women PhD students in STEM fields". PLOS ONE. 14 (1) e0209279. Bibcode:2019PLoSO..1409279F. doi:10.1371/journal.pone.0209279. PMC 6326412. PMID 30625173.
