= Emil T. Kaiser =

American biochemist

- Born: Emil Thomas Kaiser; February 15, 1938; Budapest
- Died: July 18, 1988 (aged 50)
- Education: University of Chicago (B.S.), Harvard University (Ph.D.)
- Known for: Research on enzyme modification
- Scientific career
- Fields: Biochemistry
- Workplaces: University of Chicago, Rockefeller University
- Doctoral students: William DeGrado
- Other notable students: Jean Chmielewski, Mohammadreza Ghadiri, Jeffery W. Kelly, David Scott Lawrence

Emil Thomas Kaiser (February 15, 1938 – July 18, 1988) was a Hungarian-born American biochemist. Kaiser was most notable for his research of enzyme modification.

He also was noted for developing new types of catalysts and for a more active form of a peptide hormone.

Chicago Tribune said that Kaiser "developed a whole new approach to synthetic chemistry".

Joshua Lederberg, a Nobel laureate and president of Rockefeller University in New York, said that Kaiser's research of "synthetic enzymes and other polypeptides advanced basic scientific understanding in ways that had important implications for medicine".

Kaiser was the Louis Block Professor at the University of Chicago, the Patrick E. and Beatrice M. Haggerty Professor at Rockefeller University, a member of the National Academy of Sciences, the American Academy of Arts and Sciences, the National Institutes of Health and the National Science Foundation.

== Life and career ==
Kaiser was born in Budapest, Hungary. He graduated from the University of Chicago with a B.S. degree, and received his Ph.D. from Harvard University. He joined the faculty of the University of Chicago in 1963, and advanced to the Louis Block Professorship in 1981. He moved to the Rockefeller University in 1982.
