= Richard D. McCullough =

American chemist and university administrator (born 1959)

Richard McCullough
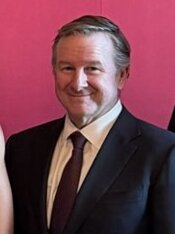
- McCullough in 2026

16th President of Florida State University
- Incumbent
- Assumed office August 16, 2021
- Preceded by: John E. Thrasher

Personal details
- Born: Richard Dean McCullough; April 9, 1959 (age 67) Dallas, Texas, U.S.
- Education: University of Texas, Dallas (BS); Johns Hopkins University (MS, PhD)

Academic background
- Thesis: Synthesis and development of heterocyclic chalcogen pi-donor molecules as components for organic metals (1998)
- Doctoral advisor: Dwaine O. Cowan

Academic work
- Institutions: Florida State University; Harvard University; Carnegie Mellon University
- Notable students: Undergrads: Jill Millstone; Post-docs: Malika Jeffries-EL

Richard Dean McCullough (born April 9, 1959) is an American chemist and entrepreneur who is the president of Florida State University. He previously served as Vice Provost for Research at Harvard University, where he was also a professor of Materials Science and Engineering in the John A. Paulson School of Engineering and Applied Sciences. In 2021 McCullough was selected to serve as the 16th president of Florida State University after the retirement of former President John E. Thrasher. He assumed office on August 16, 2021.

McCullough is best known for his work in developing printable electronic materials. McCullough was the Vice President for Research at Carnegie Mellon University in Pittsburgh from 2007 to 2012, where he had previously served as the Dean of the Mellon College of Science, and head of the Department of Chemistry.

== Early life and education ==
McCullough was born in Dallas, Texas in 1959. He received his B.S. in chemistry from the University of Texas, Dallas in 1982 and earned his Ph.D. in chemistry under Dwaine O. Cowan at Johns Hopkins University in 1988. He was a postdoctoral fellow at Columbia University for two years.

== Research and career ==
McCullough's research at Carnegie Mellon University focused on the self-assembly and synthesis of highly conductive organic polymers and oligimers, conjugated polymer sensors, nanoelectronic assembly and fabrication of molecular circuits and transistors, printable metals, new design methods and the synthesis of organic-inorganic hybrid nanomagnets and high-spin materials, crystal engineering and novel nanocrystalline semiconductor materials. In 1991, the McCullough group reported the first synthesis of regioregular head-to-tail coupled poly (3-alkylthiophenes).

=== Awards and honors ===
As co-founder and chief scientific officer for Plextronics, McCullough received the 2006 Carnegie Science Center Start-Up Entrepreneur Award. McCullough is a member of the American Chemical Society, receiving its Akron Award in 2002 and its Pittsburgh Award in 2007. In 2014, he was elected to the National Academy of Inventors. McCullough has published over one hundred articles, books, and book chapters and serves on the editorial boards of Advanced Materials and Advanced Electronic Materials.

== Personal life ==
McCullough is married with two sons and lives with his wife, Jai Vartikar, PhD, in Tallahassee, Florida.

While living in Pittsburgh, McCullough lived near Fred Rogers and appeared on Mister Rogers' Neighborhood three times with his son.

== See also ==
- List of Florida State University people
- List of presidents of Florida State University

Academic offices
Preceded by John E. Thrasher	President of Florida State University; 2021–present	Incumbent
