= Robert A. Alberty =

American chemist (1921–2014)

Robert Arnold Alberty
- Born: 21 June 1921; Winfield, Kansas, US
- Died: 18 January 2014 (aged 92); Cambridge, Massachusetts, US
- Education: University of Nebraska, University of Wisconsin–Madison
- Known for: enzyme kinetics, biochemical thermodynamics
- Scientific career
- Fields: Biophysical chemistry
- Notable students: Gordon Hammes

Robert Arnold Alberty (1921–2014) was an American biophysical chemist, professor emeritus at the Massachusetts Institute of Technology, and a member of the National Academy of Sciences.

Alberty earned bachelor's and master's degrees from the University of Nebraska in 1943 and 1944, respectively, then a doctoral degree from the University of Wisconsin–Madison in 1947. For his work in the area of biochemical thermodynamics, Alberty was elected to the National Academy of Sciences in 1965. In 1968 he was elected a Fellow of the American Academy of Arts and Sciences. He was dean of the MIT School of Science between 1967-1982.

Alberty is also known for his textbooks on physical chemistry, which have gone through many editions. The first one, Physical Chemistry, co-authored with Farrington Daniels, was published in 1957. More recent books of the same title have been co-authored with Robert J. Silbey and Moungi G. Bawendi (2004). Other works include Thermodynamics of Biochemical Reactions (2003) and Biochemical Thermodynamics: Applications of Mathematica (Methods of Biochemical Analysis) (2006).

He died in Cambridge, Massachusetts, at the age of 92 on January 18, 2014. Towards the end of his life he wrote a short account of his life and scientific career.

== Research ==
At the beginning of his career Alberty worked principally on aspects of electrophoresis in protein chemistry. After a period of 20 years away from academic research, when he had administrative responsibilities at MIT, together with work in the petroleum industry, he returned to biochemical research.

He became increasingly concerned with the kinetics and mechanisms of enzyme-catalysed reactions, initially studying fumarase in particular. He was among the first to consider the kinetics of reactions with more than one substrate, and in the years that followed there was hardly any aspect of enzyme kinetics he did not touch, his work including, for example, studies of pH, integrated rate equations, reversible reactions, effects of temperature, effects of buffers and inhibitors, and others.

Alberty's early interest in the ionization of adenosine phosphates and of thermodynamic aspects of biochemical reactions came to be his primary interest, and in his later years he had numerous publications on this topic, such as a compilation of the properties of ATP and related compounds. He worked with IUPAC on recommendations for presenting data for biochemical thermodynamics.

Although he was primarily concerned with single enzyme-catalysed reactions, Alberty also did some work with systems of more than one enzyme, such as the urea cycle.

== See also ==
Kenneth Burton
