= Jean Chmielewski =

American chemist

- Education: St. Joseph University; Columbia University
- Scientific career
- Workplaces: University of Purdue; University of California, Berkeley; Rockefeller University
- Thesis: Transaminase and racemase activity of pyridoxal/pryidoxamine enzyme analogs (1998)

Jean Chmielewski is an American chemist who is the Alice Watson Kramer Distinguished Professor at Purdue University. Her research considers drug discovery, nanobiotechnology and the cellular delivery of therapeutic agents. She was awarded the 2025 American Chemical Society Francis P. Garvan–John M. Olin Medal.

== Education ==
Chmielewski received her Bachelor of Science degree at Saint Joseph's University in 1983. Her undergraduate research developed prostaglandin oligomerization. She moved to Columbia University for her graduate studies, where she developed biomimetic chemistry with Ronald Breslow. She completed her National Institutes of Health (NIH) Postdoctoral Fellowship in 1990 at Rockefeller University and the University of California, Berkeley. At Rockefeller, Chmielewski was awarded an NIH postdoctoral fellowship, and worked with Emil T. Kaiser on peptide fragment coupling. At the University of California, Berkeley, Chmielewski developed covalent methods to stabilize peptide conformations.

== Career ==
Chmielewski began her tenure as a professor at Purdue University. Her early work looked to transform enzyme inhibitors for HIV/AIDS. She looks to create antibiotics that target intracellular pathogenic bacteria and agents that modulate drug efflux transporters.

== Achievements and awards ==
- 2001 Agnes Fay Morgan Research Award
- 2008 Elected Fellow of the American Association for the Advancement of Science
- 2011 Edward Leete Award in Organic Chemistry
- 2015 Vincent du Vigneaud Award
- 2017 Purdue University Herbert Newby McCoy Award
- 2017 Stanley C. Israel Regional Award for Advancing Diversity in the Chemical Sciences
- 2022 American Peptide Society Murray Goodman Award
- 2025 American Chemical Society Francis P. Garvan–John M. Olin Medal
