= Dwaine O. Cowan =

American chemist

- Born: 25 November 1935; Fresno, California, U.S.
- Died: 5 May 2006 (aged 70); Clovis, California, U.S.
- Education: Fresno State College; Stanford University
- Known for: Molecular Solids; Organometallic Chemistry; Photochemistry; Metallocenes
- Scientific career
- Fields: Chemistry
- Workplaces: Johns Hopkins University
- Doctoral advisor: Harry Stone Mosher
- Other academic advisors: George S. Hammond
- Doctoral students: Richard D. McCullough

Dwaine O. Cowan (25 November 1935 – 5 May 2006) was an American chemist. He was a professor of chemistry at Johns Hopkins University. He is best known for his pioneering work in the field of organic conductors. His other research interests included organometallic chemistry, organic photochemistry, organic chemistry, metallocenes and the synthesis of heterocyclic compounds containing sulfur, selenium, and tellurium.

== Education ==
He received a B.S. in chemistry from Fresno State College in 1958 and a Ph.D. in chemistry from Harry Stone Mosher at Stanford University in 1962.

== Research ==
Cowan was a popular figure in physical organic chemistry during his thirty-year career. He is considered to be the father of "organic conductors and superconductors", an area of science and technology that cuts across the disciplines of chemistry, physics and materials science.

Cowan was invited to contribute a special report titled "The Organic Solid State" on the subject of organic conductors to Chemical and Engineering News (July 21, 1986).

Cowan and his students have authored 190 scientific articles, four patents and two monographs. He co-authored a book with Ronald Drisko entitled Elements of Organic Photochemistry (ISBN 978-1-4684-2130-9).

== Personal life ==
He was preceded in death by his wife, LaVon "Bonnie" Adams Cowan; and his parents Oliver and EvaBelle Cowan.

== Awards ==
He received a number of major awards including Alfred P. Sloan Foundation Fellowship (1968-1970), Guggenheim Fellowship, University of Basel, Switzerland (1970-1971), elected Fellow of the American Association for the Advancement of Science (1989) and the Alexander von Humboldt Senior Scientist for the University of Heidelberg, Germany (1992- 1993).
