= Steven M. Cahn =

American philosopher and academic administrator

- Born: 1942 (age 83–84); Springfield, Massachusetts, U.S.
- Education: Columbia University (BA, PhD)
- Scientific career
- Fields: Philosophy
- Workplaces: Dartmouth College; Vassar College; University of Rochester; New York University; University of Vermont; Graduate Center of the City University of New York

Steven M. Cahn (born 1942) is an American philosopher and academic administrator who served as Provost and Acting President of the Graduate Center of the City University of New York.

== Biography ==
Cahn was born in Springfield, Massachusetts in 1942, performed extensively as a pianist and organist, graduated from Columbia College in 1963 and received his PhD from Columbia University in 1966.

After graduating from Columbia, Cahn taught at Dartmouth College, Vassar College, and the University of Rochester.

From 1968 to 1973, he was a professor and served in various administrative roles at New York University. He then joined the University of Vermont as a professor from 1973 to 1980, heading the department of philosophy. Between 1978 and 1983 Cahn held executive positions in the Exxon Education Foundation, the Rockefeller Foundation and the National Endowment for the Humanities, where he was the Director of General Programs.

He joined the Graduate Center of the City University of New York as Dean of Graduate Studies in 1983, before being promoted to Provost and Vice President for Academic Affairs. Upon the death of President Harold Proshansky, Cahn was appointed acting president of the Graduate Center in Spring 1991. He stepped down as Provost in 1992 and returned to his teaching post, serving as a professor of philosophy and urban education. In 2015, he became professor emeritus.

Cahn is the author of twenty books and editor of fifty others, including the popular philosophy textbooks Political Philosophy: The Essential Texts; Exploring Philosophy: An Introductory Anthology; Exploring Ethics: An Introductory Anthology; Ethics: History, Theory, and Contemporary Issues; and Classics of Western Philosophy.

== Published works ==
Cahn is known for his work on fatalism, religious belief, happiness, and academic ethics, as well as his interest in the teaching of philosophy. Among his major works are Fate, Logic and Time; Religion Within Reason; Saints and Scamps: Ethics in Academia; From Student to Scholar: A Candid Guide to Becoming a Professor: 25th Anniversary Edition, (with Christine Vitrano) Happiness and Goodness: Philosophical Reflections on Living Well; Philosophical Adventures; Inside Academia: Professors, Politics, and Policies; Navigating Academic Life; and Professors as Teachers. His shorter philosophical writings are collected in a trilogy: The Road Traveled and Other Essays (which includes an autobiographical account of his career);

A Philosopher's Journey: Essays from Six Decades; and Philosophical Debates. A collection of essays written in his honor, edited by two of his former doctoral students, Robert B. Talisse of Vanderbilt University and Maureen Eckert of the University of Massachusetts Dartmouth, is titled A Teacher's Life: Essays for Steven M. Cahn.
