= CUNY Academic Commons =

Online academic social network

- Website: CUNY Academic Commons

The CUNY Academic Commons is an online, academic social network for community members of the City University of New York (CUNY) system. Founded in 2009 to foster communication, collaboration, and community-building among CUNY's 25 colleges, the Commons now serves as a dedicated platform for sharing scholarship and connecting faculty, graduate students, and undergraduates. As of 2025, the platform has registered over 53,000 members and hosts more than 34,000 sites, 2,000 groups, and 3,000 courses. The open-source web framework powering the CUNY Academic Commons is available through the Commons In a Box project.

== Background ==
The Commons originated from discussions among CUNY faculty and technologists in the late 2000s, who saw a need for a university-wide digital space that encouraged collaboration beyond individual campuses. A 2008 white paper from the CUNY Committee on Academic Technology outlined the initial vision, emphasizing the importance of an open-source, faculty-driven platform to support interdisciplinary work. This document became a foundational blueprint for the Commons, leading to its beta launch in early 2009 and full release by the end of that year.

At the time, CUNY operated as what Gold and Otte (2011) called a "loose federation" of campuses, marked by static websites and limited cross-campus interaction. The absence of a system-wide venue for scholarly exchange and community-building contributed to what scholars described as a problem of institutional silos. Addressing this fragmentation became a key design imperative. The platform aimed not only to counter the prospect of missed connections but to support the kind of serendipitous, interest-driven discovery that static campus infrastructures typically foreclosed.

While initially limited to CUNY faculty and graduate students, early adoption was driven by instructors seeking alternatives to learning management systems. A significant shift in 2017 involved both a membership cleanup and the decision to extend access to CUNY undergraduates, marking a new phase of growth for the platform.

== Open infrastructure ==
The Commons is built on WordPress Multisite, enhanced by BuddyPress, and uses MySQL databases on Linux-based hosting. Previously hosted by the CUNY Graduate Center, the Commons migrated to Reclaim Hosting in January 2025, a service specializing in academic institutions. Custom plugins and tools allow members to create groups, build personalized blogs, and manage collaborative projects. The project’s public GitHub repositories include Commons-specific WordPress and BuddyPress extensions for courses, group libraries, and SAML single sign-on, as well as earlier plugins developed for group announcements, Google Drive embedding, domain-restricted registration, and networked student writing. The Commons development team regularly updates the platform with new features, maintaining its open-source ethos while integrating community feedback to refine user experience and technical capabilities.

== A pedagogical hub ==
The CUNY Academic Commons has expanded over time to incorporate more robust group and site functionality, becoming both a hub for sharing pedagogical resources and as a tool for teaching courses. Although the Commons was initially developed for faculty, administration, staff, and graduate students, the site opened to undergraduate students in 2017 and experienced significant growth over subsequent years.

Faculty use the platform as an open-source supplement to the university-wide Brightspace learning management system (LMS). While popular LMS software such as Brightspace or Blackboard aims to provide academic course spaces for individual courses within institutions, the Commons is designed to facilitate conversation and collaboration among colleagues both within and between colleges in the system. In light of its do-it-yourself, open-source approach to scholarly communication, the Commons has been characterized as an alternative to LMS systems. In contrast to the LMS model, however, the site neither supports a formal grading system nor does it connect to CUNYfirst, the university's student portal.

Other teaching projects at CUNY that share the open-source ethos and do-it-yourself approach of the Commons include Manifold,Blogs@Baruch, Eportfolios@Macaulay (2007-2025) now OpenLab at Macaulay, OpenLab at City Tech, and Looking for Whitman.

== Member contributions ==
CUNY Academic Commons logo

Students, faculty, and staff contribute to the platform via websites and groups used for teaching, research, and collaboration. This includes course delivery, resource sharing, professional networking, creative work, blogging, and research dissemination.

=== Course sites and groups ===
Faculty use the CUNY Academic Commons for course management and delivery. Courses can be organized as dedicated websites, as course groups, or as a hybrid of both, allowing instructors to choose the approach that best fits their pedagogical needs. This versatility not only supports a variety of teaching strategies but also enables the platform to function alongside—or even replace—traditional systems like Blackboard. In addition, the Commons offers an accessible repository of open courses via its 'Courses' tab. Faculty who have used the Commons for teaching have noted its benefits for student engagement, particularly in courses that emphasize collaborative writing, public scholarship, or open pedagogy. A survey conducted by the Graduate Center's Teaching and Learning Center found that faculty who transitioned from closed platforms to the Commons appreciated the increased student agency and accessibility of course materials.

=== Open educational resources ===
Members create and share a range of interdisciplinary open educational resources (OER) to support teaching and learning. For instance, the TLC Assignment Library provides openly licensed and adaptable assignments developed by CUNY instructors, while TLH in a Box offers instructional templates, budget models, and strategies for student engagement. Similarly, Natural Sciences Open Educational Resources provides zero-textbook-cost materials for biology, chemistry, and physics courses at LaGuardia Community College.

Additionally, the platform hosts campus-based OER guides and professional learning spaces, such as the Brooklyn College Quick OER Guide and the BMCC Open Pedagogy Seminar. It also hosts the OER COIL Starter Kit, which supports Collaborative Online International Learning (COIL), a teaching model that connects classrooms across institutions and countries through shared coursework.

In 2023, the CUNY Academic Commons launched an OER Showcase to highlight exemplary open course materials and teaching resources across its network. The initiative was developed in collaboration with the CUNY Office of Library Services and aggregates Commons-hosted OER to make them more discoverable and widely accessible. This aligns with university-wide efforts to reduce textbook costs and promote open knowledge, situating the Commons as a hub for open pedagogy within the CUNY system.

=== Research, blogs, and portfolios ===
Students, faculty, and staff use the Commons to share research, blogs, and academic portfolios in the form of WordPress sites and opt-in features like the Public CV. Major research databases and digital humanities projects are hosted on the platform, including the Northeast Slavery Records Index (NESRI) at John Jay College, a searchable compilation of records identifying enslaved persons and enslavers in the Northeastern United States. Institutional blogs like the GC Mina Rees Library Blog provide ongoing updates about library resources, collections, and services to the CUNY community. Other institutional research and cultural heritage projects hosted on the Commons include the Brooklyn College Library Art Collection, an online catalogue of paintings, drawings, sculptures, and photography that includes digital reproductions, brief descriptions, suggested readings, and links to museum and gallery exhibitions, as well as the Hostos Community College Latin American Writers Institute (LAWI), which promotes Latin American, Caribbean, Latinx, and Ibero-American literature in the United States and manages the publication of Hostos Review/ Revista Hostosiana, a multilingual literary journal.

== Grants and recognition ==
In 2011, the project received a $107,500 grant from the Alfred P. Sloan Foundation to create "Commons in a Box" for organizations to reuse the open-source web framework of the Commons. In the following year, the project was also awarded the Sloan Consortium's Effective Practices Award for innovation in online and blended education.

In 2016, the Commons received a $324,502 National Endowment for the Humanities Digital Humanities Implementation Grant to develop Commons In A Box OpenLab (CBOX-OL), an open-source learning environment designed to enable sharing and collaboration across humanities courses.

The Commons has also been recognized for its role in advancing open scholarly communication. In 2023, it received an Open Infrastructure Award from the Open Knowledge Foundation for its sustained commitment to supporting faculty and students in publishing open-access research and course materials. This award highlighted the Commons' impact in democratizing access to academic content and providing CUNY scholars with a platform for digital collaboration.

In 2024, the project was awarded a $250,000 NEH grant to establish the Open Education Publishing Institute (OEPI), a program designed to help digital humanities scholars create openly licensed resources with an emphasis on community engagement and diverse or underrepresented perspectives.

== See also ==
- WordPress
- BuddyPress
- MediaWiki

== Sources and further reading ==
- Kaya, T. (2010). "CUNY Social Network Mixes Scholarship With Facebook-Style Friendship." Chronicle of Higher Education. Retrieved from http://chronicle.com/blogs/wiredcampus/cuny-social-network-mixes-scholarship-with-facebook-style-friendship/27266
- Parry. (2010). "WordPress a Better LMS." Chronicle of Higher Education. Retrieved from http://chronicle.com/blogs/profhacker/wordpress-a-better-lms/23050
- Degl'innocenti, J. (2010, December 20). "The 20 Most Outstanding BuddyPress sites of 2010." Retrieved March 25, 2011, from https://web.archive.org/web/20110805140057/http://buddydress.com/2010/12/the-20-most-outstanding-buddypress-sites-of-2010-by-jerome-degl%E2%80%99innocenti
- Kaya, T. (2010). "New College Social Networks, Unlike Facebook, Foster Academic Interaction." Chronicle of Higher Education. Retrieved from http://chronicle.com/article/New-College-Networks-Unlike/124871/
- Nantel, R. (2010, October 1). "Internal Social Networks May Help Break Down Institutional Silos." Retrieved March 21, 2011, from http://www.brandon-hall.com/workplacelearningtoday/?p=12348
- Lamb, B., & Groom, J. (2010). "Never Mind the Edupunks; or, The Great Web 2.0 Swindle" EDUCAUSE. July/August 2010, 45(4), 50–58. Retrieved from https://web.archive.org/web/20110406075133/http://www.educause.edu/EDUCAUSE+Review/EDUCAUSEReviewMagazineVolume45/NeverMindtheEdupunksorTheGreat/209326
- Gold, M. (2011). "Beyond Friending: BuddyPress and the Social, Networked, Open-Source Classroom." Learning Through Digital Media Experiments in Technology and Pedagogy. Retrieved from https://web.archive.org/web/20110621111244/http://learningthroughdigitalmedia.net/beyond-friending-buddypress-and-the-social-networked-open-source-classroom
- Gold, M. (2011). "The CUNY Academic Commons announces the Commons in a Box project." Academic Commons News. Retrieved August 4, 2012, from http://news.commons.gc.cuny.edu/2011/11/22/the-cuny-academic-commons-announces-the-commons-in-a-box-project/
- Gold, Matthew; Otte, George (February 2011). "The CUNY Academic Commons: fostering faculty use of the social web". On the Horizon. 19 (1): 24–32. doi:10.1108/10748121111107681.
- Gong, K. (2011, March 2). "The CUNY Academic Commons: Building the Social University." Collaborative Learning Center, Yale University. Retrieved March 19, 2011, from http://clc.yale.edu/2011/03/02/the-cuny-academic-commons-building-the-social-university/
- Ambrose, S. (2011, February 22). "15 Go-To Places for WordPress and BuddyPress News, Tips and Tutorials." WordPress News at WPMU.org. Retrieved June 8, 2011, from https://web.archive.org/web/20110723021140/http://wpmu.org/15-go-to-places-for-wordpress-and-buddypress-news-tips-and-tutorials/
- Roel, R. (2010, April 1). "A Facebook for Faculty." CUNY Matters. April 2010. Retrieved June 8, 2011, from http://www.cuny.edu/news/publications/cunymatters/april2010/facebook-for-faculty.html
- Hanley, Larry (2011). "Mashing Up the Institution: Teacher as Bricoleur". The Radical Teacher (90): 9–14. doi:10.5406/radicalteacher.90.0009. S2CID 146556916.
- Jones, K. & Farrington, P. (2012). "Learning from Libraries Using WordPress: Content-Management System Best Practices and Case Studies." ALA Editions. [Forthcoming] Retrieved June 8, 2011 from http://www.alatechsource.org/taxonomy/term/106/using-wordpress-as-a-library-content-management-system
- Howard, J. (2011). "Creating new academic networks with 'Commons in a Box'." Chronicle of Higher Education. Retrieved August 5, 2012 from http://chronicle.com/blogs/wiredcampus/creating-new-academic-networks-with-commons-in-a-box/34453
