= Agnes Fay Morgan =

American chemist

- Born: May 4, 1884; Peoria, Illinois
- Died: July 20, 1968 (aged 84)
- Education: University of Chicago
- Known for: A science-based home economics program
- Awards: Garvan Medal (1949)
- Scientific career
- Fields: Chemistry, home economics
- Workplaces: University of California
- Doctoral advisor: Julius Stieglitz

Agnes Fay Morgan (May 4, 1884 – July 20, 1968) was an American chemist and academic. She was the longtime chair of the home economics program at the University of California. Her program was strongly grounded in science, and students admitted into the program were required to have a level of science education that was not typical of home economics programs at the time. Morgan was one of the earliest married female college professors in the United States.

A graduate of the University of Chicago, Morgan held brief teaching appointments at smaller schools before earning a doctorate and taking the position at Berkeley. Morgan's lab conducted significant research into the nutritional composition of foods and the biochemistry of vitamins, especially pantothenic acid (vitamin B_{5}). Her work correlated decreasing bone density with increasing age and connected serum cholesterol levels with dietary fat intake. Her work also focused on the influence of storage and heat processing on food values.

Morgan remained associated with Berkeley for more than 50 years, and though she retired in 1954, she was active in her field until just before her death. She received the Garvan Medal from the American Chemical Society and the Borden Research Award from the Borden Company Foundation. At Berkeley, the campus nutrition laboratory is named in her honor. Iota Sigma Pi, an American chemistry honor society, presents the Agnes Fay Morgan Research Award to outstanding women in the field.

== Early life ==
Agnes Fay was born in 1884 in Peoria, Illinois. Her parents were Patrick Fay and his second wife, the former Mary Dooley. Patrick and Mary Fay had come from Galway, Ireland. He was a manual laborer and then a builder. Agnes Fay was the third of the family's four children, one of two girls and two boys. A graduate of Peoria High School, Fay received a full college scholarship from a local donor. She went to Vassar College for a short time before transferring to the University of Chicago.

Fay enrolled at the University of Chicago as a physics major, but she changed her major to chemistry after taking a course in that subject from Julius Stieglitz. He was an influential chemist who became a member of the National Academy of Sciences and president of the American Chemical Society. Fay completed a bachelor's degree and a master's degree in chemistry in 1904 and 1905, respectively. For about a year, Fay was a college chemistry instructor, though there are conflicting sources as to the name of the college. (Note: Sicherman (1980) lists the school as Hardin College in Mexico, Missouri. Nerad (1999) says that the college was Hardin–Simmons College in Montana. There is a Hardin–Simmons University (formerly Hardin–Simmons College) in Texas, but it was known simply as Simmons College during the early 20th century.) While serving as a chemistry professor at Hardin-Simmons College, Fay was characterized by her unorthodox behavior; this vibrant, unconventional personality, which distinguished Fay from her counterparts, was also mentioned at an event in 1965 honoring her legacy.

At the research symposium that honored her in 1965, Morgan emphasized that the scientific accomplishments that were attributed ot her were the result of approximately 100 women researchers. They helped develop ideas, conducted experiments, and they wrote their findings."

While teaching at the University of Montana in 1907–08, Fay married Arthur I. Morgan, who was a senior football player at the university. Though Fay had been Morgan's chemistry teacher, Morgan was four years older than Fay, having enrolled at Montana after military service in the Spanish–American War. Arthur Morgan became the headmaster of a boys' school and later worked for the Sperry Flour Company, becoming its vice president.

After teaching at the University of Washington from 1910 to 1912, Morgan completed a Ph.D. in chemistry at the University of Chicago in 1914. Stieglitz supervised her dissertation. She may have been the only married woman to have received a Ph.D. in chemistry in the first few years of the 20th century. Married women were not generally welcome on university faculties (female professors were usually expected to resign when they married), but Stieglitz agreed to write a recommendation letter for Morgan for a position at the University of Illinois. Stieglitz noted in his letter that the university should overlook Morgan's marital status because her husband was ill at the time.

== Career at Berkeley ==
=== Early years ===
It is not known whether the University of Illinois extended an offer to Morgan, but in any case, she interviewed for a faculty position at Berkeley in the Department of Home Economics. She had an interview scheduled with the college's dean, but he sent his wife and his teenage daughter to conduct it. She accepted the position, which paid $1,800; male faculty members at the university were paid $2,400 with a doctorate and $1,800 without one. When Morgan arrived at Berkeley, she found that she had to teach courses in nutrition and dietetics. In 1915, Morgan became a faculty member in the Nutrition department at the University of California at Berkeley. Despite her chemistry background, she characterized dietetics as "a subject I knew nothing about and nobody else knew much about at that time." She said that she had to research the curriculum "mostly out of German medical journals."

One of Morgan's stated interests was to lead a program of research into household practices; she did not want to teach traditional home economics principles if they could not be supported by science. This meant that her students were required to possess a science background that was more stringent than other U.S. home economics programs, and also that her graduates found themselves prepared for roles that had not usually been open to traditional home economics graduates, such as hospital nutrition management and teaching in the basic sciences.

Even among women in academia, Morgan was unusual in that she came from an immigrant family of modest means. In many ways, Morgan was also atypical as a home economist. She disliked cooking and housekeeping, and her style of dress was generally described as "dowdy" for the first two decades of her time at Berkeley. Since women could not access most parts of the existing Berkeley Faculty Club, Morgan helped to establish the Women's Faculty Club on campus. It was used as a meeting place for lunches and dinners as well as a residence for female faculty members and campus visitors.

Morgan's department always faced financial struggles in an era before much federal research funding was available. To raise funds, Morgan provided food service educational courses to teachers, nurses and other participants, but these classes ultimately weakened the department's standing within the school, as university officials viewed the training as vocational and considered it to be beneath the standards of the university. Because of this, Morgan was prohibited from accepting industry funding for research and the university provided her with very little space to conduct her research work. Adding to the difficulty of the situation was that university officials had previously criticized Morgan for maintaining academic standards that were too high for a home economics program.

The issue of offering vocational training was part of a larger challenge for Morgan in her first few years at the university. Because of the school's status as a land-grant university, the program was required to follow California State Department of Education directives to produce graduates trained as teachers, agricultural extension specialists and dietitians. However, Benjamin Ide Wheeler, president of the university in the early 20th century, saw those fields as vocations, and he encouraged Morgan to continue her focus on science.

=== Department leadership, motherhood and later career ===
From 1916 through her retirement in 1954, Morgan was a department chair or co-chair. In 1919, the leadership of the Department of Home Economics was split between Morgan (as the head of the household science division) and Mary Patterson (as the head of the household arts division). Morgan was not fond of sharing a department with Patterson, who had a background in decorative arts and no inclination toward science. By 1920, Berkeley president David Prescott Barrows agreed to Morgan's request to separate the two divisions into distinct departments since they had different curricula, philosophies and faculty, and Morgan became the sole chair of the Department of Household Science. Despite pushback from university administration to keep the program strictly vocational, Morgan advocated to protect her department's scientific requirements resulting in graduates who were recruited for medical and laboratory roles.

Morgan waited until her academic rank was secure before becoming pregnant. She had a son named Arthur Ivason Jr. in 1923, the same year that she became a full professor. Colleagues were surprised when she had the baby, as she had not mentioned being pregnant and she hid the physical evidence of her pregnancy with her long laboratory jacket. Morgan remembered the reaction of one male colleague when she told him the news; he said if she had five children as he did, she would have hardly noticed the new baby. Morgan's mother moved in with her and cared for the baby so that Morgan could work uninterrupted.

In the mid-1920s, Morgan foresaw the eventual need for graduate education in nutrition. She said that dietitians would not be fully appreciated within the medical field without a strong grounding in science and an ability to implement the research findings of laboratory scientists. Wanting to establish dietetics as a profession rather than a service industry, Morgan emphasized the "cleavage of the dietitian to the physician's end of the hospital table, and away from the nurse's." This statement itself had little effect at the time, however, as dietetics remained primarily concerned with the practical aspects of feeding people in the hospital.

As a department chair, Morgan was known as a stern leader. Though she attracted top faculty members, Morgan was looked upon fearfully by many in home economics. Some faculty members felt that Morgan always thought she was right. Ruth Okey, one of Morgan's colleagues, said,

"Some of her staff learned to suggest a change indirectly in such a way that Dr. Morgan was convinced that the idea was her own, otherwise her response was likely to be, 'Nonsense!' This characteristic was responsible for the brief stays of several very able staff appointees."

=== Research and writing ===
Some of the most significant scientific research to emerge from Morgan's laboratory concerned the biochemistry of vitamins and the nutritional value of foods. She wrote 254 publications that included papers on effects of heat. Specifically, she studied the effects of heat processing on the nutritional value of food. She became best known for her work examining the effects of pantothenic acid (vitamin B_{5}) on adrenal gland function. In her early research work, Morgan analyzed processed foods and characterized their vitamin composition. She was the first to establish that a preservative, sulfur dioxide, protected vitamin C but damaged thiamine. Morgan's research contributed to early understanding of vitamins and food composition, and she helped to establish nutrition as a scientific discipline in the US.From Morgan's contributions in the nutrition safety industry, led to the discovery and characterization of vitamin E, vitamin B6, pantothenic acid, and vitamin K.

In 1938, the Department of Home Economics was moved under the College of Agriculture, and all of the faculty members became affiliated with the California Agricultural Experiment Station. Late in her career, she was involved in an Agricultural Experiment Station project that examined nutrition among older people in San Mateo County. That work yielded two important conclusions: that bone density began to decline in women between the ages of 50 and 65, and that dietary fat intake led to increases in serum cholesterol.

In another of her studies, Morgan worked with a fox breeder to study the effects of diets that contained low and normal amounts of B vitamins. The treatment group (the vitamin-restricted foxes) developed a fine, sparse gray coat that resembled the fashionable fur of the silver fox. Morgan found that the foxes with normal intake of B vitamins had shiny black fur. After the experiments, a fur stole was made out of fur from both the treatment and control groups. Morgan wore the stole on at least two important occasions – her presentation of the study data in 1939 and her Garvan Medal award ceremony ten years later.

Morgan was sometimes sought to investigate public problems on behalf of federal or state governments. She examined the food quality at San Quentin Prison in 1939, and in the 1940s she was the founding chair of the California Nutrition War Committee and served on the Office of Scientific Research and Development. In 1960, Morgan was a member of a committee that looked at the toxicity of pesticides used in agriculture. She co-authored a textbook, Experimental Food Study, with Irene Sanborn Hall, and she wrote detailed histories of the Alpha Nu and Iota Sigma Pi honor societies.

== Later life and legacy ==
In addition to winning the Garvan Medal in 1949, which is bestowed upon outstanding women in chemistry by the American Chemical Society, Garvan became the first female professor named Faculty Research Lecturer at Berkeley in 1951; Morgan was selected for the honor by her Berkeley faculty colleagues. In 1954, Morgan and Wayne State University researcher Arthur H. Smith were the co-winners of the Borden Research Award from the Borden Company Foundation. She was honored at a symposium themed "Landmarks of a Half-Century of Nutrition Research" on May 8th,1965.

Though she officially retired in 1954, Morgan continued to come to the office for nearly the rest of her life. Just after Morgan's retirement, the University of California System decided to offer home economics only at the Davis and Santa Barbara campuses, and the nutrition program was continued at Berkeley. Forty of her papers were published after her retirement date. Following a heart attack in early July 1968, Morgan died on July 20 in Berkeley. At the time of her death, she still headed the selection committee for new fellows of the American Institute of Nutrition.

In 1961, the nutrition laboratory at Berkeley was renamed Agnes Fay Morgan Hall. The Iota Sigma Pi chemistry honor society issues the Agnes Fay Morgan Research Award to recognize women who make outstanding contributions to the field. Morgan had been a founding member of the group and she had served the national organization as its permanent historian for many years..
