= Kim K. Baldridge =

American theoretical and computational chemist

Kim K. Baldridge is an American theoretical and computational chemist who works to develop quantum mechanical methodologies and apply quantum chemical methods to problems in life sciences, materials science, and general studies. She is professor and vice dean in the School of Pharmaceutical Science and Technology of Tianjin University in China, where she also directs the High Performance Computing Center.

== Education and career ==
Baldridge is originally from Minot, North Dakota, and graduated from Minot State University in 1982. She earned her Ph.D. in 1988 from North Dakota State University working under the supervision of Mark S. Gordon, and was a postdoctoral researcher at Wesleyan University until 1994. After becoming a scientist at the San Diego Supercomputer Center, she became a visiting professor at the University of California, San Diego in 1995, and continued to work at the San Diego Supercomputer Center and hold an adjunct professorship at the university before becoming a professor of theoretical chemistry at the University of Zurich in Switzerland in 2004. She moved to Tianjin University in 2014, following her husband Jay S. Siegel, who became dean of Pharmaceutical Science and Technology at Tianjin in 2013.

== Research ==
Much of Baldridge's research involves finding better ways to use quantum mechanical methodologies to study complex molecules. For example, she used quantum mechanical approaches to study reaction paths and rates, inclusion of solvent effects, and evaluation of DFT functionals with dispersion correction for studying large polynuclear aromatic molecules.

Baldridge has contributed to quantum mechanical computer programs such as GAMESS (US), QMView, and GEMSTONE. GAMESS stands for General Atomic and Molecular Electronic System, and is an advanced chemistry program for calculations including generalized valence bond, the Hartree-Fock method, and density functional theory.

== Awards and recognition ==
Minot State University named Baldridge to their Academic Hall of Fame in 2013. Baldridge is a Fellow of the American Physical Society and was elected an American Association for the Advancement of Science Chemistry Fellow in 2001. She was given a 2019 Distinguished Women in Chemistry or Chemical Engineering Award by the International Union of Pure and Applied Chemistry (IUPAC), the only winner from Asia. The award was won for her work in developing and applying quantum chemistry programs in molecular science, for pioneering women-in-science symposia, and for championing for chemical safety in China.
