= Alanna Schepartz =

American biochemist

- Born: January 9, 1962 (age 64); New York, City, U.S.
- Education: State University of New York Albany; Columbia University; California Institute of Technology
- Known for: Creative application of chemical principles to understand and control biological recognition and function
- Awards: Agnes Fay Morgan Research Award
- Scientific career
- Fields: Chemical biology
- Workplaces: University of California, Berkeley; Yale University
- Thesis: Carboxypeptidase A: models and mechanism (1987)
- Doctoral advisor: Ronald Breslow
- Other academic advisors: Peter Dervan

Alanna Schepartz (born January 9, 1962) is an American professor and scientist. She is currently the T.Z. and Irmgard Chu Distinguished Chair in Chemistry at University of California, Berkeley. She was formerly the Sterling Professor of Chemistry at Yale University.

== Early life and education ==
Alanna Schepartz was born on January 9, 1962, in New York City and was raised in Rego Park, Queens. She graduated from Forest Hills High School in 1978 at the age of 16. She then earned a B.S. degree in chemistry from the State University of New York, Albany and a PhD degree in Organic Chemistry from Columbia University, where she worked under the supervision of Ronald Breslow. Following an N.I.H. postdoctoral fellowship with Peter Dervan at the California Institute of Technology, she joined the faculty at Yale University in July 1988.

== Yale career ==
Schepartz joined the faculty at Yale University in July 1988. She was promoted to associate professor in 1992, to Full Professor with tenure in 1995, and was named the Milton Harris, '29 PhD Professor of Chemistry in 2000. In 2001, she was named a professor in the Department of Molecular, Cellular, and Developmental Biology. From 2002 to 2007, she held a Howard Hughes Medical Institute Professorship. In 2017, she was named a Sterling Professor, Yale's highest faculty honor. Schepartz is the first woman to be granted tenure in Yale's Department of Chemistry, and the first female Full Professor in any physical sciences department at Yale.

== Field of study ==
Schepartz works in the field known as chemical biology. Her laboratory is well known for the creative application of chemical principles to understand and control biological recognition and function. Her research has guided thinking in multiple areas of chemical biology, including the understanding of how specificity is achieved during protein-DNA and protein-protein recognition processes; how to design molecules ("miniature proteins") that function as inhibitors of protein-protein interactions; how these molecules can be engineered to reach the cell cytosol intact and with high efficiency; and the development of β-peptides as protein ligands and as building blocks of protein-like architectures. The development of β-peptide bundles was cited by Chemical and Engineering News, a weekly news magazine of the chemical world, as one of 2007's “most important research advances”.

In 2017, Schepartz was appointed by Yale as Sterling Professor of Chemistry.

In 2019, she joined UC Berkeley College of Chemistry.

== Schepartz Laboratory ==
Schepartz is the Principal Investigator at the Schepartz Laboratory of Chemical Biology. According to the Schepartz Laboratory Website, the laboratory "develops chemical tools to study and manipulate protein–protein and protein–DNA interactions inside the cell. Our approach centers on the design of molecules that nature did not synthesize—miniature proteins, β-peptide foldamers, polyproline hairpins, and proto-fluorescent ligands—and the use of these molecules to answer biological questions that would otherwise be nearly impossible to address. Current topics include the use of miniature proteins to identify the functional role of discrete protein-protein interactions and rewire cellular circuits, the use of cell permeable molecules to image misfolded proteins or protein interactions in live cells, and the design of protein-like assemblies of β-peptides that are entirely devoid of α-amino acids."

== Achievements ==
In 1990, Schepartz was awarded a David and Lucile Packard Foundation Fellowship. In 1991, Schepartz earned an Eli Lilly Biochemistry Fellowship, a Morse Faculty Fellowship from Yale, and a National Science Foundation Presidential Young Investigator Award. In 1993, she earned a Camille and Henry Dreyfus Teacher-Scholar Award, and in 1994 received an Alfred P. Sloan Research Fellowship. Schepartz received an A.C.S. Arthur C. Cope Scholar Award in 1995 and an A.C.S. Eli Lilly Award in Biological Chemistry in 1997. In 1999, she received the Dylan Hixon ’88 Award for Teaching Excellence in the Natural Sciences, and in 2002, she was awarded the Agnes Fay Morgan Research Award. In 2008, she was awarded the Frank H. Westheimer Prize Medal from Harvard University. In 2012, she was awarded the Ronald Breslow Award for Achievement in Biomimetic Chemistry. Throughout her career she has also been invited to be a distinguished guest speaker and lecturer. In 2014, she was elected to membership in the National Academy of Sciences.

Since 2005, she had served as an associate editor of the Journal of the American Chemical Society, and in 2016 was appointed as editor-in-chief of Biochemistry.

== Selected academic publications ==
- Helical β-peptide inhibitors of the p53-hDM2 interaction. Joshua A Kritzer, James D Lear, Michael E Hodsdon, and Alanna Schepartz. Journal of the American Chemical Society. 2004.
- The ecstasy and agony of assay interference compounds. Courtney Aldrich, Carolyn Bertozzi, Gunda I Georg, Laura Kiessling, Craig Lindsley, Dennis Liotta, Kenneth M Merz Jr, Alanna Schepartz, Shaomeng Wang. ACS Chemical Neuroscience. 2017.
- High-resolution structure of a β-peptide bundle. Douglas S Daniels, E James Petersson, Jade X Qiu, Alanna Schepartz. Journal of the American Chemical Society. 2007.
- Inhibiting HIV fusion with a β-peptide foldamer. Olen M Stephens, Sunghwan Kim, Brett D Welch, Michael E Hodsdon, Michael S Kay, and Alanna Schepartz. Journal of the American Chemical Society. 2005.
