= Tamar Schlick =

American mathematician

Tamar Schlick is an American applied mathematician who works as a professor of chemistry, mathematics, and computer science at New York University. Her research involves developing and applying tools for modeling and simulating biomolecules.

== Education and career ==
Schlick did her undergraduate studies at Wayne State University, graduating in 1982 with a B.S. in mathematics. She continued her graduate studies at the Courant Institute of Mathematical Sciences at New York University, completing a Ph.D. in applied mathematics in 1987 under the supervision of Charles S. Peskin.

After postdoctoral studies at NYU and the Weizmann Institute of Science, she returned as a faculty member to NYU in 1989.

== Recognition ==
She is a fellow of the American Association for the Advancement of Science (2004), American Physical Society (2005), Biophysical Society (2012), and Society for Industrial and Applied Mathematics (2012).
