= Biochemistry (journal) =

- December 2008 cover for Biochemistry
- Discipline: Biochemistry
- Language: English
- Edited by: Alanna Schepartz

Publication details
- History: 1962–present
- Publisher: American Chemical Society (United States)
- Frequency: weekly
- Open access: Hybrid
- Impact factor: 2.9 (2022)

Standard abbreviations
- ISO 4: Biochemistry

Indexing
- ISSN: 0006-2960 (print); 1520-4995 (web)

Links
- Journal homepage; RSS feed

Biochemistry is a peer-reviewed academic journal in the field of biochemistry. Founded in 1962, the journal is now published weekly by the American Chemical Society, with 51 or 52 annual issues. According to the Journal Citation Reports, the journal has a 2022 impact factor of 2.9.

The previous editor-in-chief was Richard N. Armstrong (Vanderbilt University School of Medicine) (2004–2016). After his death, Alanna Schepartz (UC Berkeley) was appointed editor-in-chief.

== Indexing ==
Biochemistry is indexed in:

- CAB International
- Chemical Abstracts Service
- EBSCOhost
- Gale Group
- MEDLINE/Index medicus
- Ovid
- ProQuest
- Scopus
- SwetsWise
- Web of Science
