= Dor Guez =

Dor Guez Munayer
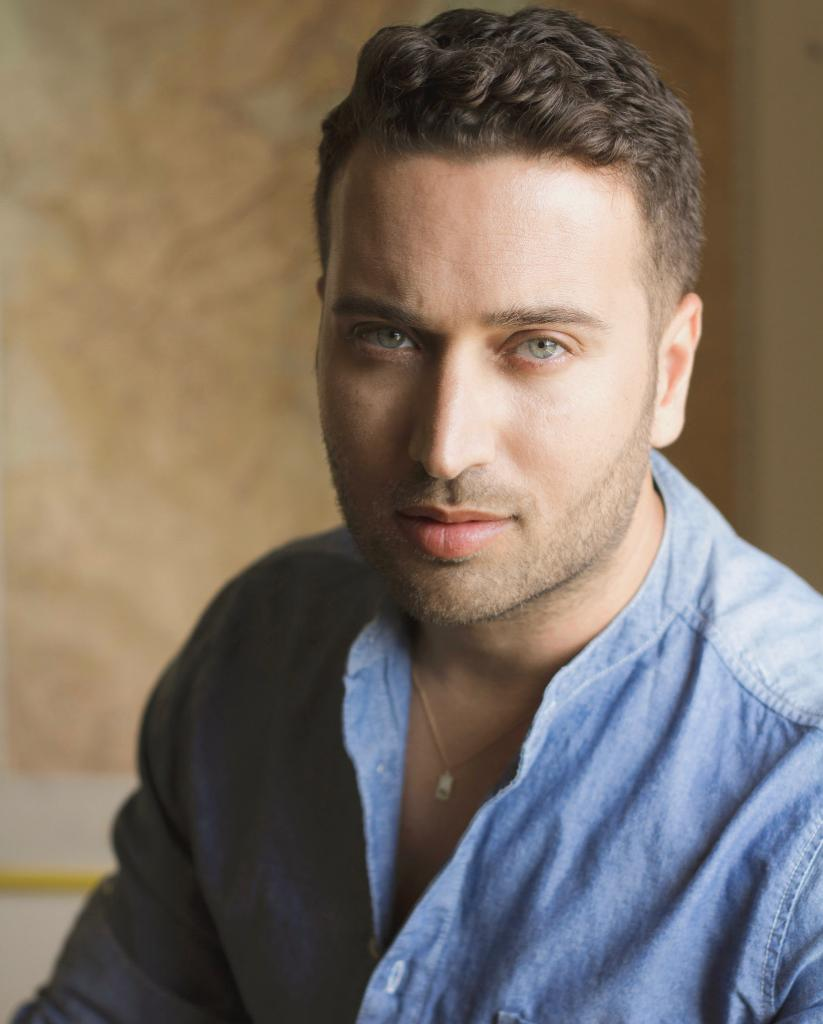
- Born: Jerusalem
- Occupation: Artist

Dor Guez Munayer is an artist born in Jerusalem, working across photography, video, installation, sculpture, and performance. His practice examines how historical knowledge is recorded, transmitted, and reinterpreted through images, archives, oral histories, landscapes, architecture, and material objects. His work draws on the histories of his Palestinian family from Lydda and his Jewish family from Tunisia.

== Biography and Artistic Practice ==
Guez’s early work focused on three generations of his maternal family and the Palestinian community in Lydda. Combining family photographs, personal documents, oral testimonies, archival materials, photography, and film, his work examines the relationship between personal and communal accounts and broader historical narratives.

Other bodies of work have drawn on the experiences of his Jewish family from Tunisia.

Since the mid-2000s, Guez has developed long-term projects based on repeated research into particular places, archives, landscapes, and architectural sites. His work considers how photographs, documents, environments, and material objects function as forms of historical evidence, and how their meanings change over time.

== Private life ==
Dor Guez is openly gay and is married to American stylist Darnell Ross. The have two children. Guez studio is based in Athens.

=== SeaPort Art Center for Curatorial Research ===
In 2018, Guez founded SeaPort Art Center for Curatorial Research, an independent artist-led platform based in Athens, where he serves as director. SeaPort supports curatorial research through residencies, public programs, and collaborations.

== Exhibitions ==
Guez has presented solo exhibitions internationally at institutions including Laboratorio Arte Alameda, Mexico City; Princeton University Art Museum; MAMBO – Museum of Modern Art, Bogotá; the Institute of Contemporary Arts, London; Museum of Contemporary Art Detroit; Rose Art Museum, Brandeis University; Museum for Islamic Art, Jerusalem; DEPO, Istanbul; and KW Institute for Contemporary Art, Berlin.

His work has been included in the Berlin Biennale, Istanbul Biennial, Videobrasil, Bienal de Arte Paiz, and Videonale, as well as exhibitions at Palais de Tokyo, Paris; MAXXI, Rome; ZKM, Karlsruhe; K21 – Kunstsammlung Nordrhein-Westfalen, Düsseldorf; The Jewish Museum, New York; and Institut du Monde Arabe, Paris.

Guez has also presented performances at institutions including Centre Pompidou, Paris; Princeton University Art Museum; and KW Institute for Contemporary Art, Berlin.

== Public collections ==
Guez’s works are held in public collections including Tate Modern, London; Centre Pompidou, Paris; Los Angeles County Museum of Art (LACMA); Guggenheim Abu Dhabi; Princeton University Art Museum; The Jewish Museum, New York; MAMBO – Museum of Modern Art, Bogotá; The New York Public Library; Rose Art Museum; and FRAC Marseille.

== Publications ==
Guez’s work has been the subject of monographs and publications released by publishers including Kerber Verlag, DISTANZ, New England Press, and the A. M. Qattan Foundation.
