= Iota Sigma Pi =

American honor society for women

- ΙΣΠ
- Founded: 1900; 126 years ago University of California
- Type: Honor
- Former affiliation: PPA; ACHS
- Status: Active
- Emphasis: Women in chemistry
- Scope: National
- Colors: White, Gold, and Cedar green
- Flower: White narcissus
- Publication: The Iotan
- Chapters: 15 active, 47 installed
- Members: 11,000+ lifetime
- Headquarters: c/o Margaret Workman; DePaul University; 1110 W. Belden Ave. Room 203; Chicago, Illinois 60614; United States
- Website: www.iotasigmapi.org

Iota Sigma Pi (ΙΣΠ) is a national honor society in the United States. It was established in 1900 and specializes in the promotion of women in the sciences, especially chemistry. It also focuses on personal and professional growth for women in these fields. As with all honor societies, they create professional networks along with recognizing achievements of women in chemistry.

== History ==
Iota Sigma Pi was formed during a period when women gained little recognition for their work; therefore, women began to set up their own awards to highlight their abilities on their resumes. It was created by the merger of three chemistry honor societies for women that were established in the early 20th century.

Agnes Fay Morgan, department chair of the Department of Household Science and Arts at the University of California, formed Alchemi in 1900. Alchemi spread to the University of Southern California and Stanford University. In 1911, a national chemistry honor society was established at the University of Washington. A third honor society, Iota Sigma Pi, was established at the University of Nebraska in 1912. The latter two societies merged as Iota Sigma Pi in 1913 and were joined by the three chapters of Alchmi in 1916. Its first National Convention was held in 1918 at the University of Nebraska. Five of the eight chapters at that time were present.

The goals of Iota Sigma Pi were to encourage women to pursue chemistry academically, to "stimulate personal accomplishment in chemical fields" and to promote the academic, business, and social lives of its members. It continued to spread across the country, and eventually held meetings for the American Chemical Society.

Iota Sigma Pi was a charter member of the Professional Panhellenic Association in 1925. In the 1930s, there was an offer of amalgamation from the Phi Lambda Upsilon honor society for male chemists but this was refused.

Iota Sigma Pi was briefly a member of the Association of College Honor Societies or ACHS, joining in February 1955, but resigned to operate independently in 1963. In 1963, it had 19 active chapters, 8 inactive chapters, and 6,271 initiates.

As of 2025, Iota Sigma Pi has chartered 47 chapters and initiated more than 11,000 members. Its national headquarters is based at De Paul University in Chicago, Illinois.

== Symbols ==
Iota Sigma Pi's emblem is a hexagonal key that features a crescent a circle, and the Greek letters ΙΣΠ. The society's colors are white, gold, and cedar green. Its flower is the white narcissus. Its publication is The Iotan, first published in 1941.

== Chapters ==
As of 2025, Iota Sigma Pi has chartered 47 chapters.

== Awards ==
=== Professional awards ===
The highest award from the society is the National Honorary Member which is given to female chemists who have made an exceptional and significant achievement in the field. The certificate is awarded with a prize fund of $1,500. Some of the previous winners include: Marie Sklodowska-Curie, Gerti Corfi and Dorothy Hodgkin.

The Violet Diller Professional Excellence Award, named after a previous member (treasurer and president), is awarded for "accomplishments in academic, governmental, or industrial chemistry, in education, in administration, or a combination of these areas". The award consists of a certificate and a $1,000 prize fund. This award was first awarded to Joan P. Lambros in 1984.

The Agnes Fay Morgan Research Award is given to women who have achieved in the field of chemistry or biochemistry. The Centennial Award for Excellence in Undergraduate Teaching is given to those who have excelled in teaching chemistry, biochemistry, or a similar subject. The nominee must spend at least 75 percent of their time teaching undergraduates to qualify for the certificate and $500 award.

=== Student awards ===
The Anna Louise Hoffman Award for Outstanding Achievement in Graduate Research is given to the nominee who has demonstrated outstanding chemical research. The nominee must also be a full-time graduate student to get the certification and $500 reward. There are two awards for Undergraduate Excellence in Chemistry; one must go to a first-generation student. Again, the reward is a certificate and $500.

== Notable members ==
As of 2025, Iota Sigma Pi has initiated more than 11,000 members.

== See also ==
- Honor society
- List of chemistry societies
- Professional Fraternity Association
