= List of Iota Sigma Pi members =

Iota Sigma Pi is an American honor society for women in the sciences, especially chemistry. It was created by the merger of three chemistry honor societies for women that were established in the early 20th century. Following are some of the society's notable members.

== Notable members ==
Name	Chapter	Notability	Ref.
Carolyn Bertozzi		chemist and winner of the 2022 Nobel Prize in Chemistry	
Emmanuelle Charpentier		microbiologist, biochemist, and co-winner of the 2020 Nobel Prize in Chemistry	
Lillian Cohen		inorganic chemist	
Zada Mary Cooper		pharmacist and professor at the University of Iowa	
Jennifer Doudna		chemist and co-winner of the 2020 Nobel Prize in Chemistry	
Kathryn Ferguson Fink		biochemist	
Ruby Hirose	Cincinnati	biochemist and bacteriologist	
Allene Jeanes		chemical researcher	
Joan Priscilla Kilbourn		microbiologist and educator	
Nell I. Mondy	University of Texas at Austin	biochemist	
Jin Kim Montclare		biomolecular engineer	
Agnes Fay Morgan	Hydrogen	chair of the home economics program at the University of California	
Nina Roscher	Purdue	chemist	
Glenola Rose		chemist	
Diane Grob Schmidt	Radium	chemist	
Dorothy Martin Simon		physical chemist	
Paola S. Timiras		endocrinologist	
Hoylande Young		chemist	

== Honorary members ==
The highest award from Iota Sigma Pi is the National Honorary Member which is given to female chemists who have made an exceptional and significant achievement in the field.

Name	Year	Notability	Ref.
Frances Arnold	2020	chemical engineer and winner of the 2018 Nobel Prize in Chemistry	
Bridgette Barry	1999	biophysicist and biochemist	
Ruth R. Benerito	1975	scientist and inventor	
Jeanette Grasselli Brown	1987	chemist	
Emma P. Carr	1945	chair of the chemistry department at Mount Holyoke College	
Mildred Cohn	1988	biochemist	
Gerty Cori	1949	biochemist and winner of the 1947 Nobel Prize in Physiology or Medicine	
Marie Curie	1921	physicist and chemist who conducted pioneering research on radioactivity, co-winner of the 1903 Nobel Prize in Physics, and winner of the 1911 Nobel Prize in Chemistry	
Helen Dyer	1972	biochemist	
Gladys Anderson Emerson	1966	historian, biochemist, and nutritionist	
Barbara J. Finlayson-Pitts	2017	atmospheric chemist	
Edith M. Flanigen	1986	chemist	
Rosalind Franklin	1982	x-ray crystallographer	
Helen Murray Free	1978	chemist and educator	
Ellen Gleditsch	1929	radiochemist	
Mary L. Good	1983	inorganic chemist	
Vicki Grassian	2020	chemist	
Icie Hoobler	1949	biochemist	
Dorothy Hodgkin	1966	chemist and 1964 winner of the Nobel Prize in Chemistry	
Darleane C. Hoffman	1933	nuclear chemist	
Marjorie G. Horning	1985	biochemist and pharmacologist	
Susan M. Kauzlarich	2011	chemist	
Ines Mandl	1979	biochemist	
Janet G. Osteryoung	1990	chemist	
Mary Engle Pennington	1940	bacteriological chemist and refrigeration engineer	
Gertrude Perlmann	1969	biochemist and structural biologist	
Florence R. Sabin	1935	medical scientist	
Florence B. Seibert	1942	biochemist	
Jean'ne Shreeve	1984	chemist	
Betty Sullivan	1972	biochemist	
Patricia Thiel	2008	surface chemist	
Lidia Vallarino	1996	inorganic chemist who was chemistry lecturer at the University of Milan	
Elizabeth Weisburger	1981	chemist	
Angela K. Wilson	2023	professor in the Department of Chemistry of Michigan State University	

== See also ==
- List of Iota Sigma Pi chapters
