= Garvan–Olin Medal =

Award for women in chemistry

Francis P. Garvan–John M. Olin Medal
- Awarded for: Given annually "to recognize distinguished scientific accomplishment, leadership and service to chemistry by women chemists."
- Date: 1937
- Country: United States
- Presented by: American Chemical Society
- Reward: $5,000
- Website: http://www.acs.org/content/acs/en/funding-and-awards/awards/national/bytopic/francis-p-garvan-john-m-olin-medal.html

The Francis P. Garvan–John M. Olin Medal, previously called the Francis P. Garvan Medal, is an annual award that recognizes distinguished scientific accomplishment, leadership and service to chemistry by women chemists. The Award is offered by the American Chemical Society (ACS), and consists of a cash prize (US$5,000) and a medal. The medal was designed by Margaret Christian Grigor.

== Background ==
Any individual may nominate a single eligible chemist in one year. Nominees must be a female citizen of the United States.

The award was established by Francis Garvan and Mabel Brady Garvan in 1936 in honor of their daughter. It was initially an essay contest, that ran for seven years, as a memorial to their daughter (the American Chemical Society's Prize Essay Contest). It was solely funded by the Francis P. Garvan Medal Endowment from its establishment in 1936 until 1979. W. R. Grace & Co. assumed co-sponsorship of the award from 1979 to 1983. In 1984, Olin Corporation assumed co-sponsorship. Mabel Brady Garvan remained involved with the Award through 1967.

The Garvan–Olin Award is the ACS' third-oldest award, and the first award established to honor women chemists.

== Award recipients ==
- 1937 Emma P. Carr
- 1940 Mary Engle Pennington
- 1942 Florence B. Seibert
- 1946 Icie Macy Hoobler
- 1947 Mary Lura Sherrill
- 1948 Gerty Cori
- 1949 Agnes Fay Morgan
- 1950 Pauline Beery Mack
- 1951 Katharine B. Blodgett
- 1952 Gladys A. Emerson
- 1953 Leonora N. Bilger
- 1954 Betty Sullivan
- 1955 Grace Medes
- 1956 Allene R. Jeanes
- 1957 Lucy W. Pickett
- 1958 Arda A. Green
- 1959 Dorothy Virginia Nightingale
- 1960 Mary L. Caldwell
- 1961 Sarah Ratner
- 1962 Helen M. Dyer
- 1963 Mildred Cohn
- 1964 Birgit Vennesland
- 1965 Gertrude Perlmann
- 1966 Mary L. Peterman
- 1967 Marjorie J. Vold
- 1968 Gertrude B. Elion
- 1969 Sofia Simmonds
- 1970 Ruth R. Benerito
- 1971 Mary Fieser
- 1972 Jean'ne M. Shreeve
- 1973 Mary L. Good
- 1974 Joyce J. Kaufman
- 1975 Marjorie C. Caserio
- 1976 Isabella L. Karle
- 1977 Marjorie G. Horning
- 1978 Madeleine M. Joullié
- 1979 Jenny P. Glusker
- 1980 Helen M. Free
- 1981 Elizabeth K. Weisburger
- 1982 Sara Jane Rhoads
- 1983 Ines Mandl
- 1984 Martha L. Ludwig
- 1985 Catherine Clarke Fenselau
- 1986 Jeanette G. Grasselli
- 1987 Janet G. Osteryoung
- 1988 Marye Anne Fox
- 1989 Kathleen C. Taylor
- 1990 Darleane C. Hoffman
- 1991 Cynthia M. Friend
- 1992 Jacqueline K. Barton
- 1993 Edith M. Flanigen
- 1994 Barbara J. Garrison
- 1995 Angelica Stacy
- 1996 Geraldine L. Richmond
- 1997 Karen W. Morse
- 1998 Joanna S. Fowler
- 1999 Cynthia A. Maryanoff
- 2000 F. Ann Walker
- 2001 Susan S. Taylor
- 2002 Marion C. Thurnauer
- 2003 Martha Greenblatt
- 2004 Sandra C. Greer
- 2005 Frances H. Arnold
- 2006 Lila M. Gierasch
- 2007 Laura L. Kiessling
- 2008 Elizabeth C. Theil
- 2009 Kathlyn A. Parker
- 2010 Judith Giordan
- 2011 Sherry J. Yennello
- 2012 Sue B. Clark
- 2013 Susan M. Kauzlarich
- 2014 Marsha I. Lester
- 2015 Angela K. Wilson
- 2016 Annie B. Kersting
- 2017 Barbara J. Finlayson-Pitts
- 2018 Valerie J. Kuck
- 2019 Lisa McElwee-White
- 2020 Caroline Chick Jarrold
- 2021 Carol J. Burns
- 2022 Anne McCoy
- 2023 Jeanne E. Pemberton
- 2024 Donna M. Huryn
- 2025 Jean Chmielewski
- 2026 Ah-Hyung Park

== See also ==
- List of chemistry awards
- List of science and technology awards for women
