= Carol Burns (disambiguation) =

Carol Burns may refer to:

- Carol Burns (Australian actress)
- Carol J. Burns (American chemist)
