= Angelica Stacy =

Professor at the university of California

- Education: LaSalle College, Cornell University, Northwestern University
- Known for: Solid State Chemistry, Physical Chemistry, Inorganic Chemistry
- Awards: Garvan-Olin Medal
- Scientific career
- Fields: Chemistry
- Workplaces: University of California, Berkeley
- Doctoral advisor: Michell J. Sienko
- Notable students: Amy Prieto

Angelica M. Stacy is the associate vice provost for the faculty, and professor of chemistry, at University of California, Berkeley. Stacy was one of the first women to receive tenure in the college of chemistry at UC Berkeley.

At UC Berkeley, Stacy leads a research group that explores topics in materials science and chemistry education. Stacy has won numerous awards for her contributions to chemistry education research and has advocated for increased diversity in the field and STEM more generally.

== Research, career, and service ==
Stacy received a B.A. in physics and chemistry magna cum laude at LaSalle College (1977). Stacy would then go on to receive her Ph.D. from Cornell University (1981) with Professor Michell J Sienko. She was a postdoctoral fellow at Northwestern University (1981–1983) with Professor Richard van Duyne and Professor Peter Stair prior to beginning her faculty position in the college of chemistry at the University of California, Berkeley. As a junior faculty member at Berkeley, Stacy was the first recipient of the Prytanean Faculty Award, which is an unrestricted grant awarded to distinguished female faculty members at UC Berkeley.

In the area of service, and as a senior member of the faculty at the University of California, Stacy has been outspoken about her commitment to issues surrounding diversity and equity in the sciences. Stacy has served as co-investigator and principal investigator of the University of California Faculty Family-Friendly Edge, which is a Sloan Foundation research project based at UC Berkeley. In these roles and that of associate vice provost of the faculty at the University of California, Berkeley, Stacy is particularly committed to promoting "data-driven initiatives to increase equity and inclusion in faculty recruitment, advancement, and retention".

In addition to her research in the area of chemistry education at the university level, Stacy has been outspoken on the importance of exposure to chemistry research (and research in the sciences more generally) at the high school level to help promote interest in career pathways in basic research, as a pathway to improve diversity in the field, and as a strategy to enhance student learning outcomes. She has spoken on the importance of high school educators as key to these endeavors:

"I have to come to the defense of my high school colleagues. Nothing is going to change until we respect them as professionals. They have a lot to offer. They have many ideas, but no time. They are in contact with students every hour of the day. There are no longer in-service days or professional days in many states. High school teachers know what they would like to do, but they have no time to do it. Yet we treat them as if we need to go and help them. In fact, I think we have much to learn from them. Until we come to the table with our high school colleagues, acknowledging them as the high-level professionals that they are, things are not going to change."

Stacy is also the author of the book Living by Chemistry, a research-based curriculum for students at the high school level.

== Awards ==
Stacy has been recognized for her contributions to chemistry education through numerous awards at the national and local level:

- Garvan-Olin Medal, American Chemical Society 1995
- Distinguished Teaching Scholar, National Science Foundation (2005)
- James Flack Norris Award for Outstanding Achievement in Teaching Chemistry, American Chemical Society (1998)
- President's Chair for Teaching, University of California (1993-1996)
- Award for Professional Excellence, Iota Sigma Pi Society (1996)
- Noyce Prize for Excellence in Undergraduate Teaching (Chemistry), University of California, Berkeley (1996)
- Catalyst Award, Chemical Manufacturers Association (1995)
- Francis P. Garvan-John M. Olin Medal, American Chemical Society (1994)
- Technology Transfer Certificate of Merit, Lawrence Berkeley National Laboratory (1991)
- Faculty Award for Women Scientists and Engineers, National Science Foundation (1991)
- Berkeley Distinguished Teaching Award, University of California, Berkeley (1991)
- Sloan Foundation Fellowship (1988-1990)
- Teacher-Scholar Award, Camille and Henry Dreyfus Foundation (1988)
- ExxonMobil Award Faculty Fellowship for Solid State Chemistry, American Chemical Society (1987)
- Prytanean Society Faculty Enrichment Award, University of California, Berkeley (1986)
- Presidential Young Investigator, National Science Foundation (1984-1989)

== Select publications ==
Prior to her independent academic career:

- Schneemeyer, Lynn F.; Stacy, Angelica; Sienko, M. J. (1980-09-01). "Effect of nonstoichiometry on the periodic lattice distortion in vanadium diselenide". Inorganic Chemistry. 19 (9): 2659–2662. doi:10.1021/ic50211a036. ISSN 0020-1669.
- Schneemeyer, Lynn F.; Wrighton, Mark S.; Stacy, Angelica; Sienko, Michell J. (1980-04-15). "n‐type molybdenum‐diselenide‐based liquid‐junction solar cells: A nonaqueous electrolyte system employing the chlorine/chloride couple". Applied Physics Letters. 36 (8): 701–703. Bibcode:1980ApPhL..36..701S. doi:10.1063/1.91598. ISSN 0003-6951.
- Landers, J. Steven; Dye, James L.; Stacy, Angelica; Sienko, M. J. (1981-04-01). "Temperature-dependent electron spin interactions in lithium [2.1.1] cryptate electride powders and films". The Journal of Physical Chemistry. 85 (9): 1096–1099. doi:10.1021/j150609a004. ISSN 0022-3654.

In the area of chemistry education:

- Scalise, Kathleen; Douskey, Michelle; Stacy, Angelica (2018-01-01). "Measuring learning gains and examining implications for student success in STEM". Higher Education Pedagogies. 3 (1): 183–195. doi:10.1080/23752696.2018.1425096.
- Sinapuelas, Michelle L. S.; Stacy, Angelica M. (2015). "The relationship between student success in introductory university chemistry and approaches to learning outside of the classroom". Journal of Research in Science Teaching. 52 (6): 790–815. Bibcode:2015JRScT..52..790S. doi:10.1002/tea.21215. ISSN 1098-2736.
- Claesgens, Jennifer; Scalise, Kathleen; Wilson, Mark; Stacy, Angelica (2009). "Mapping student understanding in chemistry: The Perspectives of Chemists". Science Education. 93 (1): 56–85. Bibcode:2009SciEd..93...56C. doi:10.1002/sce.20292. ISSN 1098-237X.
- Teichert, Melonie A.; Stacy, Angelica M. (2002). "Promoting understanding of chemical bonding and spontaneity through student explanation and integration of ideas". Journal of Research in Science Teaching. 39 (6): 464–496. Bibcode:2002JRScT..39..464T. doi:10.1002/tea.10033. ISSN 1098-2736.
- Kegley, Susan E.; Stacy, Angelica M. (1993-02-01). "Environmental Chemistry in the Freshman Laboratory". Journal of Chemical Education. 70 (2): 151. Bibcode:1993JChEd..70..151K. doi:10.1021/ed070p151.2. ISSN 0021-9584.
