= Dorothy Virginia Nightingale =

American organic chemist (1902-2000)

- Born: February 21, 1902
- Died: June 12, 2000 (aged 98)
- Awards: Garvan–Olin Medal (1959)
- Scientific career
- Fields: Chemistry

Dorothy Virginia Nightingale (February 21, 1902 – June 12, 2000) was an American organic chemist who is known for research on chemiluminescence and the Friedel-Crafts reaction. Nightingale directed the research of 24 PhD students and 26 Masters students and authored 56 scientific publications.

== Personal life ==
Nightingale was born and raised in Colorado, until, at age seventeen, the family moved to Columbia, Missouri. Nightingale's mother, Jennie Beem, was a teacher and secretary prior to marrying the rancher William David Nightingale. Nightingale never married however her student became like her extended family. After retirement she moved back to Colorado where she was born, to live the remaining of her life in a retirement community called Frasier Meadows. She found enjoyment in mountain climbing and taking pictures of wildflower fields. Nightingale also loved to travel.

== Education ==
Nightingale's mother awakened her daughter's interest in chemistry. A group of students took young Nightingale on a field trip and demonstrated a number of chemistry experiments at Colorado State University. Nightingale was forever enlighten by the experience. Nightingale pursued a chemistry degree at the University of Missouri. In Fact, at the age of seventeen Nightingale began her post secondary education working as a grader in the German language department. She had her mind set on becoming a high school language teacher. However, Herman Schlundt a college chemistry professor at the university of Missouri was a supportive figure in Nightingale’s future and he convinced her to attend graduate school so she could accomplish her dream of becoming a teacher but at the college level. Nightingale also obtained a master's degree at the University of Missouri . Her final thesis was based on the organomagnesium halides and luminescent compounds., but went to the University of Chicago for a PhD in chemistry, awarded in 1928. Nightingale gale doctoral thesis focused on studies in the Merexide and Alloxantine series. Nightengale was a member of the Honors society during her time at the University of Chicago.

== Career ==
Nightingale joined the staff at the University of Missouri as an instructor in 1923 (one of only two female chemistry instructors) and returned there after earning a PhD. Nightingale published 56 papers while directing the research of 24 PhD students and 26 Masters students. Nightingale's research focused on chemiluminescence, the mechanism of the Friedel-Crafts reaction, the reactions of nitroparaffins with alicyclic ketones, and the reactions of azadispiroketones. This work had a significant impact on the development of production methods for various chemicals that involve dangerous reactions such as high-octane gasoline, synthetic rubbers and plastics, and detergents.

Nightingale spent a sabbatical leave during 1938 at the University of Minnesota, adapting their course content and advanced research equipment in an effort to improve Missouri's organic chemistry program.

Furthermore, Nightingale dedicated a great deal of her time to government research projects during her career. During World War II, Nightingale and colleagues H.E. French and H. E. Ungnade served as investigators for the United States’ Committee on Medical Research in the Office of Scientific Research and Development in a search for new antimalarials. The group prepared a number of alpha-(dialkylaminoalkyl) acenaphthenemethanols and analogous isoquinolines, but none were more effective than those already in use. Over the years she continued to advanced throughout Missouri University's chemistry department from instructor, to assistant professor, and in 1958 she finally became a professor. In 1959, Nightingale was awarded the Garvan Medal, given by the American Chemical Society, for distinguished service to chemistry. In 1972 Nightingale stopped teaching and served as a member of the Emeritus committee until 1975

In addition, Nightingale published the book titled A History of the Department of Chemistry' University of Missouri-Columbia, 1843-1975. Before she retired Nightingale became the director of graduate studies at the University of Missouri. Moreover, Nightingale gale started to analyze the statistics of woman’s advancement in the science educational field. She was concerned about the lack of opportunities being to offered to woman to help further their advancement in the educational science field. She used herself as a case study because compared to the average males during that time period . it took Nightingale double the time to become a professor 30 years instead of the usual 15. Furthermore, throughout Nightingale's professional career she gained memberships to several prestigious honors groups. Nightingale was not only a member of the American Chemical Society but she was the vice president and treasurer of the Missouri's Chemical Society division. Also she served as the local vice president for Phi Beta and local president for the Sigma Delta Epsilon.
