= F. Ann Walker =

American chemist (died 2022)

- Died: January 30, 2022
- Education: Brown University
- Scientific career
- Workplaces: University of Arizona
- Thesis: Thermodynamic and ESR Studies of Coordination to the Sixth Position of Vanadyl Acetylacetonate (1966)

Frances Ann Walker was an American chemist known for her work on heme protein chemistry. She was an elected fellow of the American Association for the Advancement of Science and the American Chemical Society.

== Education and career ==
Walker was born in Ohio and grew up there, graduating from Adena High School in 1958. Walker has a B.A. in chemistry from College of Wooster (1962). In 1966 she earned her Ph.D. in chemistry from Brown University. From 1967 until 1970 she was a postdoctoral fellow at the University of California, Los Angeles, and an assistant professor at Ithaca College. She then moved to San Francisco State University, where she was promoted to professor in 1976. Subsequently, she moved to the University of Arizona, where she was named regents professor in 2001, and then she retired in 2013.

During her course of her career, Walker worked at variety of educational institutions, where she was responsible for conducting and teaching chemistry classes. She made a significant contribution to the development of the inorganic and bioinorganic chemistry research programs at the University of Arizona though her work there. Further, she was responsible for supervising postdoctoral research as well as graduate students, there by contributing to the development of the next generation of scientist working field.

== Research ==
Walker's research centered on bio-inorganic chemistry, especially heme protein chemistry. Walker examined proteins in bloodsucking insects and cytochromes that transfer energy between cells. Walker's early work was on porphyrins and their complexation with iron. She was able to obtain structural information about metal-binding proteins. A portion of her work relied on nuclear magnetic resonance, especially paramagnetic nuclear magnetic resonance spectroscopy, which she used to examine model heme and systems with proteins coupled to heme.

Walker's research also helped people understand better how spectroscopic techniques can be used to study complicated biological systems. By combining experimental data with in-depth chemical analysis, she helped show how techniques like electron paramagnetic resonance and nuclear magnetic resonance spectroscopy could show important details about how metalloproteins work and how they made. Her work helped make these methods useful for studying metal-based biological chemistry.

== Awards and honors ==
Walker was elected a fellow of the American Association for the Advancement of Science in 1984. In 2000 she received the Garvan–Olin Medal for scientific accomplishments by a woman chemist from the American Chemical Society. In 2006 she received the Alfred Bader Award in Bioinorganic Chemistry, and in 2011 she was elected a fellow of the American Chemical Society. The Society of Porphyrins and Phthalocyanines awarded her the Eraldo Antonini Award for lifetime achievement award in 2020.

== Selected publications ==
- Walker, Frances Ann (1970). "Electron spin resonance study of coordination to the fifth and sixth positions of .alpha.,.beta.,.gamma.,.delta.-tetra(p-methoxyphenyl)porphinatocobalt(II)". Journal of the American Chemical Society. 92 (14): 4235–4244. doi:10.1021/ja00717a018. ISSN 0002-7863.
- Walker, F. Ann; Lo, Man-Wai; Ree, Molly T. (1976). "Electronic effects in transition metal porphyrins. The reactions of imidazoles and pyridines with a series of para-substituted tetraphenylporphyrin complexes of chloroiron(III)". Journal of the American Chemical Society. 98 (18): 5552–5560. doi:10.1021/ja00434a024. ISSN 0002-7863. PMID 956570.
- Walker, F. Ann; Boi Hanh, Huynh; Scheidt, W. Robert; Osvath, Sarah R. (1 August 1986). "Models of the cytochromes b. Effect of axial ligand plane orientation on the EPR and Moessbauer spectra of low-spin ferrihemes". Journal of the American Chemical Society. 108 (17): 5288–5297. doi:10.1021/ja00277a038. ISSN 0002-7863.
- Ribeiro, José M. C.; Hazzard, Jo M. H.; Nussenzveig, Roberto H.; Champagne, Donald E.; Walker, F. Ann (23 April 1993). "Reversible Binding of Nitric Oxide by a Salivary Heme Protein from a Bloodsucking Insect". Science. 260 (5107): 539–541. Bibcode:1993Sci...260..539R. doi:10.1126/science.8386393. ISSN 0036-8075. PMID 8386393.
- Walker, F. Ann (1 May 1999). "Magnetic spectroscopic (EPR, ESEEM, Mössbauer, MCD and NMR) studies of low-spin ferriheme centers and their corresponding heme proteins". Coordination Chemistry Reviews. 185–186: 471–534. doi:10.1016/S0010-8545(99)00029-6. ISSN 0010-8545.
- Walker, F. Ann (1 February 2004). "Models of the Bis-Histidine-Ligated Electron-Transferring Cytochromes. Comparative Geometric and Electronic Structure of Low-Spin Ferro- and Ferrihemes". Chemical Reviews. 104 (2): 589–616. doi:10.1021/cr020634j. ISSN 0009-2665. PMID 14871136.
