= Leonora Bilger =

American chemist who studied nitrogenous compounds

- Born: February 3, 1893; Boston, Massachusetts
- Died: February 19, 1975 (aged 82)
- Citizenship: United States
- Education: University of Cincinnati
- Known for: studies of nitrogenous compounds
- Spouse: Earl M. Bilger
- Awards: Garvan–Olin Medal (1953)
- Scientific career
- Fields: chemistry
- Workplaces: Sweet Briar College, University of Cincinnati, Cambridge University, University of Hawaii
- Thesis: (1916)

Leonora Bilger (3 February 1893 – 19 February 1975, née Neuffer) was an American chemist who studied nitrogenous compounds. She was a noted teacher and administrator at the University of Hawaii for the majority of her career.

== Life ==
Bilger was born Leonora Neuffer on 3 February 1893, in Boston, Massachusetts. Her father was George Neuffer and her mother was Elizabeth Neuffer. When she was about 7, her family moved to Cincinnati, Ohio, where Bilger (then Neuffer) attended elementary and secondary schools. Before 1929, she married Earl M. Bilger, a professor at the University of Cincinnati. She died on 19 February 1975, 82 years old.

== Education ==
Bilger matriculated at the University of Cincinnati in 1909 and earned her Bachelor of Arts degree in chemistry in 1913, as well as her master's degree in 1914. In 1916, Bilger received her Ph.D. in chemistry from the University of Cincinnati, where she would later work.

== Scientific career ==
Shortly after receiving her Ph.D., Bilger became the head of Sweet Briar College's department of chemistry, a position she held for two years. In 1919, she returned to her alma mater's department of chemistry, where she stayed for 10 years. Bilger spent a year from 1924–25 at Newnham College Cambridge University as a Sarah Berliner Fellow. After her stint at the University of Cincinnati, Bilger and her husband moved to the University of Hawaii's department of chemistry, where she would stay the rest of her professional career. She was promoted to the department head in 1943 and held that position for 11 years; in 1953 she became a Senior Professor there. In 1960, she retired and became a professor emerita at the university until 1964, when she retired fully. During her time at the University of Hawaii, she designed their new chemistry laboratory. Completed in 1951, the 70,000 square-foot facility cost $1.5 million and was named after the Bilgers in 1959.

Bilger's studies of nitrogenous compounds began with her thesis work, which concerned hydroxylamines and hydroxamic acids. When she returned to the University of Cincinnati's chemistry department, she was tasked with directing its research. She herself studied asymmetric nitrogenous chemicals during this time. Bilger continued this research at the University of Hawaii, however, she allocated more time to teaching and administrative duties. Her later research concerned the toxicity of cancer-fighting chemicals. She also examined the sterols found in tropical oils, and pigments in red peppers.

=== Honors ===
In 1953, Bilger was the recipient of the Garvan-Olin Medal, awarded by the American Chemical Society. She earned this honor for her work with asymmetric nitrogen compounds. The medal, first given in 1936, is awarded to women who have made significant contributions to the field of chemistry. She was a member of the AAAS and the New York Academy of Sciences.
