= Sherry Yennello =

American physicist

Sherry J. Yennello is an American nuclear chemist / nuclear physicist and an Elected Fellow of the American Association for the Advancement of Science. She is a Regents Professor and the holder of the Cyclotron Institute Bright Chair in Nuclear Science, who currently serves as the director of the Cyclotron Institute at Texas A&M University. She is also a Fellow of the American Chemical Society and the American Physical Society. She has authored as well as co-authored more than 530 peer-reviewed journal articles and has conducted many invited talks, presentations and seminars at several prestigious academic conferences and scholarly lectures.

== Education ==
Yennello received a Bachelor of Science in chemistry from Rensselaer Polytechnic Institute in 1985, following which she also received a Bachelor of Science in physics in 1986. She continued her education with her Doctor of Philosophy studies in Nuclear Chemistry at Indiana University Bloomington, where she also worked as an associate instructor. She completed her doctoral studies in 1990, and began her career as a postdoctoral research associate at the National Superconducting Cyclotron Laboratory (NSCL) at Michigan State University.

== Professional career ==
In 1993, she joined Texas A&M University, College Station as an assistant professor in the Department of Chemistry. Her significant contributions to research and academia during her tenure at Texas A&M, led her to serve as the Program Director for Nuclear Physics for the National Science Foundation, for a period of two years from 2000 to 2002. She was appointed as an associate dean for Diversity for the College of Science at Texas A&M University in 2004, following which she also served as the associate dean for Faculty Affairs (2008 - 2014) and associate dean for Strategic Initiatives (2016 - 2018) for the same. She was awarded the title of Regents' Professor by Texas A&M University in 2007. In 2014, she was named the director of the Cyclotron Institute, which is a U.S. Department of Energy University Facility at Texas A&M University, jointly supported by United States Department of Energy and the State of Texas. Over the years, she has supervised and been a research adviser to more than 80 students, including post-doctoral research fellows, graduate and undergraduate students.

== Research Interests ==
Dr. Yennello's research interests include accelerator based heavy-ion reactions to study the dynamics and thermodynamics of excited nuclear matter and elucidate the nuclear equation of state, particularly the density dependence of the symmetry term, which has implications for the formation of elements and other astrophysical processes. The Yennello Research Group focuses on further constraining this density dependence using heavy-ion collisions. Utilizing the K500 and K150 cyclotrons, heavy-ion projectiles are accelerated to up to 40% the speed of light and collided with stationary targets. These reactions are important for studying structure, chemical composition, and the evolution of neutron stars and dynamics of supernovae explosions.

== Awards ==
Dr. Yennello's contributions to the domain of nuclear physics and chemistry has been well acknowledged internationally, and she has been the recipient of several prestigious awards and honors over the span of her career. Some of the prominent awards received by her are listed below:

- GE Foundation Faculty for the Future Award, 1993
- Oak Ridge National Laboratory Associate Universities Junior Faculty Enhancement Award, 1993
- National Science Foundation Young Investigator Award, 1994
- Texas A&M University Center for Teaching Excellence Scholar, 1995
- Sigma Xi National Young Investigator Award, 2000
- University Faculty Fellow, 2000
- Women's Spirit Month Award, 2002
- Fellow, American Physical Society, Elected 2005
- Regents Professor, 2007
- Association of Former Students Distinguished Award for Teaching – College Level, 2008
- ACS Francis P. Garvan – John M. Olin Medal, 2010.
- Outstanding Mentoring Award, Women's Faculty Network, 2010
- Fellow, American Chemical Society, Elected 2011
- Association of Former Students Distinguished Award for Teaching – University Level, 2012
- Fellow, American Association for the Advancement of Science, Elected 2013
- Bright Chair in Nuclear Science, 2014
- American Physical Society Division of Nuclear Physics Mentoring Award, 2017
- Texas A&M University ACE Award, 2017
- Texas A&M College of Science LEAD Award, 2017
- American Chemical Society Glenn T. Seaborg Award for Nuclear Chemistry, 2021
- Southeastern Universities Research Association (SURA) Distinguished Scientist Award, 2023
- Aggie Women Network's Eminent Scholar Award, 2023
- University Distinguished Professor, 2023
