= Sandra C. Greer =

American chemist

Sandra Charlene Greer
- Born: Sandra Charlene Thomason; 1945 (age 80–81)
- Education: Furman University
- Awards: Garvan–Olin Medal, ACS Award for Encouraging Women into Careers in the Chemical Sciences
- Scientific career
- Fields: Chemistry
- Workplaces: Mills College, University of Maryland, College Park, NIST
- Website: www.mills.edu/academics/faculty/chem/sgreer/sgreer.php

Sandra Charlene Greer (born Sandra Charlene Thomason, 1945) is an American physical chemist who has held important academic and administrative positions at both the University of Maryland, College Park and Mills College. Her area of study is the thermodynamics of fluids, especially polymer solutions and phase transitions. She has received awards for her scientific contributions, and for her advocacy for women in science and her work on ethics in science.

== Education ==
Sandra C. Greer studied chemistry and mathematics at Furman University in Greenville, South Carolina, receiving her Bachelor of Science degree in 1966. She then went to the University of Chicago where she received her master's degree in 1968 and her Ph.D. in 1969 in chemical physics.

== Career ==
In 1969 Greer joined the National Institute of Standards and Technology (NIST) in Gaithersburg, Maryland, where she worked the Heat Division until 1978. Greer helped to found NIST's Standards Committee for Women (SCW) and advocated for equitable treatment of women at NIST.

In 1978 she joined the University of Maryland, College Park, where she was the first woman to be hired on a regular research track in the department of chemistry and biochemistry. She was promoted to full professor in 1983. From 1987 to 1988 she chaired the President's Committee on Undergraduate Education, developing an extensive report, Making a Difference for Women. Also known as the Greer Report, it became the university's blueprint for the advancement of women. She held a number of administrative posts at Maryland, including serving as the first woman department chair of Chemistry and Biochemistry between 1990 and 1993.

In addition to being a professor in the department of chemistry and biochemistry, she became a professor in the Department of Chemical and Biomolecular Engineering in 1995, where she was the department's first tenured woman faculty member. She also developed a program of ethics courses for scientists, with the intention of teaching students "how to recognize an ethical dilemma when they see one, and how to think through it."

In 2008, Greer became provost and dean of the faculty at Mills College in Oakland, California, where she was also professor of chemistry and physics, and holder of the Scheffler Pre-Health Science Chair. She retired as provost and dean in 2013, and retired fully in 2015.

"The more we know, the more we must confront how much we do not know, and the more we are humbled by the ignorance of all of us together and of each of us individually. This resulting state of humility actually is a desirable state... because that state of mind makes us open to asking more questions and finding more answers." Sandra Greer, 2012

She has been committed throughout her career to ensuring that more women pursue a scientific career. At the national level, she helped to found the Committee for the Advancement of Women in the Chemical Sciences (COACh) in 1998. In 2014, she received the American Chemical Society's Award for Encouraging Women into Careers in the Chemical Sciences.

"We grieve for the unrealized potential of all these women, and we weep for all the science that did not get done because these women were excluded—the questions not asked, the experiments not done, the papers not written, the students not mentored." Sandra Greer, 2014

== Awards and honors ==
Greer is a member of the American Physical Society (1987), the American Chemical Society, the American Association for the Advancement of Science (1994), and the Association for Women in Science. She is a fellow of the American Physical Society (1986) and the American Academy of Arts and Sciences.

Greer has received numerous awards. In 2004, she received the Garvan–Olin Medal from the American Chemical Society, "for her contributions to the physical chemistry of critical phenomena in fluids and of reversible polymerizations in synthetic polymers" and for her advocacy and work on ethics.

She received the Award for Encouraging Women into Careers in the Chemical Sciences from the American Chemical Society in 2014.
