= Herbert McLean Evans =

American anatomist and embryologist

Herbert Evans ForMemRS
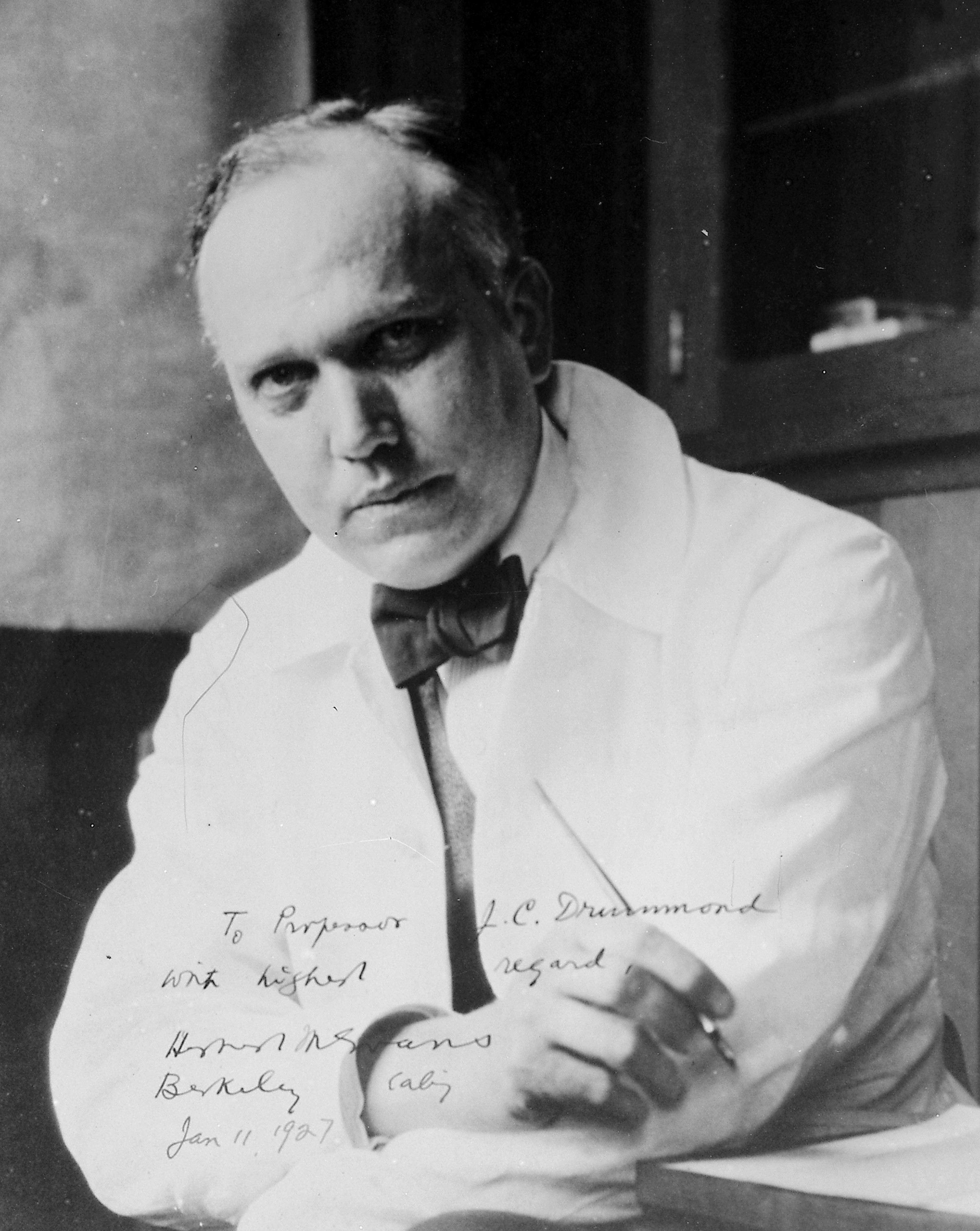
- Herbert McLean Evans in 1927
- Born: Herbert McLean Evans; September 23, 1882; Modesto, California, U.S.
- Died: March 6, 1971 (aged 88); Berkeley, California, U.S.
- Education: Johns Hopkins University, UC Berkeley
- Known for: Isolating human growth hormone, discovery of vitamin E
- Scientific career
- Fields: Anatomy, embryology
- Institutions: Johns Hopkins University, UC Berkeley
- Notable students: Miriam Elizabeth Simpson

Herbert McLean Evans (September 23, 1882 – March 6, 1971) was an American anatomist and embryologist best known for co-discovering Vitamin E.

== Education ==
He was born in Modesto, California. In 1908, he obtained his medical degree from Johns Hopkins University.

== Career ==
Evans became associate professor of anatomy at Johns Hopkins University. Evans moved back to California in 1915 and was made professor of anatomy at the University of California, Berkeley, and held that position until his death.

His medical research at Berkeley addressed problems relating to human nutrition, endocrinology, embryology, and histology. In 1918, his research into the number of human chromosomes led him to believe the number to be 48, when most people assumed the number to be much higher. It was only later discovered that the correct figure was 46. Evans had much greater success however with hormones extracted from the anterior lobe of the pituitary gland. He isolated Human Growth Hormone, which is essential for human growth and development. In 1922 along with Katharine Scott Bishop, during feeding experiments on rats, he co-discovered Vitamin E which is needed for human reproduction. He served as the 19th president of the Association of American Anatomists from 1930 to 1932. Evans became director of the Institute of Experimental Biology at Berkeley in 1931. With Gladys Anderson Emerson, he reported the isolation of the pure Vitamin E from wheat germ in 1937. He also determined the formula C_{29}H_{50}O_{2}. Evans was also instrumental in developing reproductive systems research with Miriam Elizabeth Simpson and Choh Hao Li, by studying the oestrus cycle of rats.

Evans is also credited with developing Evans blue, a method which determines blood volume in humans and animals.

Evans took a strong interest in the history of science and was an active collector of rare books in the field. His collection was later acquired by the Harry Ransom Center at the University of Texas at Austin.

He died in Berkeley, California, aged 88.

== Quotation ==
- "No single feature of man's past equals in importance his attempt to understand the forces of Nature and himself."

== Bibliography ==
- Evans, H. McLean (1904) A New Cestraciont Spine from the Lower Triassic of Idaho. The University Press: Berkeley, California.
- Evans, H. McLean and Scott, Katharine J. (1921) On the Differential Reaction to Vital Dyes Exhibited by the Two Groups of Connective-tissue Cells. Carnegie Institution of Washington.
- Long, Joseph A. and Evans, H. McLean (1922) The oestrous cycle in the rat and its associated phenomena. Univ. of California Press: Berkeley, California.
- Evans, H. McLean and Cole, Harold H. (1931) An Introduction to the Study of the Oestrous Cycle in the Dog. University of California Press: Berkeley, California.
- Evans, H. McLean and Swezy, Olive (1931) Ovogenesis and the Normal Follicular Cycle in Adult Mammalia. University of California Press: Berkeley, California.
- Evans, H. McLean and Becks, Hermann (1953) Atlas of the Skeletal Development of the Rat (Long-Evans strain): normal and hypophysectomized. American Institute of Dental Medicine: San Francisco.
- Evans, H. McLean, ed. (1959) Men and Moments in the History of Science. University of Washington Press: Seattle. ISBN 0-8371-2458-1
