= Lila Gierasch =

American biochemist and biophysicist (born 1948)

- Born: 1948 (age 77–78); Needham, Massachusetts

Academic background
- Education: Mount Holyoke College; Harvard University
- Doctoral advisor: Elkan R. Blout

Academic work
- Discipline: Biochemistry; Biophysics
- Institutions: University of Massachusetts Amherst
- Website: https://www.umass.edu/biochemistry-molecular-biology/faculty/lila-gierasch

Lila Mary Gierasch (born 1948 in Needham, Massachusetts) is an American biochemist and biophysicist. At present, she is a distinguished Professor working on "protein folding in the cell" in the Department of Biochemistry and Molecular Biology at the College of Natural Sciences, University of Massachusetts Amherst.

== Education and early career ==
Lila M. Gierasch, like her mother Marian Bookhout Gierasch, studied at Mount Holyoke College. She graduated in 1970 with a bachelor's degree in chemistry, and earned her doctorate in biophysics from Harvard University in 1975.

== Research and career ==
In 1974, Gierasch began teaching at Amherst College, where she worked as an assistant professor in chemistry. She worked under Jean-Marie Lehn at Université Louis Pasteur de Strasbourg between 1977 and 1978. In 1979 she went to University of Delaware for a position as an assistant professor, and was promoted to a professor in chemistry in 1985. In 1988 she moved to the University of Texas Southwestern Medical Center, where she worked as a professor in pharmacology and served as the Robert A. Welch Professor of Biochemistry. In 1994, Gierasch returned to Massachusetts to become a professor at the University of Massachusetts Amherst. She is currently a Distinguished Professor within the Department of Biochemistry and Molecular Biology. She served as the Editor In Chief, Journal of Biological Chemistry (JBC) from 2016 to 2021.

Gierasch's research has focused on the issue of protein folding. She has studied the relationship between amino acid sequences and protein structure, focusing in particular on how proteins fold in vivo. Her recent work has utilized computer modeling to analyze how the protein folding process occurs.

== Personal life ==
Gierasch met her husband John Pylant in Texas, and they were married in 1991.

== Honors and service ==
Gierasch was elected as a member of the American Academy of Arts and Sciences in 2016. In 2019, she was elected to the National Academy of Sciences.

Gierasch served as the editor-in-chief for the Journal of Biological Chemistry between 2016 and 2021.

== Awards ==
- 1984: Vincent du Vigneaud Award (American Peptide Society)
- 1985: Mary Lyon Award (Mount Holyoke College)
- 1986: Guggenheim Fellowship
- 1999: Chancellor's Medal (University of Massachusetts)
- 2006: Garvan–Olin Medal (American Chemical Society)
- 2006: Pioneer Award (National Institutes of Health)
- 2014: Mildred Cohn Award (American Society for Biochemistry and Molecular Biology)
- 2018: Ralph F. Hirschmann Award in Peptide Chemistry (American Chemical Society)
- 2019: R. Bruce Merrifield Award (American Peptide Society)
