= Sara Jane Rhoads =

American chemist

- Born: June 1, 1920; Kansas City, Missouri, USA
- Died: May 1, 1993 (aged 72); Laramie, Wyoming, USA
- Education: University of Chicago, Columbia University
- Awards: Garvan–Olin Medal (1982)
- Scientific career
- Fields: Chemistry
- Workplaces: University of Wyoming
- Doctoral advisor: William von Eggers Doering

Sara Jane Rhoads (June 1, 1920, Kansas City, Missouri – May 1, 1993, Laramie, Wyoming) was an American chemist. She was one of the first women in the United States to become a full professor of chemistry, helped to establish the chemistry department at the University of Wyoming, and was the recipient of the American Chemical Society's Garvan–Olin Medal in 1982.

== Life ==
Sara Jane Rhoads was born on June 1, 1920, in Kansas City, Missouri, to Errett Stanley Rhoads and Charlotte Rhoads, née Kraft. She was the youngest of six siblings.

Rhoads attended public school in Kansas City. She went to the University of Chicago, where she received her bachelor of science degree in chemistry in 1941.

Rhoads worked in the development department of the Lindsay Light and Chemical Company in Chicago between 1941 and 1943. She then taught at the Radford School for Girls in El Paso, Texas (1943-1944) and at Hollins College in Virginia (1944-1945).

Rhoads attended Columbia University in New York City as a PhD student, receiving her PhD in organic chemistry under William von Eggers Doering in 1949.

In September 1948 Sara Jane Rhoads moved to the University of Wyoming, where she worked until her retirement in 1984. In more than 35 years at the university, she devoted herself to teaching and to establishing the chemistry department. Between 1956 and 1957 she carried out postdoctoral research in Zurich, Switzerland, working with Vladimir Prelog, who would receive a Nobel Prize in 1975. In 1958, she was one of the first women to become a full professor of chemistry in the United States. She initiated the University of Wyoming's undergraduate research program, and served as the department's director from 1967-1968.

In 1959, Rhoads was the first person at the University of Wyoming to receive a grant from the National Science Foundation. She and Darleane Hoffman were the only two women, along with 161 men, who received a Senior Post Doctoral Fellowship from the National Science Foundation between 1956 and 1971. As of 1971 N. Rebecca Raulins was the only other woman chemist on the University of Wyoming faculty: nonetheless the university actually ranked higher than most American universities of the time in hiring women faculty.

Rhoads received the national Manufacturing Chemists' Association Award for Outstanding College Teaching in 1964, and the George Duke Humphrey Distinguished Faculty Award in 1974. She received the American Chemical Society's Garvan–Olin Medal in 1982. The university established the annual Sara Jane Rhoads & Rebecca Raulins Lecture in Organic Chemistry in 1992.

Rhoads' nephew Richard E. Smalley admired her and was inspired by her to pursue a career as a chemist. He worked in her laboratories in the 1960s. Smalley became a pioneer in the field of nanotechnology and received the 1996 Nobel Prize in Chemistry with Robert F. Curl and Harold Kroto for the discovery of fullerenes.

== Awards ==
- 1947–1948, American Association of University Women (AAUW) Fellowship
- 1956, NSF Senior Post Doctoral Fellowship, National Science Foundation
- 1964, Award for Outstanding College Teaching, Manufacturing Chemists' Association
- 1974, George Duke Humphrey Distinguished Faculty Award
- 1982, Garvan–Olin Medal, American Chemical Society
