= Amy Prieto =

American chemist

Amy Lucia Prieto
- Born: Bogotá, Colombia
- Education: Williams College, BA, 1996; University of California, Berkeley, PhD, 2001
- Awards: PECASE
- Scientific career
- Workplaces: Colorado State University, 2005 – Present; Harvard University, 2002 – 2005
- Thesis: Electrodeposition of Nanostructured Thermoelectric Materials (2001)
- Doctoral advisor: Angelica Stacy

Amy Prieto is a Professor of Chemistry at Colorado State University and the Founder and Chief Technology Officer of Prieto Battery.

== Education and early career ==
Prieto received her Bachelor of Arts degree in chemistry and philosophy from Williams College in 1996. There, she undertook an honors thesis entitled The Synthesis and Characterization of Precursors to Zirconium-Containing Liquid Crystals under the mentorship of Lee Young Park. Before beginning her doctoral work, she was a summer research fellow at Bell Labs, which she credits with fostering an appreciation for cross-disciplinary collaboration. She then attended the University of California, Berkeley, where she received her PhD in inorganic chemistry in 2001. For her graduate work, she worked in the laboratory of Angelica Stacy on her thesis entitled Electrodeposition of Nanostructured Thermoelectric Materials working to synthesize solid-state materials.

Following her PhD, she began a postdoctoral fellowship at Harvard University, working in the Nanoscale Science and Engineering Center in Hongkun Park's research group, where she studied and characterized the electronic properties of single molecules and nanoparticles.

== Research ==
In 2005, Prieto joined the faculty at Colorado State University as a synthetic chemist and materials scientist. Prieto's research program focuses on sodium-ion, and lithium-ion batteries, as well as developing nanoparticles and nanowire structures for a variety of applications.

== Prieto Battery ==
In 2009, she founded Prieto Battery. The company is geared towards developing and commercializing a rechargeable battery that will last longer, charge faster, and be free of toxic or flammable materials that make up traditional batteries. It took her four years to form the company and an additional five to develop a working prototype. By 2014, Prieto and collaborators had created a small pilot production line in her laboratory at CSU to demonstrate their viability to larger investors.

Unlike traditional batteries, Prieto's battery is solid-state, meaning the battery uses solid electrodes and a solid electrolyte, rather than liquid or polymer gel electrolytes. The battery makes use of a three-dimensional copper foam that undergoes a coating process through two electroplating steps: one to create a positively charged electrode (anode made of copper antimonide) and one to create the negatively-charged electrode (cathode). Because the foam is a porous 3-dimensional material, the electroplating coats both the foam's outer surface and its pores, creating a high surface area for ion transfer. The company claims that ions travel shorter distances than in conventional batteries, increasing power density (20C) and reducing charging times. This makes Prieto's battery charge faster and store more energy than lithium-ion batteries. The batteries are lightweight, flexible, use non-toxic materials, can come in a variety of shapes, and do not overheat or catch fire.

Investors in Prieto Battery include Stanley Ventures and Intel Capital. In 2016, Prieto demonstrated her batteries to Stanley Black & Decker, using one of their 3D printers.

== Awards and honors ==
- Fellow, Royal Society of Chemistry, 2017
- Presidential Early Career Award for Scientists and Engineers, 2012
- National Science Foundation CAREER Awards, 2010
- L'Oréal USA for Women in Science Fellowship, 2004
- Fellow, Sigma Xi, 1996
- Inorganic Nanoscience award by American Chemical Society in 2022

== Selected publications ==
- Riha, Shannon C.; Parkinson, Bruce A.; Prieto, Amy L. (2009-09-02). "Solution-Based Synthesis and Characterization of Cu 2 ZnSnS 4 Nanocrystals". Journal of the American Chemical Society. 131 (34): 12054–12055. doi:10.1021/ja9044168. ISSN 0002-7863. PMID 19673478.
- MS Sander, AL Prieto, R Gronsky, T Sands, AM Stacy (2002) Fabrication of High-Density, High Aspect Ratio, Large-Area Bismuth Telluride Nanowire Arrays by Electrodeposition into Porous Anodic Alumina Templates. Advanced Materials. 14 (9), 665–667.
- Prieto, Amy L.; Sander, Melissa S.; Martín-González, Marisol S.; Gronsky, Ronald; Sands, Timothy; Stacy, Angelica M. (2001-07-01). "Electrodeposition of Ordered Bi_{2}Te_{3} Nanowire Arrays". Journal of the American Chemical Society. 123 (29): 7160–7161. doi:10.1021/ja015989j. hdl:10261/31242. ISSN 0002-7863. PMID 11459497.
- Arthur, Timothy S.; Bates, Daniel J.; Cirigliano, Nicolas; Johnson, Derek C.; Malati, Peter; Mosby, James M.; Perre, Emilie; Rawls, Matthew T.; Prieto, Amy L.; Dunn, Bruce (2011-07-01). "Three-dimensional electrodes and battery architectures". MRS Bulletin. 36 (7): 523–531. doi:10.1557/mrs.2011.156. ISSN 1938-1425. S2CID 138283425.
