= Pauline Gracia Beery Mack =

American chemist (1891–1974)

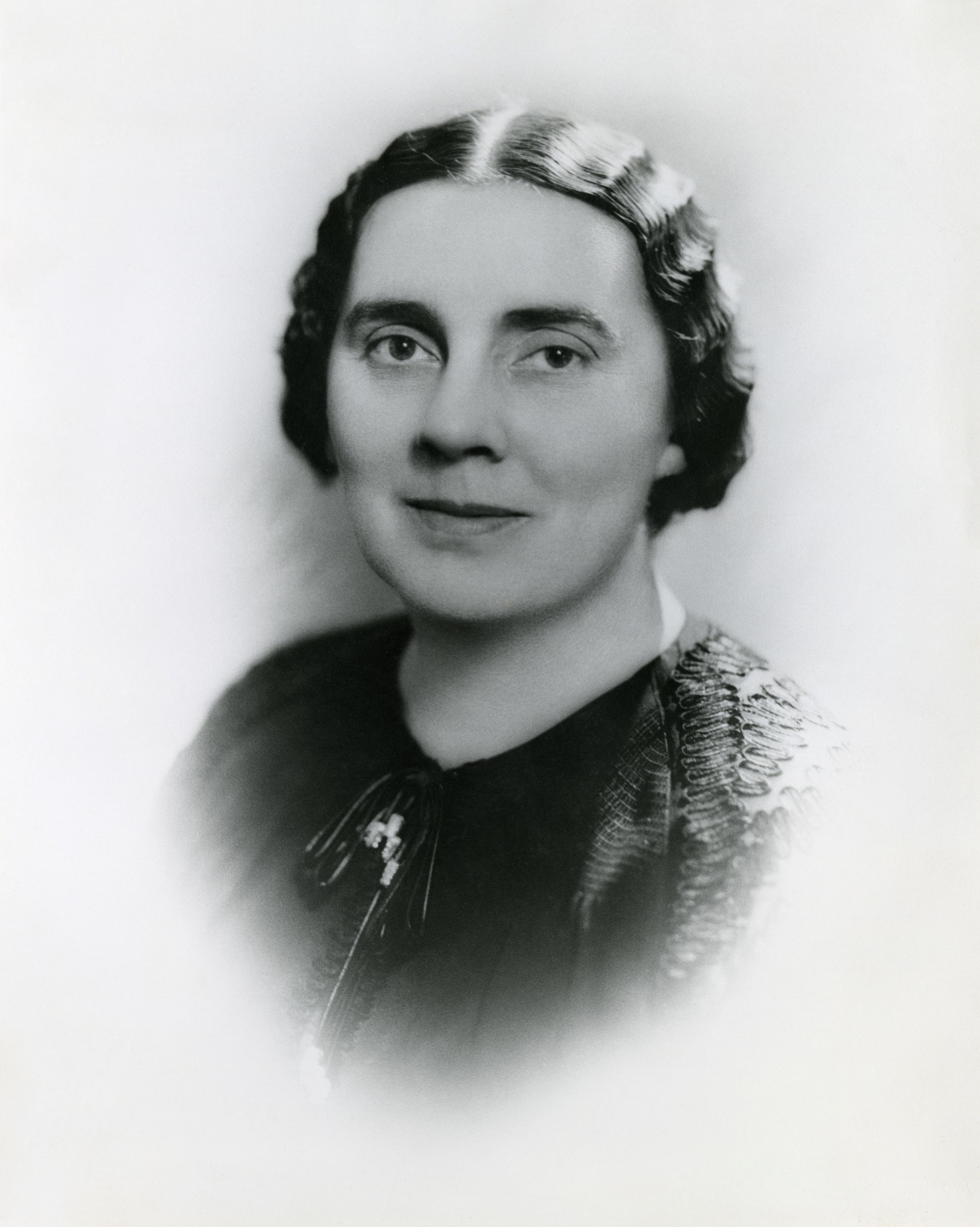
- Born: December 19, 1891; Norborne, Missouri, U.S.
- Died: October 22, 1974 (aged 82); Denton, Texas, U.S.
- Education: Missouri State University, Columbia University, Pennsylvania State University
- Known for: Work on nutrition, calcium, and bone density
- Awards: Garvan–Olin Medal (1950); Silver Snoopy award (1970)
- Scientific career
- Fields: Chemistry
- Workplaces: Pennsylvania State University, Texas Woman's University

Pauline Gracia Beery Mack (December 19, 1891 – October 22, 1974) was an American chemist, home economist, and college administrator. Her research in calcium, nutrition, radiation, and bone density began during the 1930s, and culminated in work for NASA when she was in her seventies.

== Early life and education ==
Pauline Beery was born in Norborne, Missouri. She earned a degree in chemistry at the University of Missouri (1913). During World War I, Beery taught high school science in Missouri, before returning to graduate work. She was granted a master's degree in chemistry in 1919, from Columbia University. In 1932, at age 40, Beery finished her doctoral work at Penn State.

== Career ==
Pauline Beery taught chemistry in the home economics program at Penn State beginning in 1919. In 1941, she was appointed director of the Ellen H. Richards Institute at the Pennsylvania State University. In 1950 her work on calcium, nutrition, and bone density measurement was recognized with a Francis P. Garvan Medal from the American Chemical Society.

While her main work was in nutrition and physiology, she was also concerned with textiles, detergents, and dyes. She was technical advisor to the Pennsylvania Laundry Owners Association, and helped to develop the standards code of the Pennsylvania Association of Cleaners and Dyers.

Dr. Mack was prolific in publications during her Penn State years, with titles including Chemistry Applied to Home and Economy (1926), Stuff: The Science of Materials in the Service of Man (New York: Appleton, 1930), Colorfastness of Women's and Children's Wearing-Apparel Fabrics (American Home Economics Association, 1942), and Calories Make a Difference: Report of Studies on Three Groups of Children (Sugar Research Foundation, 1949). She also created and edited "Chemistry Leaflet," a magazine published by the Science Service.

In her later years, she became dean of the College of Household Arts and Sciences at Texas State College for Women, and built an well-funded and well-regarded research program there during a decade as administrator (1952–1962). At age 70, she retired from administration to become a research director, working mainly on grants from NASA to understand the ways weightlessness might affect bone density. Her work resulted in a diet used to mitigate those effects. She was the first woman to receive a Silver Snoopy award for professional excellence.

== Personal life ==
Pauline Beery married botanist and printmaker Warren Bryan Mack in December 1923. She was widowed in 1952. Pauline Beery Mack retired from research due to ill health in 1973, and died the following year, at Denton, Texas.

== Legacy ==
Pauline Gracia Beery Mack's papers are in the Women's Collection Archives, Texas Woman's University, Denton, Texas, and at the Pennsylvania State University Libraries. Her grave is at the Centre County Memorial Park in State College, Pennsylvania.
