= Annie Kersting =

American chemist

- Education: University of Michigan
- Scientific career
- Thesis: Petrology and geochemistry of Klyuchevskoy Volcano, Kamchatka, U.S.S.R. : implications for the chemical and physical evolution of Island arcs (1991)

Annie Bernadette Kersting is a chemist known for her work on the movement of compounds such as plutonium in the environment. She was the 2016 recipient of the Garvan–Olin Medal from the American Chemical Society.

== Education and career ==
Kersting has a B.A. from the University of California, Berkeley (1983) and an M.S. from the University of Michigan, Ann Arbor (1987). In 1991 she earned her Ph.D. from the University of Michigan working on petrology and geochemistry of a volcano in Kamchatka.

== Research ==
Kersting is known for her work on the movement of plutonium and related compounds in the environment. In 1999 Kersting was the first to show that the movement of plutonium can occur on small particles, research that was based on the presence of plutonium downstream from Nevada Test Site.

== Selected publications ==
- Kersting, A. B.; Efurd, D. W.; Finnegan, D. L.; Rokop, D. J.; Smith, D. K.; Thompson, J. L. (1999). "Migration of plutonium in ground water at the Nevada Test Site". Nature. 397 (6714): 56–59. Bibcode:1999Natur.397...56K. doi:10.1038/16231. ISSN 0028-0836. S2CID 4420507.
- Kersting, Annie B. (2013-04-01). "Plutonium Transport in the Environment". Inorganic Chemistry. 52 (7): 3533–3546. doi:10.1021/ic3018908. ISSN 0020-1669. PMID 23458827.
- Kersting, Annie B.; Arculus, Richard J. (1994-02-01). "Klyuchevskoy Volcano, Kamchatka, Russia: The Role of High-Flux Recharged, Tapped, and Fractionated Magma Chamber(s) in the Genesis of High-Al2O3 from High-MgO Basalt". Journal of Petrology. 35 (1): 1–41. doi:10.1093/petrology/35.1.1. ISSN 0022-3530.
- Powell, Brian A.; Dai, Zurong; Zavarin, Mavrik; Zhao, Pihong; Kersting, Annie B. (2011-04-01). "Stabilization of Plutonium Nano-Colloids by Epitaxial Distortion on Mineral Surfaces". Environmental Science & Technology. 45 (7): 2698–2703. Bibcode:2011EnST...45.2698P. doi:10.1021/es1033487. ISSN 0013-936X. PMID 21446768.

== Awards and honors ==
In 2016 Kersting received the Garvan-Olin medal from the American Chemical Society; she was cited for "For seminal contributions to understanding radionuclide behavior in the environment, mentoring students and postdocs, and developing successful education programs in nuclear forensics and environmental radiochemistry".
