= Valerie J. Kuck =

American chemist

Valerie J. Kuck (Valerie Dziubek Kuck) is an American chemist. She is a Fellow of the American Chemical Society, and she was awarded the Garvan–Olin Medal in 2018 "for pioneering research on coatings for optical fibers and copper wire and for transformative achievements leading to a more diverse and inclusive chemical profession". Madeleine Jacobs, President of the Council of Scientific Society, commented on Kuck's reception of the award that "Valerie’s research led to 25 patents and 26 technical publications published in top peer-reviewed journals. [Her] service to chemistry and to the American Chemical Society is almost without peer".

== Education ==
Kuck studied for Bachelor of Science in chemistry at St. Mary-of-the-Woods College, graduating in 1961. She graduated with Masters in Chemistry from Purdue University. Her thesis at Perdue, "A Study of the Direct Synthesis of Biphenylene Silanes", was supervised by Professor Grant Urry.

== Career ==
Kuck worked at Lucent Technologies Bell Labs, Murray Hill, New Jersey, for thirty-four years, researching innovations in coatings for copper wire and optical fibres.

Kuck has been an active member of the American Chemical Society for over four decades, serving as Councillor (North Jersey and San Diego Sections) for thirty-four years. She served on the ACS Board of Directors for nine years.

She is a strong supporter of newcomers to the chemical research profession, directing initiatives to help young researchers develop their careers – from high schoolers to professionals entering the workforce. She works especially on encouraging women to pursue careers in chemistry and to apply for top positions and awards.

== Honors ==
Kuck has received three national American Chemical Society Awards: a National Award for Volunteer Service to the Society; a National Award for Encouraging Women into Careers in the Chemical Sciences; and the Santa Clara Section of ACS awarded Kuck the Shirley Radding Award.

Between 2001 and 2002 Kuck served as the Sylvia M. Stoesser Lecturer in Chemistry at University of Illinois.

Kuck was made a Fellow of ACS in 2016.

Awarded the Francis P. Garvan-John M. Olin Medal in 2018.

She is a Distinguished Alumnus of the Purdue University Chemistry Department.

In 2019 she was given the Distinguished Alumni Award from St Mary-of-the-Woods College.

== Selected published work ==
=== Chemistry ===
- Hammond, George S.; Kuck, Valerie J.; American Chemical Society. Division of Inorganic Chemistry; American Chemical Society. Meeting (1992). Fullerenes : synthesis, properties, and chemistry of large carbon clusters : developed from a symposium sponsored by the Divisions of Inorganic Chemistry, Organic Chemistry, Petroleum Chemistry, Inc., Polymer Chemistry, Inc., and Polymeric Materials: Science and Engineering at the 201st National Meeting of the American Chemical Society, Atlanta, Georgia, April 14–19, 1991. Washington, DC: American Chemical Society. ISBN 0-8412-2182-0. OCLC 24845157.
- Bao, Z.; Kuck, V.; Rogers, J.A.; Paczkowski, M.A. (5 August 2002). "Silsesquioxane Resins as High-Performance Solution Processible Dielectric Materials for Organic Transistor Applications". Advanced Functional Materials. 12 (8). Wiley: 526. doi:10.1002/1616-3028(20020805)12:8<526::aid-adfm526>3.0.co;2-s. ISSN 1616-301X.

=== Gender and chemistry ===
- Nolan, Susan A.; Buckner, Janine P.; Marzabadi, Cecilia H.; Kuck, Valerie J. (1 December 2007). "Training and Mentoring of Chemists: A Study of Gender Disparity". Sex Roles. 58 (3–4). Springer Science and Business Media LLC: 235–250. doi:10.1007/s11199-007-9310-5. ISSN 0360-0025.
