= Kathlyn A. Parker =

Chemist

Kathlyn Parker
- Education: Stanford University
- Scientific career
- Workplaces: Stony Brook University; Brown University
- Thesis: Part I. The synthesis of dendrolasin; Part II. The cyclization of 4-(trans, trans-7,12-dimethyl-3,7,11-tridecatrienyl)-3-methyl-2-cyclohexen-1-ol. (1970)

Kathlyn Ann Parker is a chemist known for her work on synthesis of compounds, especially organic compounds with biological roles. She is an elected fellow of the American Chemical Society and a recipient of the Garvan–Olin Medal in chemistry.

== Education and career ==
Parker graduated from Senn High School in Chicago. She went on to receive a B.A. from Northwestern University (1966). While in college she won an award from the student chapter of the American Institute of Chemists for her essay "Chemistry as a Profession" making her the first woman to receive this award. She earned her Ph.D. from Stanford University in 1970. Following her Ph.D. she was a postdoctoral research at Columbia University. From 1973 until 2001 Parker was in the chemistry department at Brown University. In 2001 she moved to Stony Brook University, and in 2017 she was named a distinguished professor at Stony Brook University.

== Research ==
Parker is known for her work in the field of organic synthesis, where she works on the construction of natural products through methods that allow for efficient synthesis of known organic compounds.

== Selected publications ==
- Parker, Kathlyn A.; Ledeboer, Mark W. (1996-01-01). "Asymmetric Reduction. A Convenient Method for the Reduction of Alkynyl Ketones". The Journal of Organic Chemistry. 61 (9): 3214–3217. doi:10.1021/jo951712o. ISSN 0022-3263. PMID 11667191.
- Parker, Kathlyn A.; Fokas, Demosthenes (1992). "Convergent synthesis of (.+-.)-dihydroisocodeine in 11 steps by the tandem radical cyclization strategy. A formal total synthesis of (.+-.)-morphine". Journal of the American Chemical Society. 114 (24): 9688–9689. doi:10.1021/ja00050a075. ISSN 0002-7863.
- Parker, Kathlyn A.; O'Fee, Robert (1983). "Halonium-initiated cyclizations of allylic urethanes: stereo- and regioselectivity in functionalizing the olefinic bond". Journal of the American Chemical Society. 105 (3): 654–655. doi:10.1021/ja00341a073. ISSN 0002-7863.
- Parker, Kathlyn A.; Mindt, Thomas L. (2001-11-01). "Electrocyclic Ring Closure of the Enols of Vinyl Quinones. A 2H -Chromene Synthesis". Organic Letters. 3 (24): 3875–3878. doi:10.1021/ol0167199. ISSN 1523-7060. PMID 11720558.

== Awards and honors ==
In 1987 Parker was a fellow of the John Simon Guggenheim Foundation. In 2009 the Parker was elected a fellow of the American Chemical Society and she received the Francis P. Garvan-John M. Olin Medal from the American Chemical Society. In 2017 she received the Arthur C. Cope Scholar Award in recognition of her work synthesizing organic compounds.
