= Judith Giordan =

American chemist and businesswoman

Judith Cynthia Giordan
- Education: University of Maryland, College Park; Rutgers University
- Scientific career
- Institutions: Oregon State University
- Thesis: Negative ion states of selected unsaturated hydrocarbons (1980)
- Website: Judy Giordan

Judith C. Giordan is an American chemist and businesswoman who is Professor of Practice at Oregon State University. She serves as President Elect of the American Chemical Society. She was awarded the 2010 Garvan–Olin Medal.

== Early life and education ==
Giordan was an undergraduate student at Rutgers University, where she earned a Bachelor's degree in environmental science. She moved to the University of Maryland, College Park for doctoral research on unsaturated hydrocarbons. After earning her doctorate, Giordan joined the Goethe University Frankfurt, where she worked as an Alexander von Humboldt Foundation fellow. After graduating, Giordan joined the Henkel Corporation, where she worked in research and development.

== Research and career ==
Giordan worked as a Vice President of Research and Development at PepsiCo.

Giordan works on research and training programs, as well as commercial development. She is the founder of ecosVC, an organization that looks to translate research into commercially successful innovations, and the Chemical Agent Network.

In 2015, the Alexander von Humboldt Foundation supported Giordan in establishing a network of women innovators. The network looked to support women working in science and technology around the world.

== Awards and honors ==
- 1980 Alexander von Humboldt Postdoctoral Fellow
- 1990 Who's Who in Research and American Women
- 2010 Garvan–Olin Medal
- 2013 Elected Fellow of the American Chemical Society
- 2014 American Chemical Society Henry Whalen Award
- 2015 Alexander von Humboldt Alumni Networking Award
- 2022 President Elect of the American Chemical Society

== Selected publications ==
- Giordan, Judith C. (1983-10-01). "Negative ions: effect of .alpha.- vs. .beta.-silyl substitution on the negative ion states of .pi. systems". Journal of the American Chemical Society. 105 (22): 6544–6546. Bibcode:1983JAChS.105.6544G. doi:10.1021/ja00360a002. ISSN 0002-7863.
- Giordan, Judith C.; Moore, John H.; Tossell, John A.; Kaim, Wolfgang (October 1985). "Interaction of frontier orbitals of Group 15 and Group 16 methides with the frontier orbitals of benzene". Journal of the American Chemical Society. 107 (20): 5600–5604. Bibcode:1985JAChS.107.5600G. doi:10.1021/ja00306a003. ISSN 0002-7863.
- Giordan, Judith C.; Moore, John H. (1983-10-01). "Anion states of para-disubstituted benzenes: p-Di-tert-butylbenzene and related group 4 molecules: p-bis[trimethyl(silyl, germyl, and stannyl)]benzene". Journal of the American Chemical Society. 105 (22): 6541–6544. Bibcode:1983JAChS.105.6541G. doi:10.1021/ja00360a001. ISSN 0002-7863.
