= Gladys Anderson Emerson =

American historian, biochemist and nutritionist (1903–1984)

Gladys Ludwina Anderson Emerson
- Born: July 1, 1903; Caldwell, Kansas
- Died: January 18, 1984 (aged 80); Santa Monica, California
- Education: Oklahoma College for Women; Stanford University; University of California, Berkeley
- Known for: Isolation of pure vitamin E
- Spouse: Oliver Emerson (m. 1932–1940)
- Awards: Garvan–Olin Medal (1952)
- Scientific career
- Fields: Biochemistry, nutrition
- Institutions: University of Göttingen, Germany; University of California, Berkeley; Merck & Co.; Sloan Kettering Institute; University of California, Los Angeles

Gladys Ludwina Anderson Emerson (July 1, 1903 – January 18, 1984) was an American historian, biochemist and nutritionist who researched the impact of vitamins on the body. She was the first person to isolate Vitamin E in a pure form, and won the Garvan–Olin Medal in 1952.

== Early life and education ==
Gladys Anderson was born on July 1, 1903, in Caldwell, Kansas; she was the only child of Otis and Louise (Williams) Anderson. She attended grade school in Fort Worth, Texas, and high school in El Reno, Oklahoma.

She received her Bachelor of Science (B.S.) degree in chemistry and physics and her Artium Baccalaureatus (A.B.) degree in English from the Oklahoma College for Women. In 1926, she earned her Master of Arts (M.A.) degree in history and economics from Stanford.

After being a department head at a junior high school, teaching geography and history, she accepted a fellowship in biochemistry and nutrition at the University of California, Berkeley. She completed her Ph.D. in animal nutrition and biochemistry at Berkeley in 1932. In 1932, she married her colleague, Dr. Oliver Huddleston Emerson. Immediately following, they both were accepted as postdoctoral fellows at the University of Göttingen, Germany, where she worked with Nobel Prize winners Adolf Otto Reinhold Windaus and Adolf Butenandt.

== Research career ==
From 1933 to 1942, Anderson was a research associate at the Institute of Experimental Biology at the University of California at Berkeley, working with Herbert McLean Evans. Herbert Evans and Katharine Bishop had identified and named Vitamin E in 1922, but Gladys Emerson was the first person to isolate it, by obtaining alpha-tocopherol from wheat germ oil. In 1940, she and her husband divorced.

In 1942, she went to work for Merck & Co. as a staff researcher, where she remained for 14 years culminating in her role as head of the department of animal nutrition. She worked with rhesus monkeys, studying Vitamin b complex. At Merck, she identified the impact of withholding B_{6} as contributing to the development of arteriosclerosis, or hardening of the arteries.

From 1950 to 1953, she worked at the Sloan-Kettering Institute, researching the link between diet and cancer.

In 1956, she became a professor of nutrition at the College of Letters and Sciences at the University of California, Los Angeles. In 1961, she moved to the division of nutritional sciences in the University's School of Public Health, where she served as vice-chairman from 1962 to 1970.

In 1969, President Richard M. Nixon appointed Emerson as vice president of the Panel on the Provision of Food as It Affects the Consumer (The White House Conference on Food, Nutrition, and Health). In 1970, she served as an expert witness before the Food and Drug Administration's hearing on vitamins and mineral supplements and additives to food.

== Personal life ==
According to a close friend and colleague of hers, she was a practical joker. Shortly after earning garage privileges at Merck, Karl Folkers was working late. Emerson obtained a parking ticket, which she placed on the windshield of his car on her way out. Folkers called her when he got home at 2 am to accuse her of being a prankster.

She died January 18, 1984, in Santa Monica, California. She was buried near her parents in El Reno, Oklahoma, on January 24, 1984.
