= Grace Medes =

American biochemist

- Born: November 9, 1886; Keokuk, Iowa
- Died: December 31, 1967 (aged 81)
- Awards: Garvan-Olin Medal

Academic background
- Education: University of Kansas; Bryn Mawr College

Academic work
- Institutions: Vassar College; Wellesley College; University of Minnesota Medical School; Lankenau Institute for Medical Research
- Main interests: biochemistry
- Notable ideas: tyrosinosis

Grace Medes (November 9, 1886 – December 31, 1967) was an American biochemist, who discovered tyrosinosis—a metabolic disorder today known as tyrosinemia—and studied fatty acid metabolism. She was awarded the Garvan-Olin Medal in 1955 for her work.

== Early life and education ==
Grace May Medes was born in Keokuk, Iowa, daughter of William Johnson Medes and Kate Francisco Hagny Medes. She earned her bachelor's and master's degrees at the University of Kansas, both in zoology, and a PhD at Bryn Mawr College in 1916.

== Career ==
After earning her PhD, Medes went to teach at Vassar College in 1916 serving first as an instructor in zoology until 1919 and then as an assistant professor of physiology until 1922. She was the first female faculty member with a PhD in the physiology department at Vassar. Medes moved to Wellesley College in 1922, where she served as associate professor of physiology until 1924. In 1924 she went to University of Minnesota Medical School where she served as a fellow for her first year and then an assistant professor until 1932.

In her time at Minnesota, Medes discovered the human metabolic disorder she named "tyrosinosis" in 1932. Although her patient was atypical and the mechanism she identified has since been questioned, her testing methods remain a useful model for researchers studying the disorder now known as tyrosinemia.

In 1932, Medes became head of the department of metabolic chemistry at the Lankenau Institute for Medical Research in Philadelphia, Pennsylvania, where she specialized in the metabolism of sulfur and fatty acids. Her work established a basis for the later discovery of Coenzyme A. She would remain at the institute (later merged with the Institute for Cancer Research) as a research faculty member until 1952. She was a senior member from 1954 to 1960.

In 1955, Medes won the Garvan Medal (now the Garvan-Olin Medal) from the American Chemical Society as an outstanding woman in chemistry. Also in 1955, Medes was one of the year's five distinguished alumni by the University of Kansas.

While in retirement, Medes resumed her work on tyrosinosis, which she put aside while at Lankenau, at the Fels Research Institute at Temple University. She co-authored a book, Normal Growth and Cancer (1963) with colleague Stanley P. Reimann. This book was published to help people gain knowledge about cancer and its affects on peoples lives and the proceeds helped raise money for cancer research.

A symposium on tyrosinosis was held in Oslo, Norway in her honor in 1965.

== Personal life ==
Medes died on New Year's Eve in 1967. She was 81 years old.
