= James Pitts (chemist) =

American chemist (1921–2014)

James N. Pitts Jr. (January 10, 1921 – June 19, 2014) was an American chemist and researcher known for his work in the fields of photochemistry and atmospheric chemistry. Pitts was a pioneer in the study of smog and air pollution, especially in Los Angeles County. Pitts co-founded the Statewide Air Pollution Research Center at the University of California, Riverside in 1961 and served as the center's director from 1970 to 1988. He authored more than 400 scientific publications and four books on the subjects, especially smog.

Pitts' research formed the basis for California's air quality laws. According to the chair of the Air Resources Board, Mary Nichols, "Jim Pitts was probably the single person most responsible for the understanding of what strategies we need to clean up Southern California's air...He was able to explain all of this in English to policymakers so that they would be able to accept that it was going to take extensive and difficult actions to control emissions." He often invited state and federal officials to his smog chamber at UC Irvine, including Jerry Brown and Ronald Reagan, to demonstrate the effects of smog and air pollution. In a common demonstration, Pitts would fill an Erlenmeyer flask with ozone and then twist a slice of lemon onto the flask. The ensuing chemical reaction, which quickly produced a fog, demonstrated the formation of smog in the atmosphere.

Pitts refused funding from industry groups, which increased his center's credibility. He was the recipient of numerous awards and recognitions from the California State Assembly, the United States Congress, the Coalition for Clean Air, the South Coast Air Quality Management District, and the California state air board.

Pitts was born on January 10, 1921, in Salt Lake City, Utah, to Esther (née Bengtson) and James N. Pitts. The family moved to West Los Angeles when he was just six months old. A high school teacher sparked his interest in chemistry during his junior year.

Pitts enrolled as a chemistry student at University of California, Los Angeles (UCLA) in 1939. He left during World War II, joining a group of young scientists who conducted classified chemical warfare field tests. Their work led to the development of more effective gas mask for Allied forces during the war. He returned to UCLA, where he received a bachelor's degree in chemistry in 1945 and a doctorate in 1949. Pitts initially worked as a faculty member of Northwestern University. He was at the time married to a woman by the name of Nancy Ann Quirt. James and Nancy had three daughters Linda, Christie and Beckie.

Pitts was hired as a founding professor at UC Riverside in 1954.

Pitts married his second wife, UC Irvine chemist and professor Barbara Finlayson-Pitts in 1970. He followed her to the University of California, Irvine in 1994, where the two collaborated of research and co-authored books and other publications.

James Pitts died of natural causes at his home in Irvine, California, on June 19, 2014, at the age of 93. He was survived by his wife, Barbara Finlayson-Pitts, and three daughters, Linda Lee, Christie Hoffman and Beckie St. George. He was also survived by five grandchildren Kristin Cohn, Brianna Hoffman, Trevin Hoffman, Mallory St George and Ryan Giordano. His great-grandchildren include Brandon, Kyle, Austin and Riley.
