= Sarah Ratner =

American biochemist

- Born: June 9, 1903; New York City
- Died: July 28, 1999 (aged 96)
- Scientific career
- Fields: Biochemistry

Sarah Ratner (June 9, 1903 – July 28, 1999) was an American biochemist. Her contributions to the study of nitrogen metabolism led to a better understanding of human disorders in urea synthesis. In 1961, Ratner was awarded the Garvan–Olin Medal from the American Chemical Society and was elected to the National Academy of Sciences in 1974.

== Early life ==
Ratner's parents were Russian-Jewish immigrants who came to the United States in the late 1900s. Her father, Aaron Ratner owned a manufacturing business. Along with her twin brother, Sarah was born June 9, 1903, in New York City. She was the youngest child and only girl among the five children. Her father provided her with the same academic education as her brothers, but she became the only family member who pursued a scholarly career.

== Career ==
Ratner received a scholarship to Cornell University in 1920 as a chemistry major. As the only woman in most of her classes, and due to her shy nature, she had a difficult time sharing her experiences and ideas with her colleagues. After graduating in 1924, Ratner was employed in a Pediatrics laboratory at Long Island College Hospital in New York City.

As a graduate student, Ratner gravitated towards biochemistry, which in the early 1930s was mainly preoccupied with physiology and organic chemistry. She was accepted as a Ph.D. student by Hans Thacher Clarke in the Department of Biochemistry at the College of Physicians and Surgeons at Columbia University. The admission requirement to the department at the time was simply to "survive an interview with H.T. [Clarke], at the end of which the potential student was immediately informed of the outcome." In 1932, in collaboration with C. A. Weymuller, she published a study of the acid-base metabolism of a normal child on diets that increase in fat content. Together, they discussed the "seventeen different analytical methods were used for determination of a wide variety of parameters in blood serum and feces."

After receiving her doctorate, Ratner had difficulty obtaining a research position because many labs did not hire women. Eventually she was hired by Rudolf Schoenheimer of the College of Physicians and Surgeons to investigate the metabolic processes of nitrogen compounds. From 1937 to 1939 Ratner worked under a Josiah Macy, Jr. Foundation Research Fellowship, and from 1939 to 1946 she earned the academic titles of instructor and assistant professor at Columbia University.

Following her work in 1942 with David E. Green on amino- and hydroxy acid oxidases, and on a peptide form of p-aminobenzoic acid, she became interested in new aspects of nitrogen metabolism. In 1946, Ratner was hired as an assistant professor of pharmacology at the New York University School of Medicine. The following year she published a book on the mechanism of the formation of arginine from citrulline, a subject which would occupy her studies for the next four decades. She was elected a Fellow of the American Academy of Arts and Sciences in 1974.

Ratner became a staff member of the Department of Biochemistry at the Public Health Research Institute of New York in the mid-1950s. She retired in 1992 at the age of 89.

== Honors ==
- Carl Neuberg Medal, American Society of European Chemists and Pharmacists (1959)
- Garvan–Olin Medal, American Chemical Society (1961)
- Fellow, National Academy of Sciences (1974)
- Fellow, American Academy of Arts and Sciences (1974)
- Freedman Award in Biochemistry, New York Academy of Sciences (1975)
- Honorary Doctorate, University of North Carolina (1981)

== Selected works ==
- "Biosynthesis of Urea. I. Enzymatic Mechanism of Arginine Synthesis from Citrulline" (Ratner, S., and Pappas, A. (1949) J. Biol. Chem. 179, 1183–1198)⇓
- "Biosynthesis of Urea. VI. Enzymatic Cleavage of Argininosuccinic Acid to Arginine and Fumaric Acid" (Ratner, S., Anslow, W. P., Jr., and Petrack, B. (1953) J. Biol. Chem. 204, 115–125)
