= Kathleen C. Taylor =

American chemist, developed the catalytic converter for cars

- Born: 1942 (age 83–84)
- Education: Northwestern University
- Scientific career
- Workplaces: General Motors
- Thesis: The surface chemistry of chromium oxides catalysts (1968)

Kathleen C. Taylor (born 1942) is a chemist who won the Garvan–Olin Medal in 1989, and is notable for developing catalytic converters for cars.

== Education ==
Taylor attended Douglass College at Rutgers University, earning a bachelor's in chemistry in 1964. She completed her Ph.D. in physical chemistry in 1968 at Northwestern University working with Robert Burwell, Jr. on the surface chemistry of catalysts. Following her Ph.D., she did postdoctoral research at the University of Edinburgh with Charles Kemball where she worked on the use of deuterium to track reactions on catalysts.

== Career ==
In 1970, Taylor joined General Motors where she is known for her work on catalytic converters that helped reduce pollution from car exhaust. Taylor developed catalytic converters that converted nitric oxide into nitrogen, instead of ammonia, a toxin to humans. In 1987, while at General Motors, Taylor also served as president of the Materials Research Society.

When Taylor was elected a fellow of the National Academy of Engineering in 1995, she was cited "for the development of automotive-exhaust catalytic systems and leadership in materials battery and fuel cell research".

In a 2014 interview, Taylor described her work as an engineer and noted that she selected the field because she liked the challenge of engineering and the employment options that would available to her. As of 2017, she was retired from General Motors, but continued to consult at Columbia University and the United States Department of Energy on projects that reduce impacts on the environment.

== Selected publications ==
- Taylor, Kathleen C. (1993-12-01). "Nitric Oxide Catalysis in Automotive Exhaust Systems". Catalysis Reviews. 35 (4): 457–481. doi:10.1080/01614949308013915. ISSN 0161-4940.
- Taylor, Kathleen C. (1984), "Automobile Catalytic Converters", Advances in Comparative and Environmental Physiology, vol. 7, Berlin, Heidelberg: Springer Berlin Heidelberg, pp. 119–170, doi:10.1007/978-3-642-93247-2_2, ISBN 978-3-642-75899-7
- Taylor, Kathleen C.; Schlatter, James C. (1980-05-01). "Selective reduction of nitric oxide over noble metals". Journal of Catalysis. 63 (1): 53–71. doi:10.1016/0021-9517(80)90059-7. ISSN 0021-9517.

== Awards ==
- 1988 - Garvan Award from the American Chemical Society
- 1994, Fellow, American Association for the Advancement of Science
- 1995, National Academy of Engineering
- 1997, Fellow, Society of Automotive Engineers
- 2003, American Academy of Arts and Sciences
- 2006, Indian National Academy of Engineering

== Personal life ==
Taylor is a painter who works in watercolors on scenes in Florida and Massachusetts.
