= Caroline Chick Jarrold =

Physical chemist

Caroline Chick Jarrold is a physical chemist who was named the Class of 1948 Herman B Wells Endowed Professor ats at Indiana University in Bloomington, Indiana, in 2018. The research done by her group aims to alleviate issues with energy and the environment.

== Early life and education ==
Caroline grew up in Detroit, Michigan, and received a Bachelor of Science in chemistry from the University of Michigan in 1989. Working under Professor A.H. Francis, a physical chemist. She completed her Ph.D. in physical chemistry at the University of California, Berkeley under Daniel M. Neumark. As a University of California President’s Postdoctoral Fellow at UCLA, Caroline worked under James R. Heath until she left to join the chemistry faculty at the University of Illinois, Chicago in 1997. In 2002, she left to join the Indiana University chemistry faculty in Bloomington, Indiana, where she still conducts research today.

== Career ==
Jarrold serves as a professor, researcher, and chair for the department of chemistry at Indiana University. Her research utilizes the applications of gas-phase reactivity, mass spectrometry, anion photodetachment spectroscopies, and computational chemistry, and her research focuses on: design an optimization of heterogeneous catalysts with lower operating temperatures, oxidation of volatile organic compounds in atmospheric reaction complexes and exploration of electronic structures that arise in heteronuclear lanthanide complexes. Jarrold's multi-disciplinary research on electron-neutral interactions earned her a spot in the American Association for the Advancement of Science's 2023 fellows class.

== Awards and honors ==
- 2020 Garvan–Olin Medal
- 2018 Herman B Wells Endowed Professor
- 2003–2005 NSF Career Award
- 1995–1996 University of California President's Postdoctoral Fellow
