= Miriam Elizabeth Simpson =

American doctor and Professor of anatomy

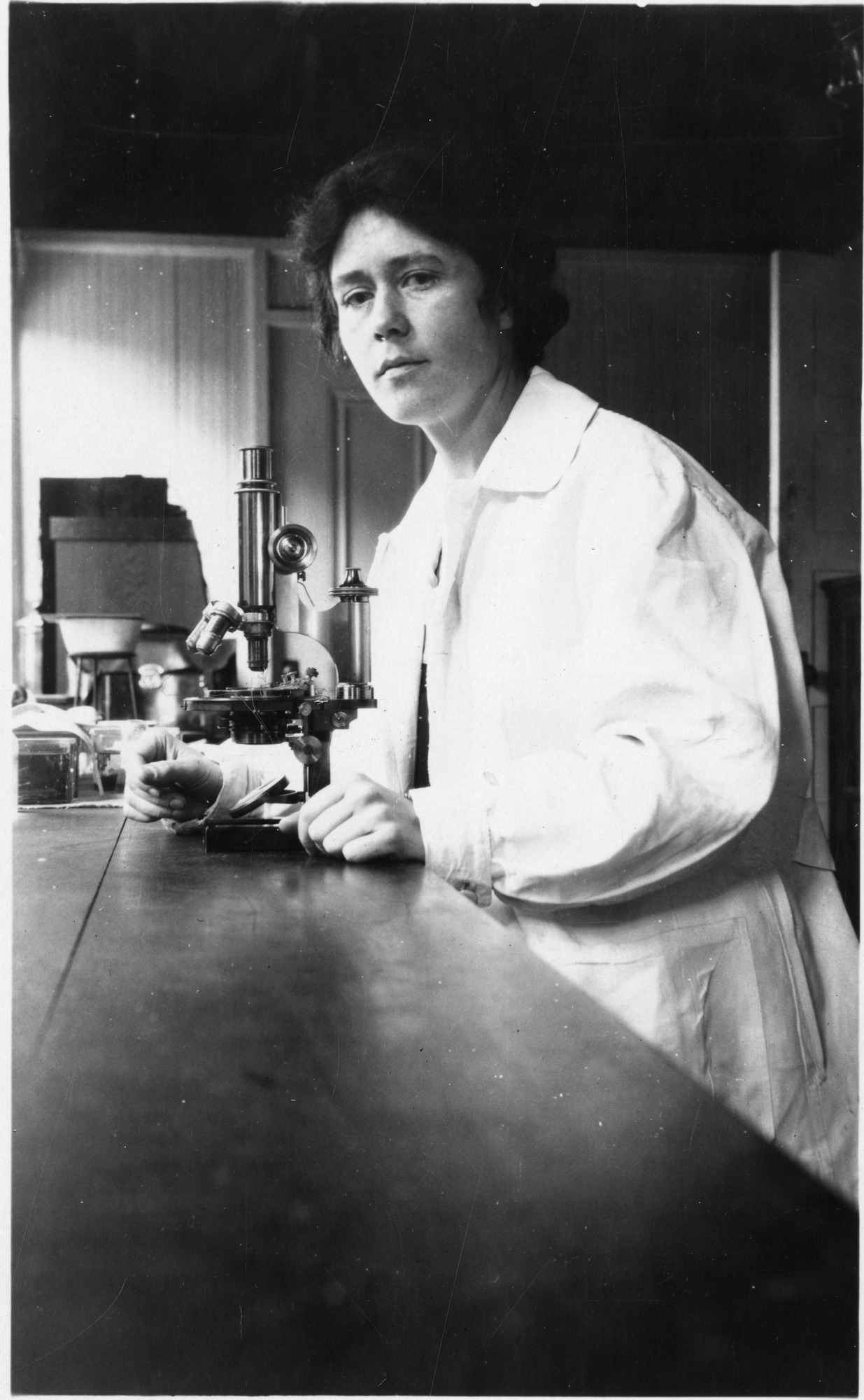
- Born: May 26, 1894; Sheridan, Wyoming
- Died: October 2, 1991 (aged 97); Berkeley, California
- Citizenship: USA
- Education: University of California, Berkeley; Johns Hopkins University
- Scientific career
- Fields: Anatomy, medicine, chemistry
- Workplaces: University of California, Berkeley
- Academic advisors: Herbert McLean Evans

Miriam Elizabeth Simpson (May 26, 1894 – October 2, 1991) was an American scientist who in 1921 earned the first Ph.D. in anatomy conferred from the University of California. Two years later, she was awarded Doctor of Medicine from Johns Hopkins University (1923).

== Early life and education ==
Miriam E. Simpson studied as an undergraduate, and then graduate student, at the University of California, Berkeley. She earned an A.B. in chemistry in 1915 and M.A. in chemistry in 1916.

Simpson received her Ph.D. in anatomy from the University of California in 1921. Her second Ph.D. in medicine was awarded by Johns Hopkins University in 1923. During her time at Johns Hopkins and Berkeley, she worked closely with Herbert McLean Evans conducting research in pituitary glands and hormone injections.

== Research legacy ==
Simpson was an active researcher and instructor in anatomy, focusing on histology and endocrinology. She taught at UC Berkeley from 1923 to 1961. Simpson's research and teaching focus, as well as specialized training in medicine and chemistry, complemented other research in anatomy at the university.

She was promoted to full Professor in 1945, with the “Emerita” distinction added to her title upon her retirement in 1961. In 1952, following the retirement of mentor and research colleague Herbert McLean Evans, Simpson took over responsibilities as acting as Director of the Institute of Experimental Biology. After the Institute was dissolved in 1958, she oversaw the establishment of the Microscopic Anatomy course at the University of California, San Francisco, while continuing to share in teaching the course in Berkeley. This divided appointment continued on the two campuses until her retirement in 1961.

During her long research collaboration with Evans, Simpson led the endocrine research portion of the institute. Together, with Choh Hao Li and Evans, Simpson's research resulted in remarkable successes in 1943, 1944, and 1949. These were, a purified thyreotropic and adrenocorticotropic hormone ACTH, growth hormone, and follicle-stimulating hormone (FSH), respectively.

== Distinctions, publications, and memberships ==
- Executive Committee of the American Association of Anatomists (1950–54)
- Ferris Lecturer at Yale University (1950)
- Honorary Doctor of Science degree - The University of Aix-Marseille (1951)
- Honorary Doctor of Laws - University of California, San Francisco (1966)
