= Barbara J. Finlayson-Pitts =

Canadian-American atmospheric chemist

- Education: Trent University, University of California, Riverside (PhD 1973)
- Known for: Chemistry of the Upper and Lower Atmosphere: Theory, Experiments, and Applications
- Spouse: James Pitts
- Awards: Garvan–Olin Medal
- Scientific career
- Fields: Atmospheric chemistry
- Workplaces: California State University, Fullerton, University of California, Irvine

Barbara J. Finlayson-Pitts is a Canadian-American atmospheric chemist. She is a professor in the chemistry department at the University of California, Irvine and is the Director of AirUCI Institute. Finlayson-Pitts and James N. Pitts, Jr. are the authors of Chemistry of the Upper and Lower Atmosphere: Theory, Experiments, and Applications (1999). She has been a member of the National Academy of Sciences since 2006 and is the laureate for the 2017 Garvan–Olin Medal. In 2016 she co-chaired the National Academy of Science report "The Future of Atmospheric Chemistry Research".

Finlayson-Pitts investigates the chemistry of the upper and lower atmosphere and ways in which chemical reactions in the atmosphere are involved in air pollution and climate change. She and her team work to develop a molecular-level understanding of gaseous reactions of particles in different layers of the atmosphere, and at the interfaces between layers. They also study the interface between air and water. She emphasizes the "urgency for addressing climate change at all levels of government in the U.S. and globally".

== Education ==
Finlayson-Pitts received a Bachelor of Science from Trent University in Peterborough, Ontario, in 1970. She earned her master's and PhD in chemistry from the University of California, Riverside in 1971 and 1973, respectively. After completing a postdoctoral fellowship at UC Riverside, she worked as a professor of chemistry at California State University, Fullerton from 1974 to 1994. In 1994, she joined the chemistry department of the University of California, Irvine.

== Research ==
Finlayson-Pitts' research focuses on developing a molecular-level understanding of the fundamental kinetics, mechanisms, and photochemistry of gaseous reactions of particles. She is particularly interested in how reactions occur in different layers of the atmosphere, and at the interfaces of different layers. In addition to her work on the troposphere and stratosphere, she studies interactions at the interface between air and water, where gases meet liquids. Reactions that occur at the surface between layers may differ from the reactions that occur within each layer.

In the atmosphere, emitted gases and particles may react further to form new chemical species. Some compounds may not react within the troposphere, but will break down and participate in further transformations in the higher stratosphere. The inorganic chemistry of oxides of nitrogen and sulfur in the gas phase are better understood than the interactions of nitrogen and sulfur oxides with organic compounds. Finlayson-Pitts and her colleagues have done important work on understanding the chemistry of the troposphere, in particular, the conversion of nitric oxide (NO) to nitrogen dioxide (NO_{2}) in air and the subsequent formation of ozone, nitric acid, and organic nitrates.

Finlayson-Pitts served as the lead author of a 2009 study published in the Proceedings of the National Academy of Sciences that found that burning fossil fuels releases nitrogen oxides, which interact with gaseous hydrogen chloride to form smog-forming compounds. The study also found water vapor enhances the reaction.

Finlayson-Pitts and her team examined reactions between nitrogen dioxide (NO_{2}) and dinitrogen pentoxide(N_{2}O_{5}), two common compounds created from fossil fuel combustion prevalent in the atmosphere, and gaseous hydrogen chloride (HCl), which has reached concentrations of a few parts per billion in polluted air. The authors of the study proposed N_{2}O_{5} exists as an asymmetric dimer, NO_{2}^{+}NO_{3}^{−}. They also hypothesized water molecules promote the ionization of N_{2}O_{5} to NO_{2}^{+}NO_{3}^{−}.When NO_{2} reacts with HCl (in the form of NO_{2}^{+}NO_{3}^{−}), it creates ClO and HNO_{3}, and when N_{2}O_{5} reacts with HCl, it forms ClNO_{2} and HNO_{3}.

The team said the creation of the chlorine nitrogen compounds could have negative implications for the reliability and lifetime of electronics that are susceptible to corrosion when the reaction takes place in doors. Light absorption crosses into section in near ultraviolet and overlaps strongly not only with solar radiation but also with that from fluorescent lights, causing smog. The chlorine-containing molecules also react with nitrogen monoxide (NO) to produce ozone.

In a 2010 paper, Finlayson-Pitts detailed the role of halogens in reactions of the lower atmosphere. She found that chlorine ions in the air help ozone formation, while bromine ions aide ozone destruction. Both ions are common in the troposphere due to cycles between seawater and gaseous phases. Chloride, which is many times more abundant than bromine, reacts with nitrogen and oxygen-containing compounds in both the aqueous and gas phases to form a variety of molecules that scatter light, including HCl, Cl_{2}, ClNO_{2}, ClO, and OClO.

Finlayson-Pitts also helped author a 2012 study published in the Proceedings of the National Academy of Sciences which concluded that new models may be needed to address secondary organic aerosols. Finlayson-Pitts worked with scientists from UCI and the Pacific Northwest National Laboratory in Richland, Washington, to research the processes leading to secondary organic aerosol formation. More specifically, they studied particle formation under the simultaneous oxidation α-pinene by ozone and NO_{3} radicals using an aerosol flow system. α-Pinene is emitted by vegetation in varying quantities, depending on temperature and light conditions. The reaction of α-pinene with NO_{3} radicals in the atmosphere creates low-volatility particles, generating secondary organic aerosols. These particles were previously thought to condense into tiny droplets of liquid and then dissipate as those drops of liquid evaporate. Finlayson-Pitts and the team she worked with found that secondary organic aerosols actually attach themselves more tightly to organic particles in the air. Because of this, previous models underestimate the amount of fine particles, which are linked to both lung and heart disease, in the air.

Her research group has received funding from the National Science Foundation and the Department of Energy. They are a part of Atmospheric Integrated Research for Understanding Chemistry at Interfaces (AirUCI), a collaboration from across the University of California-Irvine. AirUCI examines how air quality and climate change are affected by processes that occur at the atmosphere's air-water interface, and focuses on the impacts of energy use, air pollution, and air quality on human health.

== Personal life ==
Barbara J. Finlayson-Pitts married James Pitts (1921–2014) in 1970. James Pitts was also a chemist. He followed her to the University of California, Irvine in 1994, where the two collaborated on research and co-authored books and other publications.

== Awards ==
- 1993 Fellow of the American Association for the Advancement of Science
- 1999 "Service Through Chemistry" Award, Orange County Section of the American Chemical Society
- 2004 American Chemical Society Award for Creative Advances in Environmental Science & Technology
- 2007 Richard C. Tolman Award, Southern California Section of the American Chemical Society
- 2009 Coalition for Clean Air Carl Moyer Award for Scientific Leadership and Technical Excellence
- 2017 Garvan–Olin Medal, American Chemical Society
- 2019 Royal Society of Chemistry Environment Prize
- 2025 L'Oréal-UNESCO For Women in Science Awards, Laureate for North America.
