= List of Iota Sigma Pi chapters =

Iota Sigma Pi an American honor society for women in the sciences, especially chemistry. It was created by the merger of three chemistry honor societies for women established in the early 20th century.

== History ==
Alchemi formed at the University of California in 1900, later opening chapters at the University of Southern California and Stanford University. In 1911, a chemistry honor society was established at the University of Washington. A third honor society, Iota Sigma Pi, was established at the University of Nebraska in 1912. The latter two societies merged as Iota Sigma Pi in 1913 and were joined by the three chapters of Alchmi in 1916.

== Chapters ==
Following is a list of Iota Sigma Pi chapters, with active chapters indicated in bold and inactive chapters in italics.

| Chapter | Charter date | Institution (former) | Location | Status | Ref. |
|---|---|---|---|---|---|
| Hydrogen | 1900 | University of California, Berkeley | Berkeley, California | Active | (Note: Formed from a chapter of Alchemi, a regional three-chapter honor society.) |
| Oxygen | 1911 | University of Washington | Seattle, Washington | Inactive | (Note: Chapter formed from a local chemistry honor sorority.) |
| Nitrogen | 1912 | University of Nebraska–Lincoln | Lincoln, Nebraska | Inactive | |
| Carbon | 1913 | Stanford University | Stanford, California | Inactive | |
| Sulfur | 1914 | University of Southern California | Southern California | Inactive | |
| Phosphorous | 1917 | University of Michigan | Ann Arbor, Michigan | Inactive | (Note: Non-standard spelling for Phosphorus used, see overall ref) |
| Tungsten | 1918–1970 | University of Colorado Boulder | Boulder, Colorado | Inactive | |
| Iodine | 1918 | University of Illinois Urbana-Champaign | East Central Illinois | Inactive | |
| Aurum | 1920–1993 | Iowa State University | Ames, Iowa | Inactive | |
| Ytterbium | 1920 | Yale University | New Haven, Connecticut | Inactive | |
| Helium | 1921 | University of Oklahoma | Norman, Oklahoma | Inactive | |
| **Mercury** | 1923 | University of Minnesota | Minneapolis and Saint Paul, Minnesota | Active | |
| **Radium** | May 26, 1923 | University of Cincinnati | Cincinnati, Ohio | Active | (Note: Chapter formed from Sigma Kappa, a local organization for women chemistry majors that was established in 1921.) |
| Platinum | 1924 | University of Denver | Denver, Colorado | Inactive | |
| Kalium | 1924 | University of Kansas | Lawrence, Kansas | Inactive | |
| **Fluorine** | 1925 | Western Reserve University | Cleveland, Ohio | Active | |
| Iridium | 1926 | University of Iowa | Iowa City, Iowa | Inactive | |
| **Indium** | 1930 | Indiana University Bloomington | Bloomington, Indiana | Active | |
| Palladium | 1930 | Pennsylvania State University | University Park, Pennsylvania | Inactive | |
| Tellurium | 1930 | University of Texas at Austin | Austin, Texas | Inactive | |
| Polonium | 1937 | George Washington University | Washington D.C. | Inactive | |
| **Aurum Iodide** | 1939 | | Chicago, Illinois | Active | (Note: Chapter was formed for Chicago alumnae.) |
| Uranium | 1947 | Texas State University | Denton, Texas | Inactive | |
| Columbium | 1947 | Columbia University | New York City, New York | Inactive | |
| **Chlorine** | 1949 | Louisiana State University | Baton Rouge, Louisiana | Active | |
| Manganese | 1951 | Hunter College | New York City, New York | Inactive | |
| Niobium | 1960 | Oregon State University | Corvallis, Oregon | Inactive | |
| Osmium | 1963 | Ohio State University | Columbus, Ohio | Active | |
| **Plutonium** | 1963 | Purdue University | West Lafayette, Indiana | Active | (Note: Marian College was affiliated with Plutonium until May 1971 when it split off as Cobalt.) |
| **Vanadium** | 1965 | Fordham University | New York City, New York | Active | |
| Neptunium | 1966 | University of Houston | Houston, Texas | Inactive | |
| Cobalt | 1971 | Marian College | Indianapolis, Indiana | Inactive | |
| Curium | 1973 | | Washington, D.C. | Inactive | |
| Ruthenium | 1974 | Rutgers University–New Brunswick | New Brunswick, New Jersey | Inactive | |
| Samarium | 1978 | | South Bend, Indiana | Inactive | |
| **Argentum** | 1979 | Mary Baldwin College | Staunton, Virginia | Active | |
| Promethium | 1979 | | Portland, Oregon | Inactive | |
| Molybdenum | 1981 | | Boston, Massachusetts | Inactive | |
| Technetium | 1987 | | Rochester, New York | Inactive | |
| Scandium | 1989 | Furman University | Greenville, South Carolina | Inactive | |
| **Lanthanum** | 1998 | Randolph College, Sweet Briar College, and University of Lynchburg | Lynchburg, Virginia | Active | |
| Cadmium | 2004 | | Albany, New York | Inactive | |
| **Einsteinium** | 2004 | | Tulsa Oklahoma | Active | |
| **Calcium** | 2005 | | Southern California | Active | |
| **Iron** | November 16, 2011 | | Greensboro, North Carolina | Active | |
| **Meitnerium** | 2020 | | Denver and Fort Collins, Colorado | Active | |
| **Protactinium** | February 7, 2025 | | Lehigh Valley, Pennsylvania | Active | |
| | | Hillsdale College | Hillsdale, Michigan | Active | |
| | | New York University | New York City, New York | Active | |
| | | Macalester College | Saint Paul, Minnesota | Active | |
| | | University at Buffalo | Buffalo, New York | Active | |
| **Members-at-Large** | | | | Active | |
