= Gertrude Perlmann =

Biochemist and structural biologist

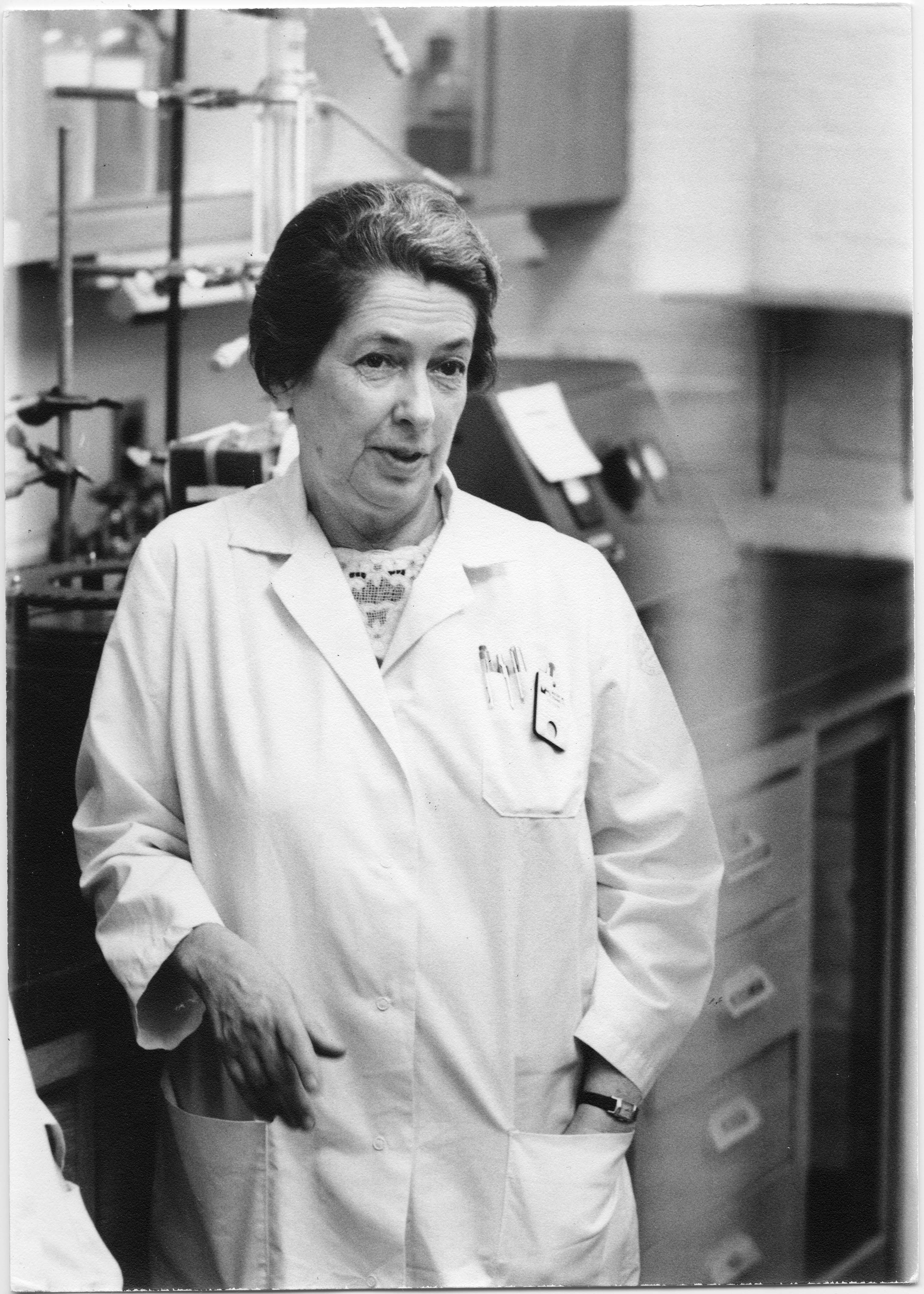
Gertrude Perlmann at The Rockefeller University

Gertrude Erika Perlmann (April 20, 1912 – September 9, 1974) was an Austro-Hungarian Empire-born U.S. biochemist and structural biologist. She is known for her work in protein chemistry, particularly her discoveries on the biology of phosphoproteins and the structure and action of pepsin and pepsinogen.

== Early life ==
Perlmann was born on April 20, 1912, in Liberec (Reichenberg), Austro-Hungarian Empire to a Jewish family.

== Education ==
She earned a doctorate in chemistry and physics at the German University of Prague in 1936. She fled Nazi occupation of Czechoslovakia for Denmark in 1936. She continued her postdoctoral training in Copenhagen at the Biological Institute of the Carlsberg Laboratory with Dr. Fritz Lipmann and Prof. K. Linderstrom-Lang until 1939.

== Career ==
At the beginning of World War II, she emigrated to the United States. She continued her research at Harvard Medical School from 1939 to 1946 and then at Massachusetts General Hospital in Boston, Massachusetts. She moved to the Rockefeller Institute in New York City as a Commonwealth Fund Fellow in 1946. She was a member of the faculty for 28 years, rising to the rank of Professor. During her time at the Rockefeller Institute, she collaborated with the notable microbiologist Rebecca Lancefield.

== Awards ==
In the 1960s she was awarded the Silver Medal of the Chemical Society and the Legion of Honor by the French. She was one of the first female corresponding members of the Académie des Sciences. She won the Garvan–Olin Medal in 1965 from the American Chemical Society for "distinguished service to chemistry," for her research on the structure of pepsin, an enzyme that hastens food digestion. She was also awarded the French Order of Merit in 1974.

== Scientific societies ==
Perlmann was a member of the American Chemical Society, the American Society of Biological Chemists, the Biophysical Society, the British Biochemical Society and the Harvey Society.

== Personal life ==
Perlmann is a member of a prominent scientific family. She was the sister of biochemist Peter Perlmann, who together with Eva Engvall invented the enzyme-linked immunosorbent assay (ELISA) at Stockholm University in 1971. Her nephew Thomas Perlmann is a professor at the Karolinska Institutet known for his work on the specification and maintenance of dopamine neurons in the brain, and who is also the Secretary General of the Nobel Committee for Physiology or Medicine.

== Death ==
She died of cancer at New York Hospital on September 9, 1974.

== Selected publications ==
- Ong, E. B. & Perlmann, G. E. (1968). "The amino-terminal sequence of porcine pepsinogen". J. Biol. Chem. 243 (23): 6104–6109. doi:10.1016/S0021-9258(18)94466-2. PMID 4881358.
- Ong, E. B. & Perlmann, G. E. (1967). "Specific inactivation of pepsin by benzyloxycarbonyl-L-phenylalanyldiazomethane". Nature. 215 (5109): 1492–1494. Bibcode:1967Natur.215.1492O. doi:10.1038/2151492b0. PMID 4861199. S2CID 4151576.
- Blumenfeld, O. O. & Perlmann, G. E. (1959). "The amino acid composition of crystalline pepsin". J. Gen. Physiol. 42 (3): 553–561. doi:10.1085/jgp.42.3.553. PMC 2194931. PMID 13620885.
- Perlmann, G. E. (1954). "Phosphorus linkages in alpha-casein". Nature. 174 (4423): 273–274. Bibcode:1954Natur.174..273P. doi:10.1038/174273a0. PMID 13185289. S2CID 4185268.
- Perlmann, G. E. (1954). "Formation of enzymatically active, dialysable fragments during autodigestion of pepsin". Nature. 173 (4400): 406. Bibcode:1954Natur.173..406P. doi:10.1038/173406a0. PMID 13144771.
- Perlmann, G. E. (1948). "Electrophoretic behavior of modified ovalbumins". Nature. 161 (4097): 720–721. Bibcode:1948Natur.161..720P. doi:10.1038/161720b0. PMID 18938845. S2CID 24606108.
