= Ines Mandl =

Austrian-born American biochemist

- fair use image only
- Born: 1917; Vienna
- Died: 2016 (aged 98–99)
- Education: University College Cork; Polytechnic Institute
- Awards: Garvan-Olin Medal
- Scientific career
- Fields: biochemistry
- Workplaces: Columbia University

Ines Mandl (April 4, 1917 – August 5, 2016) was an Austrian-born American biochemist who was awarded the Garvan-Olin Medal in 1983 for her work on the enzyme collagenase. She was a professor at Columbia University.

== Early life and education ==
Ines Hochmuth was born in 1917, in Vienna, the only child of Ernst and Ida (née Bassan) Hochmuth. She completed elementary and secondary school in Austria, then married one of her father's colleagues, Hans Mandl, and moved to London. In Ireland during World War II, she earned a diploma in chemical technology from University College Cork.

After the war, she pursued graduate education in chemistry in the United States, earning a master's degree in 1947 and completing doctoral studies in 1949, at the Polytechnic Institute in Brooklyn (now New York University Tandon School of Engineering).

She was one of the last students of Carl Neuberg, the "Father of Biochemistry."

== Career ==
Ines Mandl accepted a job in the surgery department at Columbia University after finishing her PhD in 1949, and stayed at Columbia for the rest of her career. In 1950, she became the first scientist to extract collagenase from the bacterium Clostridium histolyticum. Other work involved the study of respiratory distress in newborns, and the biochemistry of pulmonary emphysema. She held a teaching appointment in microbiology, and co-authored more than 140 academic publications.

In 1972, Mandl founded an academic journal in her field, Connective Tissue Research; she was editor of the journal from its first issue until her retirement in 1986.

Her work was recognized in 1977 with the Carl Neuberg Medal from the American Society of European Chemists and Pharmacists, and in 1983 with the Garvan Medal from the American Chemical Society. She was also awarded the Austrian Cross of Honour for Science and Art, was elected to the American Academy of Arts and Sciences, and the New York Academy of Sciences.

== Legacy ==
Ines Mandl made a substantial endowment to her alma mater, New York University Tandon School of Engineering, for undergraduate scholarships and graduate fellowships in chemical engineering and biological sciences. In recent decades, collagenase has begun to find various practical medical applications.

The Ines Mandl Medical Foundation of Budapest held an award competition in celebration of Mandl's 90th birthday in 2007.
