= Katharine Bishop =

American anatomist, physician and histologist

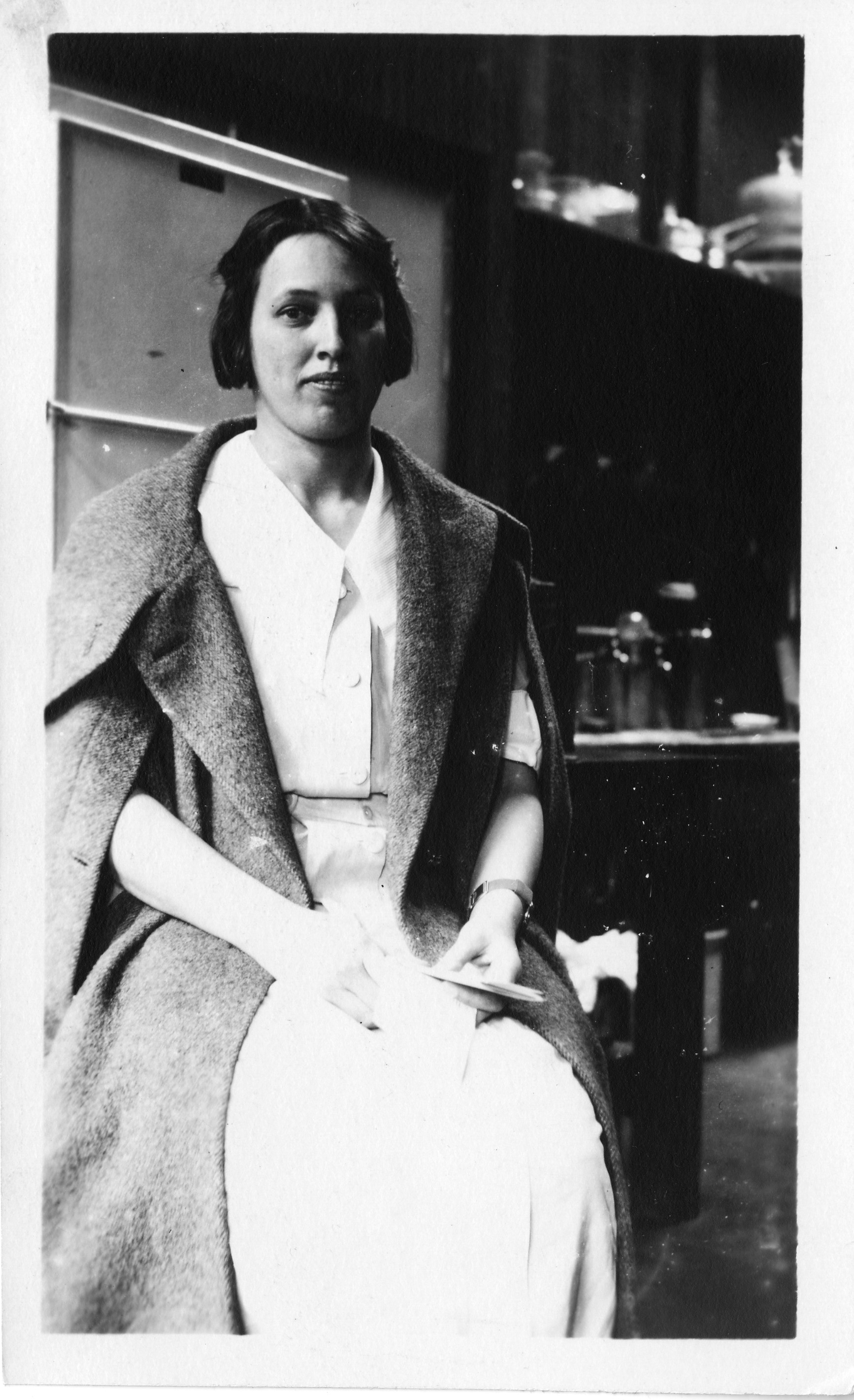
- Born: Katharine Julia Scott Bishop; June 23, 1889; New York, United States of America
- Died: September 20, 1975 (aged 86); Berkeley, United States of America
- Other name: Katharine Scott
- Education: Wellesley College, Radcliffe College, The Johns Hopkins University School of Medicine,
- Spouse: Tyndall Bishop
- Scientific career
- Fields: Anatomist, Medical Physician, Researcher, Educator

Katharine Julia Scott Bishop (June 23, 1889 – September 20, 1975) was a trained anatomist, medical physician, researcher and educator best known for co-discovering Vitamin E.

== Early life ==
In 1889, Bishop was born in New York as Katharine Scott, to Walter and Katherine Emma (Campbell) Scott. She attended the Somerville High School (Massachusetts) for high school and later received her undergraduate degree from Wellesley College in 1910. After taking premedical courses at Radcliffe College, Bishop went on to graduate from The Johns Hopkins University School of Medicine and earned her medical degree in 1915.

== Discovery of Vitamin E ==
After graduating from medical school, Bishop moved to Berkeley to teach histology in the anatomy department at the University of California Medical School until 1923. During this time, Bishop did her medical research with anatomist and endocrinologist Herbert McLean Evans. Together, they published a monograph on the vital staining of connective tissue cells. The discovery of Vitamin E came as a result of the study of the reproductive cycle of rats. After establishing a standard diet for the rats to maintain their regular reproductive cycle, Bishop and Evans started experimenting with dietary deficiencies. In 1923, they found a previously unknown factor that is vital for reproduction. When the rats were fed with a diet where lard was the only source of fat, though they grew healthily, the female rats were unable to carry babies full term due to the breakdown of the placentas, and the male rats became sterile since the sperm-forming cells in the testes would deteriorate. Initially called "Factor X", Bishop and Evans narrowed down that this factor came from the lipid extract of lettuce and wheat germ. The name "Vitamin E" later came after Vitamin D.

== Later life ==
From 1924 to 1929, Bishop worked as a histopathologist at the George Williams Hooper Foundation for Medical Research in San Francisco. After her marriage and birth of her two daughters, she spent two years studying public health at the University of California Medical School. In mid-1930s, Bishop became a practicing physician and anesthesiologist at St. Luke's Hospital in San Francisco. She accepted a position at Alta Bates Hospital in Berkeley, California in 1940, and worked there until her retirement in 1953. She died at home in Berkeley in 1975.

== Publications ==
- with Evans, Herbert Mclean - On the existence of a hitherto unknown dietary factor essential for reproduction, Science n.s. 56:650-51
- with Evans, Herbert Mclean - On the relations between fertility and nutrition IV. The production of sterility with nutritional regimes adequate for growth and its cure with other foodstuffs. Journal of Metabolic Research, 3:233-316
- with Evans, Herbert Mclean - Existence of a hitherto unknown dietary factor essential for reproduction, J. Am. Med. Assoc., 81: 899-92
- with Evans, Herbert Mclean - On an invariable and characteristic disturbance of reproductive function in animals reared on a diet poor in fat and soluble vitamin A, Anat. Record, 23:18-19
- with Evans, Herbert Mclean - On the differential reactions to vital dyes exhibited by the two great groups of connective-tissue cells. Carnegie. Inst. Wash. Contrib. Embryology. 10(47):1-5

== See also ==
- Herbert McLean Evans
- Physicians
- University of California San Francisco
