= Carol J. Burns =

American chemist

Carol Jean Burns
- Education: University of California, Berkeley; Rice University
- Scientific career
- Workplaces: Lawrence Berkeley National Laboratory; Los Alamos National Laboratory
- Thesis: The coordination chemistry of divalent bis(pentamethylcyclopentadienyl)lanthanide complexes with non-classical ligands (1987)

Carol Jean Burns is an American chemist who is deputy director of Research at Lawrence Berkeley National Laboratory. Her research is in actinide coordination and organometallic chemistry. She spent a term at the White House Office of Science and Technology Policy, and is a Fellow of the American Chemical Society. She was awarded the American Chemical Society Garvan–Olin Medal in 2021.

== Early life and education ==
Burns earned her undergraduate degree at Rice University, where she majored in chemistry. She moved to the University of California, Berkeley for graduate studies, where she was a Hertz Foundation Fellow. Her research considered divalent lanthanide complexes with non-classical ligands. After completing her doctorate, Burns joined Los Alamos National Laboratory as a J. Robert Oppenheimer postdoctoral fellow.

== Research and career ==
Burns was eventually appointed a laboratory fellow at the Los Alamos National Laboratory, where she developed a new class of high-valency uranium compounds which contain metal-ligand multiple bonds. In 2003 she left Los Alamos to work as a policy analyst for the Office of Science and Technology Policy. Whilst at the OSTP, Burns worked on defence infrastructure and threat preparedness. Specifically, she developed the Nuclear Defence Roadmap.

In 2004, Burns returned to Los Alamos National Laboratory, where she was made head of the chemistry division. She oversaw a group of researchers who could analyze debris and identify the people responsible for terrorist attacks. She has served as a mentor for early career researchers, and was awarded the LANL Women's Career Development Mentoring Award. She was elected Fellow of the American Association for the Advancement of Science. She is a member of the board of directors of the California Council on Science and Technology.

In 2021, Burns was awarded the Garvan–Olin Medal of the American Chemical Society. Later that year she was made deputy director at the Lawrence Berkeley National Laboratory.

== Selected publications ==
- Stosh A Kozimor; Ping Yang; Enrique R Batista; et al. (1 September 2009). "Trends in covalency for d- and f-element metallocene dichlorides identified using chlorine K-edge X-ray absorption spectroscopy and time-dependent density functional theory". Journal of the American Chemical Society. 131 (34): 12125–12136. doi:10.1021/ja9015759. ISSN 0002-7863. PMID 19705913. Wikidata Q46298049.
- Arney, David S. J.; Burns, Carol J. (1995). "Synthesis and Properties of High-Valent Organouranium Complexes Containing Terminal Organoimido and Oxo Functional Groups. A New Class of Organo-f-Element Complexes". Journal of the American Chemical Society. 117 (37): 9448–9460. Bibcode:1995JAChS.117.9448A. doi:10.1021/ja00142a011. ISSN 0002-7863.
- Arney, David S. J.; Burns, Carol J. (1993). "Synthesis and structure of high-valent organouranium complexes containing terminal monooxo functional groups". Journal of the American Chemical Society. 115 (21): 9840–9841. Bibcode:1993JAChS.115.9840A. doi:10.1021/ja00074a077. ISSN 0002-7863.
