= Betty Sullivan =

American biochemist (1902–1999)

Betty Julia Sullivan
- Born: May 31, 1902
- Died: December 25, 1999 (aged 97)
- Education: University of Paris, Pasteur Institute
- Awards: Osbourne Medal (1948), Garvan–Olin Medal (1954)
- Scientific career
- Fields: Food chemistry
- Workplaces: Russell Miller Milling Company, Experience Inc.

Betty Julia Sullivan (31 May 1902 — 25 December 1999) was an American biochemist between the 1920s and 1940s at Russell Miller Milling Company. In 1947, Sullivan began her executive career as research director and vice-president for Russell Miller until the company became part of Peavey Company in 1958. After the merger, Sullivan remained in her executive roles before leaving in 1967 to co-start an agribusiness consulting company. While working at Experience Inc., Sullivan became director of the company in 1975 and retired in 1992. During her career, Sullivan was the first woman to receive the Osbourne Medal from the American Association of Cereal Chemists, in 1948. In 1954, Sullivan was awarded the Garvan–Olin Medal from the American Chemical Society.

== Early life and education ==
On May 31, 1902, Sullivan was born in Minneapolis, Minnesota. Sullivan attended the University of Minnesota for her Bachelor of Science in 1922. She is of Irish ancestry. In the mid-1920s, Sullivan left the United States and completed a master's degree at the University of Paris in 1925. The following year, she conducted research at the Pasteur Institute in 1926. In 1935, Sullivan returned to the University of Minnesota for a Doctor of Philosophy in biochemistry and a minor degree in organic chemistry. Sullivan wrote her Bachelor of Science thesis on the chemical reactions in pinene and her PhD thesis about the lipids found in wheat.

== Career ==
In 1922, Sullivan started her chemistry career as a lab assistant for the Russell Miller Milling Company in 1922. While at Russell Miller, Sullivan was promoted to head chemist in 1927 and research director in 1947. While researching the food chemistry of wheat and flour, Sullivan simultaneously held the position of vice-president. After Russell Miller became a part of Peavey Company in 1958, Sullivan continued her research and executive positions with Peavey while worked in food processing to create new products. When Sullivan left Peavey in 1967, she co-created an agribusiness consulting company called Experience Inc. During her time with Experience Inc. Sullivan held various positions including president in 1969 and director in 1975 before her 1992 retirement.

== Awards and honors ==
In 1948, Sullivan became the first woman to be awarded the Osbourne Medal by the American Association of Cereal Chemists. Sullivan was also awarded the Garvan–Olin Medal in 1954 by the American Chemical Society.

== Death ==
On 25 December 1999, Sullivan died in Bloomington, Minnesota.
