= Glenola Rose =

American chemist

Glenola Behling Rose
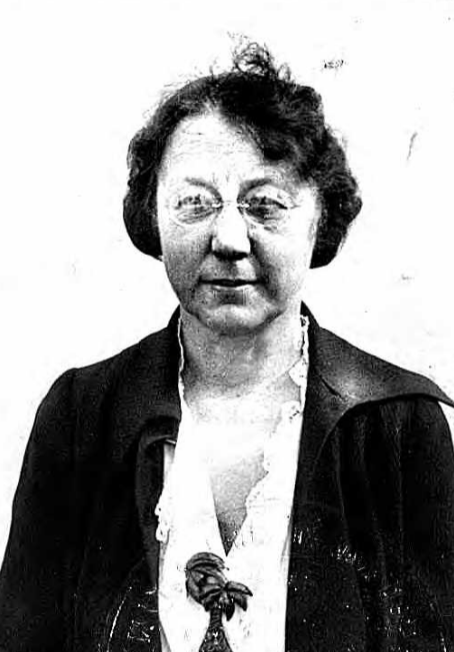
- Glenola Behling Rose, from a Brazilian immigration card in 1948
- Born: Glenola Emily Behling; March 6, 1891; Buffalo, New York
- Died: June 20, 1970; Salem County, New Jersey
- Occupation: Chemist

Glenola Emily Behling Rose (March 6, 1891 – June 20, 1970) was an American chemist known for her work during the 1920s and 1930s on women's employment in chemistry. She ran the Women's Service Committee of the American Chemical Society, which she co-founded in 1926.

== Early life and education ==
Glenola Behling was born in Buffalo, New York, the daughter of Charles Ernst Behling and Anna Beitz Behling. She graduated from Masten Park High School in Buffalo in 1908, and earned a bachelor's degree from the University of Chicago in 1913. She pursued further studies at the University of Michigan, where she completed a master's degree in chemistry. She completed doctoral studies in chemistry at the University of Washington in 1915, with a dissertation titled "The isolation of inorganic compounds with special reference to the green salts of cobalt."

== Career ==
Rose worked in the Dyestuffs Technical Laboratory at DuPont from 1918 to 1935. In 1921, she presented Marie Curie with an honorary membership in Iota Sigma Pi. In the early 1920s, she served on a committee on women in chemistry for the American Association of University Women and the Bureau of Vocational Information. She ran the Women's Service Committee of the American Chemical Society, which she co-founded in 1926. She also spoke to community women's organizations about her work.

Rose was president of the Wilmington Business and Professional Women's Club in 1923. She and her husband traveled extensively, and photographed the wildflowers of New Jersey; she shared travel films and slide presentations on both subjects with community organizations. In 1952 she studied public health and education in Puerto Rico.

== Personal life ==
In 1915, Glenola Behling married fellow chemist Robert Evstafieff Rose, a British subject born in Italy. Her husband died in 1946, and she died in Salem County, New Jersey, in 1970, aged 79 years.
