= Elizabeth C. Theil =

American biochemist

Elizabeth C. Theil is an American biochemist who worked on iron biology. She became the first woman to be appointed to a chaired professorship at North Carolina State University, in 1988; in the same year she received the O. Max Gardner Award of the University of North Carolina.

Theil earned her B.A. from Cornell University in 1957 and her Ph.D. from Columbia University in 1962. She joined the NCSU faculty in 1971, where she is currently Professor Emeritus, and in 1998 moved to the Children's Hospital Oakland Research Institute where she is Senior Scientist Emeritus; in 2004 she was also appointed adjunct professor at the University of California, Berkeley, retiring in 2010.

Theil's Research Group discovered that iron directly binds ferritin mRNA to regulate ferritin protein biosynthesis^{[1]}, that iron enters ferritin protein though ion channels and pores similar to those in cell membranes, and that ferritin iron, abundant in legumes, can be absorbed intact, with the potential to ameliorate iron deficiency anemia, a disease identified 500 years ago and impacting 30% of the world’s population in 2015.

== Publications ==
- Ma, J; Haldar, S; Khan, MA; Sharma, SD; Merrick, WC; Theil, EC; Goss, DJ (2012). "Fe2+ binds iron responsive element-RNA, selectively changing protein-binding affinities and regulating mRNA repression and activation". Proc. Natl. Acad. Sci. U.S.A. 109 (22): 8417–22. doi:10.1073/pnas.1120045109. PMC 3365203. PMID 22586079.
- Behera, RK; Torres, R; Tosha, T; Bradley, JM; Goulding, CW; Theil, EC (2015). "Fe(2+) substrate transport through ferritin protein cage ion channels influences enzyme activity and biomineralization". J. Biol. Inorg. Chem. 20 (6): 957–69. doi:10.1007/s00775-015-1279-x. PMC 4634868. PMID 26202907.
- Tosha, T; Behera, RK; Ng, HL; Bhattasali, O; Alber, T; Theil, EC (2012). "Ferritin protein nanocage ion channels: gating by N-terminal extensions". J. Biol. Chem. 287 (16): 13016–25. doi:10.1074/jbc.M111.332734. PMC 3339931. PMID 22362775.
- Theil, EC (2011). "Iron homeostasis and nutritional iron deficiency". J. Nutr. 141 (4): 724S – 728S. doi:10.3945/jn.110.127639. PMC 3056584. PMID 21346101..
- Theil, EC (Mar 2012). "Ferritin protein nanocages—the story". Nanotechnol Perceptions. 8 (1): 7–16. doi:10.4024/N03TH12A.ntp.08.01. PMC 3816979. PMID 24198751.
