= Madeleine M. Joullié =

American chemist

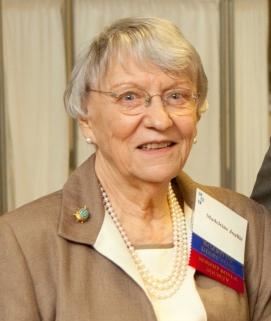
- Born: March 29, 1927 (age 99); Paris, France
- Education: Simmons College, University of Pennsylvania
- Spouse: Richard E. Prange
- Children: None
- Awards: Garvan–Olin Medal (1978); Edward Leete Award (2009); John Scott Medal (2015)
- Scientific career
- Fields: Organic chemistry
- Workplaces: University of Pennsylvania
- Doctoral advisor: Allan R. Day

Madeleine M. Joullié (born March 29, 1927) is an American-Brazilian organic chemist. She was the first woman to join the University of Pennsylvania chemistry faculty as well as the first female organic chemist to be appointed to a tenure track position in a major American university. She was one of the first affirmative action officers at the University of Pennsylvania. She has a distinguished record as a teacher of both undergraduate and graduate-level organic chemistry, and as a mentor of students.

Joullié is also an active researcher in organic chemistry who has published three textbooks of organic chemistry, more than 18 review articles, and more than 300 scientific papers. Her work in synthesizing organic compounds such as tilorone, furanomycin, and numerous cyclopeptides has led to the development of antibiotic and antiviral drugs. Joullié has received numerous awards, including the 1978 Garvan Medal from the American Chemical Society, in recognition of her accomplishments in teaching and research.

== Early life ==
Madeleine Joullié was born in Paris, France. Her father, an international businessman, soon moved to Rio de Janeiro, Brazil, where she attended the Lycée Français. The family also lived briefly in São Paulo. There she attended a private school, the Liceu Rio Branco.

Joullié moved to the United States to study in 1946. She obtained a B.S. degree in chemistry from Simmons College, a women's college in Boston, in 1949. Then she moved to Philadelphia, where she was the only full-time female graduate student in chemistry at the University of Pennsylvania. There weren't even bathrooms for women in the chemistry building. She earned an M.S. from the University of Pennsylvania in 1950 and a Ph.D. in 1953. She worked with Allan R. Day, who inspired Joullié as both a researcher and a teacher.

Also at the university, Joullié met Richard E. Prange (1932–2008), a condensed matter theorist in the physics department. They married in 1959.

== Career ==
In 1953, Madeleine Joullié joined the University of Pennsylvania chemistry faculty, the first woman to do so. Originally in a non-tenure-track position, Joullié taught undergraduate organic chemistry five days a week and ran the lab. In her first five years, none of the graduate students would work with her, so she carried out research in collaboration with undergraduates. As more women entered the department, first female and later male graduate students began to work with her.

Joullié received a Fulbright scholarship to lecture at the University of Brazil (1965). While there, she wrote a textbook in Portuguese on heterocyclic chemistry. She has also been a visiting professor at Columbia University (1968), CRNS (Grenoble, France, 1987), the University of California at Santa Barbara (1989), and Cambridge, England (1997), but the majority of her career has been spent at the University of Pennsylvania. Joullié became a full professor in 1974.

=== Community involvement ===
Joullié was active in the safety committee at UPenn, helping to identify and enforce safe work guidelines for the chemistry department.

In 1970, Joullié and Mildred Cohn worked on the Committee on the Status of Women, which gathered data and documented the second-class status of women at Penn. The percentage of women holding faculty positions was far below the percentage of qualified women Ph.D.'s, and those women who had positions held lower rank, received lower salaries, and waited longer for promotion. The committee developed affirmative action guidelines, supporting the university's efforts to recruit more women and minority faculty.

Later in the 1970s, dean Vartan Gregorian appointed her as one of the first affirmative action officers at the University of Pennsylvania. Between 1976 and 1980, Joullié reviewed the hiring and promotions processes of the School of Arts and Science, comparing resumes of male and female candidates. On some occasions, when she felt that qualified women had been ignored in the hiring process, she flatly refused to sign off on new hires. Her effectiveness in the position led Provost Eliot Stellar to appoint her as the chair of the university's Council for Equal Opportunity, overseeing affirmative action in all departments. Of her affirmative action activities, Joullié says:

"I served in that role for seven years, without help, extra pay, or teaching relief... It was not a pleasant job, but it did produce results. The School of Arts and Sciences was so successful with their affirmative action program that I was then asked by the provost to chair the Council for Equal Opportunity to oversee the affirmative action programs of all the schools at Penn."

Described by professor Helen Davies as "fearless and formidable", Joullié is credited as having played a key role in creating a culture of equality for women at the university. Joullié also helped the American Chemical Society to develop professional guidelines for chemists.

=== Scientific achievements ===
Early in her career, her Ph.D. advisor, Allan R. Day, interested her in heterocyclic compounds, and she did early work with aromatic and heterocyclic scaffolds and fluorinated heterocycles. She also did significant research on heterocyclic ketones in the 1970s, collaborating with Peter Yates of the University of Toronto, and receiving the 1972 ACS Philadelphia Section Award. In the early 1970s, she successfully synthesized tilorone, an interferon inducer which helps to protect cells.

Since then, much of Joullié's research has focused on the synthesis of natural products. In 1980, she reported the first asymmetric total synthesis of the antibiotic (+)-furanomycin, the first use of the Ugi 4CC in the synthesis of a non-proteinogenic amino acid. She helped to develop methodologies for aromatic substitution, and introduced the term "chirality transfer". Her subsequent work has led to the total synthesis of several natural products, including muscarine, geiparvarin, ascofuranone, furanomycin, and dihydromauritine A.

Working with Judah Folkman at Harvard Medical School and Paul B. Weisz at the University of Pennsylvania, Joullié helped to synthesize beta-cyclodextrin sulfate, a ring-shaped sugar molecule that attaches to the walls of growing blood vessels. By capturing and delivering cortisone molecules, it decreases the growth of new capillaries. Chemotherapies can thus target aberrant angiogenesis, the growth of new blood vessels, and restrict the growth of malignant tumours. Joullié's specialized compounds made Folkman's original treatments 100 to 1000 times more potent. Beta-cyclodextrin sulfate is also useful in limiting restenosis, growth of cells on artery walls that can lead to blockages at the site of surgical procedures.

Another particularly interesting area of research has involved the Didemnin class of macrocyclic depsipeptide. Derived from a marine tunicate of the family Didemnidae, didemnins exhibit antitumor, antiviral and immunosuppressive qualities. Joullié's asymmetric total synthesis of didemnin B in 1990 was a landmark event leading to fundamental contributions to both the chemistry and biology of this intriguing class of natural products. Didemnin B was the first marine natural product to be used in clinical trials against cancer. Joullié has produced several didemnin analogs. She has also developed probe molecules that can trace didemnins, allowing researchers to more effectively study their biological activities.

Another area of research has been ninhydrin analogs. Joullié's lab has developed compounds with enhanced chromogenic and fluorogenic properties, useful in fingerprinting and forensic science. Joullié was asked by the United States Secret Service to help in developing fingerprint reagents. Fingerprint chemicals must be non-toxic and can't damage sensitive evidence, as well as meeting other criteria. Joullié, with students Olga Petrovskaia and Diane Hauze, developed and patented a class of compounds called indanediones. Like ninhydrins, indanediones react with amino acids from the oil on people's fingertips. They have the advantages of being cheaper to produce, easier to use, and more sensitive, providing more clarity and sharper contrast. Indanediones are standardly used in the first stage of forensic identification of latent fingerprints.

== Awards ==
Madeleine M. Joullié has received a substantial number of awards, including the following:

- John Scott Medal (2015)
- Edward Leete Award (2009)
- Arthur C. Cope Senior Scholar Award (2002) from the American Chemical Society
- Distinguished Achievement Award University of Pennsylvania Graduate Student Associate and Phi Lambda Upsilon (1999)
- ACS Award for Encouraging Women into Careers in the Chemical Sciences (1998)
- H. Martin Friedmann Lectureship, Rutgers University (1995)
- Henry Hill Award (1994)
- Philadelphia Organic Chemist's Club Award (1994)
- Second Annual Association of American Women in Science, Philadelphia Chapter Award (1991)
- Lindback Award for Distinguished Teaching (1991)
- American Institute of Chemists 34th Annual Scroll Award (1988)
- American Cyanamid Faculty Award (1984)
- Garvan Medal (1978)
