= Dresselhaus =

Dresselhaus is a surname. Notable people with the surname include:

- Gene Dresselhaus (1929–2021), American solid-state physicist

- Dresselhaus effect, a case of spin-orbit coupling in crystalline solids

- Mildred Dresselhaus (née Spiewak; 1930–2017), American physicist, carbon nanomaterials, spouse of Gene
