= Paul B. Weisz =

American physicist and chemist (1919–2012)

Paul Burgan Weisz
- Born: July 2, 1919
- Died: September 25, 2012 (aged 93)
- Education: Auburn University
- Scientific career
- Fields: Chemistry

Paul Burgan Weisz (July 2, 1919 – September 25, 2012) was a Czechoslovak-born American chemist, noted for his work on solid catalysts, which had a major impact on petroleum refining.

== Life ==
Weisz was born July 2, 1919, in Plzeň, Czechoslovakia, the son of Alexander and Amalia Weisz. They moved to Berlin and finally emigrated to the United States in 1939. He married and was survived by his wife, Rhoda, his son, Randy, and his daughter, Ingrid. He died on September 25, 2012, in State College, Pennsylvania.

== Education ==
Weisz studied physics at the Technische Hochschule in Charlottenburg (now Technische Universität Berlin) and then at the Alabama Polytechnic Institute, where he received a B.S. degree in 1940. He took a sabbatical from work and gained a doctorate at ETH Zurich in 1966.

== Work ==
Weisz produced 91 US patents and more than 180 papers, many related to diffusion behavior, which he applied to solid catalysts, dyeing, and the movement of chemicals in cells.

=== Early career ===
While studying in Berlin, he also worked on Geiger counter instrumentation and cosmic ray measurements at the Institute of Cosmic Radiation Research. After graduating in the US, he carried out further work in these fields at the Bartol Research Foundation of the Franklin Institute and was seconded to MIT to help develop a long-range radio navigation system, LORAN. He also taught part-time at Swarthmore College.

=== Mobil ===
In 1946, he joined Mobil as a Research Assistant, turning his attention to diffusion and catalysis, eventually rising to become Manager of the Central Research Laboratory, and staying there until his retirement in 1984. It was there that he carried out the work which made him most famous. The development of shape-selective catalysts revolutionized many petroleum refining and chemical processes. A 1960 paper, "Intracrystalline and Molecular-Shape-Selective Catalysis by Zeolite Salts", coauthored with Vince Frilette, a Mobil colleague, became the foundation of shape-selective catalysis (which accelerated certain chemical reactions, but only for molecules of particular shape) and one of his most widely cited papers. Processes based on this and subsequent work were first commercialized in the early 1960s.

The company permitted him a sabbatical period from 1964 to 1966 at ETH Zurich, where he earned a doctorate, setting the foundation for some of the fundamental laws of diffusion in dyeing.

=== Academic career ===
From 1974 to 1976, he was a visiting professor at Princeton University. From 1983 on, he was a distinguished professor of chemical and bio-engineering at the University of Pennsylvania. Since 1993, he has been an adjunct professor in chemical engineering at Pennsylvania State University. In this period, he applied chemical and physical principles to biomedical research, including work with Madeleine M. Joullié on the synthesis of a molecule equivalent to heparin which avoided the dangerous side-effects of the natural molecule.

== Honors ==
- 1972 E. V. Murphree Award in Industrial and Engineering Chemistry, American Chemical Society
- 1974 Pioneer Award, American Institute of Chemists
- 1977 Leo Friend Award, American Chemical Society
- 1977 Elected member, US National Academy of Engineering for “Contributions in pioneering the use of molecular sieves as cracking catalysts for petroleum hydrocarbons.”
- 1978 R. H. Wilhelm Award, American Institute of Chemical Engineers
- 1980 Honorary Doctorate (ScD, technological science), ETH Zurich
- 1983 Lavoisier Medal, Société Chimique de France
- 1983 Langmuir Distinguished Lecturer Award, American Chemical Society
- 1985 Perkin Medal, Society of Chemical Industry
- 1986 Chemistry of Contemporary Technological Problems Award, American Chemical Society
- 1987 Carothers Award, American Chemical Society
- 1988 DGKM Kollegium Award (Germany)
- 1992 US National Medal of Technology and Innovation "For his basic discoveries and management in the field of zeolite catalysis, in conjunction with his colleagues at Mobil Corporation, leading to chemical and petroleum technologies now producing products valued at billions of dollars per year."

== See also ==
- Weisz–Prater criterion
