= Regina Olson Hughes =

American scientific illustrator

- Hughes, c. 1980
- Born: February 1, 1895; Herman, Nebraska
- Died: August 12, 1993 (aged 98)
- Education: Gallaudet College
- Occupation: Illustrator Translator
- Employer: US Department of Agriculture Smithsonian Museum

Regina Olson Hughes (1895–1993) was an American scientific illustrator in Botanical Art. Born February 1, 1895, in Herman, Nebraska, she became fascinated with the world of plants and flowers. Her parents were Gilbert and Johanna (Sullivan) Olson. At age 10, she contracted scarlet fever and her hearing slowly diminished until she became fully deaf at age 14. In order for her to communicate with her peers, she relied on lip reading and written notes for business work. Hughes retained her speech skills and continued to speak fluently throughout her adulthood. She became proficient in American Sign Language when she enrolled in Gallaudet University.

She loved her rural home, rampant with weeds, plants and flowers. An interest in art also dominated her childhood. Her parents provided art tutoring. Plants and flowers were her favorite subjects. In 1923, Hughes married Frederick H. Hughes and lived on Gallaudet University's campus for thirty years. He was Gallaudet's legendary Deaf economics professor, theater enthusiast, and football coach. In 1956, he died of a heart attack. She died August 12, 1993, due to heart failure at age 98.

== Education ==
Hughes attended Gallaudet College, the then only postsecondary program for deaf students. She said, “In 1918, when I graduated from Gallaudet, deaf people were looked down upon. We were treated like children.” But she never backed down from a challenge. At Gallaudet she proved her gift as a writer and poet, contributing many poems to the college's newspaper, Buff and Blue. After she graduated, she called on Nebraska senator Filbert Hichcock, founder of Omaha World Herald and friend of her father, and asked if he could help her find a political job. He told her, “nice girls don’t work. You go home and stay with your papa and meet a nice man and he'll take care of you.” She was notably unimpressed with this advice. She received her bachelor's in art in 1918 and her master's degree in 1920.

== Government work ==
After graduation, Hughes worked at the Veterans Administration for a few weeks before moving on to the state department. In 1930, Hughes worked at the US Department of Agriculture as a research clerk then as a scientific illustrator and translator. She attained stature as an artist and scholar during years of government service. She used her fluency in French, Spanish, Portuguese, and Italian to work as a translator in the State department during World War I. After the armistice, Hughes continued her service at the Departments of War and Commerce where her most prestigious assignment was to translate during the Washington Conference on the Limitation of Armament. She served as a translator for the US Department of State, one of only two non-French women employed by the US office of Translation.

In 1936, she became the scientific illustrator in botany for the Agricultural Research Service. Hughes’ experiences has included years of honored illustration work for the Agricultural Research Service and the US Department of Agriculture. Then in 1969, she “retired” from the USDA but then continued work for the Smithsonian Institution. She continued to work until the age of 95, when the Botany Department of the Smithsonian Institution gave a retirement part in her honor.

=== Other work ===
Hughes worked at the Smithsonian until 1990 but did side work as well. She taught at the Mississippi school for the deaf. She painted orchids and bromeliads for Robert W. Read, Curator in the Smithsonian Department of Botany, and continuing as a contract illustrator for scientists at both the USDA and the Smithsonian. Robert Reed was very impressed by her work and continued to work together for 17 years. She has also been a resident illustrator in the Department of Botany at the Smithsonian Institution. Her interest in art and language generated thick sketchbooks. Most of her paintings, as well as many flower studies are based on sketches made during her travels throughout much of the world. In 1979 the Smithsonian Institution honored her by naming a new species, of Bromeliad, "Billbergia reginae," for Regina Olson Hughes. She is the only deaf person to have both a plant genus and species named for her. In 1981, Robert M. King and Harold Robinson, named a member of the Asteraceae after her "Hughesia reginae."

== Illustrations ==
Hughes was a botanical artist and focused on plants, particularly orchids. Her illustrations include a variety of skills such as watercolor, oils, gouache and pencil. To be an effective botanical illustrator, one has to be intelligent, patient, knowledgeable, aesthetic and naturally artistic. Art history books, generally, do not include scientific illustration, which has been long considered more technical, utilitarian, or even distinguished craftsmanship rather than a means of artistic self-expression. The necessity of executing accurate images of natural plans and flowers requires explicit replication of the object, thus eliminating personal input by the illustrator. She was known for her beautiful, precise and intricate depictions of weeds, orchids, and exotic species. Her lived combination of arts and sciences emanated from her passion. Much of her work is so detailed that it has been done with the aid of a microscope. Hughes was primarily self-educated botany, working closely with taxonomists and other scientists as she illustrated the flowers, weeds, plants, and seeds they collected and categorized from all over the world. For all of these illustrations she wrote the plant descriptions There are no backgrounds to distract the scientists from the main subject of the work. Colors are held to a minimum to avoid interference with the subject. Similar parts of the plant might be shown in different levels of details. Distortotion is frequently seen in Hughes' works in order to show the important parts. Plants and flowers parts must show exact proportions in a corresponding scale.

=== Published work and art shows ===
She was the first deaf artist to have a solo show at the Smithsonian; 40 meticulous watercolors of orchids were exhibited in the Rotunda Gallery of the Smithsonian's National Museum of Natural History in 1982: “Artist and Botanist-A Collaboration.” Her work has also been exhibited with the National League of American Pen Women, the Guild of Natural science illustrators, and the hunt institute for Botanical Documentation at Carnegie-Mellon University." The Agricultural Research Service Handbook 366, which contains 224 full-page plates of her work and has been published under the title "Common Weeds of the US," by Dover Press." The USDA Handbook N0. 498,"Economically Important Foreign Weeds, Potential Problems in the United States," contains over 6,000 of her drawings of seeds and plants. Her orchid paintings are permanently on public view at the National Museum of Natural History at the Smithsonian Museum.

A partial list includes:

- Famous International Exhibition of Fine and Applied Arts by Deaf Artist 1934 [Roerich Museum, New York City]
- Journal of the Bromeliad Society; Grassland Seeds (1957)
- Stetches of the United States- Native, Naturalized, and cultivated (1960)
- Identification of crop and weed seeds (1963)
- National Arboretum 1968
- Selected weeds of the United States(1970)
- Commons Weeds of the United States (1971)
- The agave family in Sonora (1972)
- Aquatic and wetland plants of the southwestern United States (1972)
- National Agricultural Library 1972
- Economically important foreign weeds (1977)
- Selby Botanical Garden 1986 [Sarasota, Florida]
- Eastern Orchid Congress 1986 [Alexandria, Virginia]
- Gallaudet University 1986 [Washington DC]
- The Genera of the Eupatorieae (Asteraceae) (1987)
- Caryopsis morphology and classification in the triticeae (pooideae: poaceae) [1993]
- National Orchid Collection
- Washington Water Color Association
- Brookside Gardens [Maryland]

== Honors ==
- Superior Service Award from the Department of Agriculture, 1962
- Honorary Degree of Doctor of Human Letters From Gallaudet College, 1967
- Woman of the Year by Gallaudet Sorority Phi Kappa Zeta (1979)
- “Artist of the Year” by the Chevy Chase Branch of the National League of American Pen Women (1980)
- New plant genus and species of Asteraceae named after her "Hughesia reginae," 1981
- Amos Kendall Award (1981)
- The guild of Natural Science Illustrators member
