= Esther M. Conwell =

American physicist

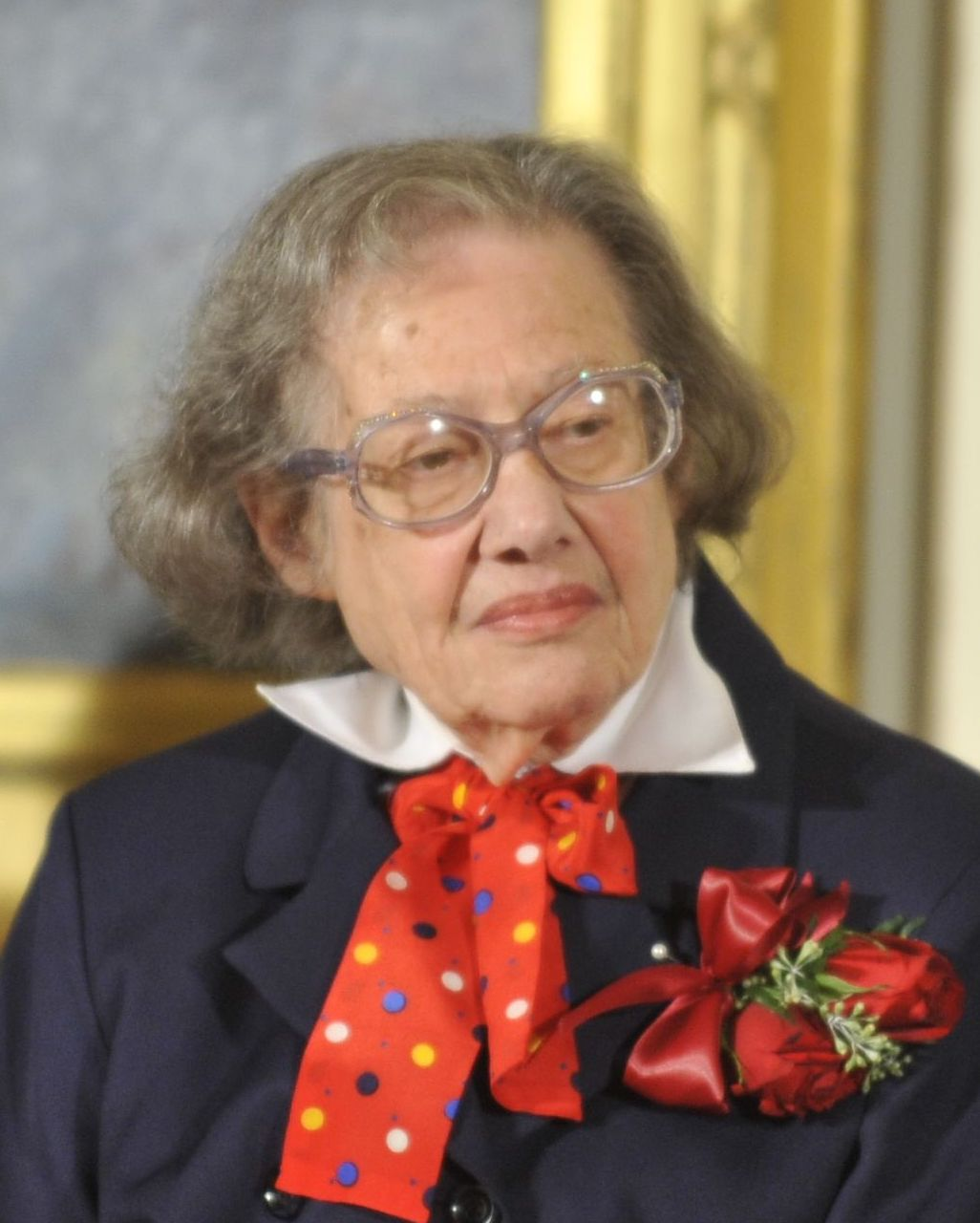
- Conwell in 2010
- Born: Esther Marley Conwell, May 23, 1922; New York
- Died: November 16, 2014 (aged 92); Rochester, New York
- Education: Brooklyn College (B.A. Physics, 1942); University of Rochester (M.S. Physics, 1945); University of Chicago (Ph.D. Physics, 1948)
- Known for: Conwell-Weisskopf theory that describes the flow of electrons in semiconductors due to impurity-related scattering, which led to an understanding of how transistors work and was instrumental in the birth of the electronics industry
- Scientific career
- Fields: Physics, Engineering
- Workplaces: University of Rochester
- Engineering career
- Discipline: Electronics, Semiconductor physics
- Employers: Sylvania/GTE; Western Electric, Bell Laboratories, Xerox
- Significant design: High Field Transport in Semiconductors (textbook); Optical modulators, imaging systems, externally controllable miniature lasers (patents)
- Significant advance: Theoretical condensed-matter physics; fundamental contributions to transport theory in semiconductor and organic conductors, and their application to the semiconducting materials which jumpstarted the Computer Age
- Awards: Society of Women Engineers Achievement Award (1960); IEEE Edison Medal (1997); National Medal of Science (2009)

Esther Marley Conwell (May 23, 1922 – November 16, 2014) was a pioneering American chemist and physicist, best known for the Conwell-Weisskopf theory that describes how electrons travel through semiconductors, a breakthrough that helped revolutionize modern computing. Her work enabled the microelectronics industry, long-distance communications networks, advanced photocopying, solar cells, and light-emitting diodes.

Conwell studied properties of semiconductors and organic conductors, especially electron transport. In 1990, she became an adjunct professor at the University of Rochester while still working at Xerox. In 1998, she joined the University of Rochester faculty full-time as a professor of chemistry, focused on the flow of electrons through DNA.

Conwell held four patents and published more than 270 papers and multiple textbooks over the course of her career. Her textbook, High Field Transport in Semiconductors, became the authoritative text in the field. She received numerous honors, including the National Medal of Science in 2009.

== Early life and education ==
Esther Marley Conwell grew up in New York City, the oldest of three daughters of immigrant parents. Education was important in her family. Conwell took biology and physics, but not chemistry, in high school. Her attraction to the innate order of physics, and her distaste for lab work, eventually led her to theoretical physics.

Conwell obtained a physics B.A. from Brooklyn College in 1942, Phi Beta Kappa. A professor there, Professor Kurrelmeyer, suggested that she apply to graduate school. She attended the University of Rochester and completed a M.S. in physics in 1945 with Victor Weisskopf. Conwell collaborated with Karl Lark-Horovitz and Vivian Johnson at Purdue University on electron scattering by impurities in germanium. Her masters was initially classified then finally declassified in 1945 and subsequently her M.S. was awarded in which she determined the Conwell-Weisskopf theory. This theory is one of the fundamental properties for semiconductor physics and a prerequisite for modern electronics.

== Career ==
After her first year of graduate school, Conwell was employed by Western Electric as an assistant engineer*.

Conwell received her physics Ph.D. from the University of Chicago under the advisement of Nobel Laureate Subrahmanyan Chandrasekhar at Yerkes Observatory. She was a teaching assistant at Chicago and graded the work of Nobel Laureates such as Chen-Ning Yang and Owen Chamberlain. She was an instructor in physics at Brooklyn College (1946–1951). She returned to Chicago for her orals and earned her Ph.D. in 1948.

She took a leave of absence from Brooklyn College and worked for a year as a researcher at Bell Laboratories (1951–1952) where she worked with William Shockley. While there, she became familiar with hot electrons, a field in which she would work for many years. She wrote a review paper on the properties of transistors which became many people’s introduction to semiconductors. The paper also led to her being an expert on the complexity of electronics and holes in semiconductors.

She then became a staff member at Sylvania where she would work for 20 years. Her research focused on semiconductors – theoretical analysis of germanium and silicon. Conwell served as a Visiting Professor for the 1962-1963 academic year in Paris, France at the École Normale Supérieure. Her 1967 book, High Field Transport in Semiconductors, became a basic text in the field. After GTE bought Sylvania, her research focus changed to support of telecommunications and then moved into integrated optics. When GTE closed her lab, she spent a semester as the Abby Rockefeller Mauzé Professor at MIT, courtesy of her former intern, Millie Dresselhaus.

In 1972 she joined the Xerox Wilson Research Center, where her focus changed to glassy one-dimensional materials. She worked with conducting polymers that radiated light when they were properly stimulated. Xerography requires a significant amount of physics – to get an image on the surface of a photoconductor and then transport it somewhere else and Conwell was involved with the transport mechanism. Her research impacted the printers and cell phones that we currently use. Conwell was a research fellow at Xerox from 1981 to 1998.

In 1989, Conwell helped bring the NSF Center for Photoinduced Charge Transfer to the University of Rochester which was a collaborative effort between Xerox, Eastman Kodak, and the University of Rochester. She became the Associate Director starting in 1991.

After Conwell retired from Xerox, she maintained her affiliation with the University of Rochester, where she held a dual appointment in the chemistry and physics departments. She continued to serve as Associate Director of the Center. Conwell worked at the University of Rochester until her death at the age of 92. Her later research projects led to more knowledge of how electrical charges move through DNA.

== Awards, honors and affiliations ==
Conwell performed extensive professional service and served on numerous government advisory boards. She was active in the American Physical Society, the American Institute of Physics, and the Institute of Electrical and Electronics Engineers. She served on the Defense Science Board, committees of the National Research Council, and the National Materials Advisory Board on Critical Materials.

Conwell was made a fellow of the IEEE in 1980 “for contributions to semiconductor theory, particularly transport in both low and high electric fields.” She was also a fellow of the American Physical Society.

In 1960 she had received the Achievement Award of the Society of Women Engineers in "recognition of her significant contributions as a research physicist in the field of solid state research".

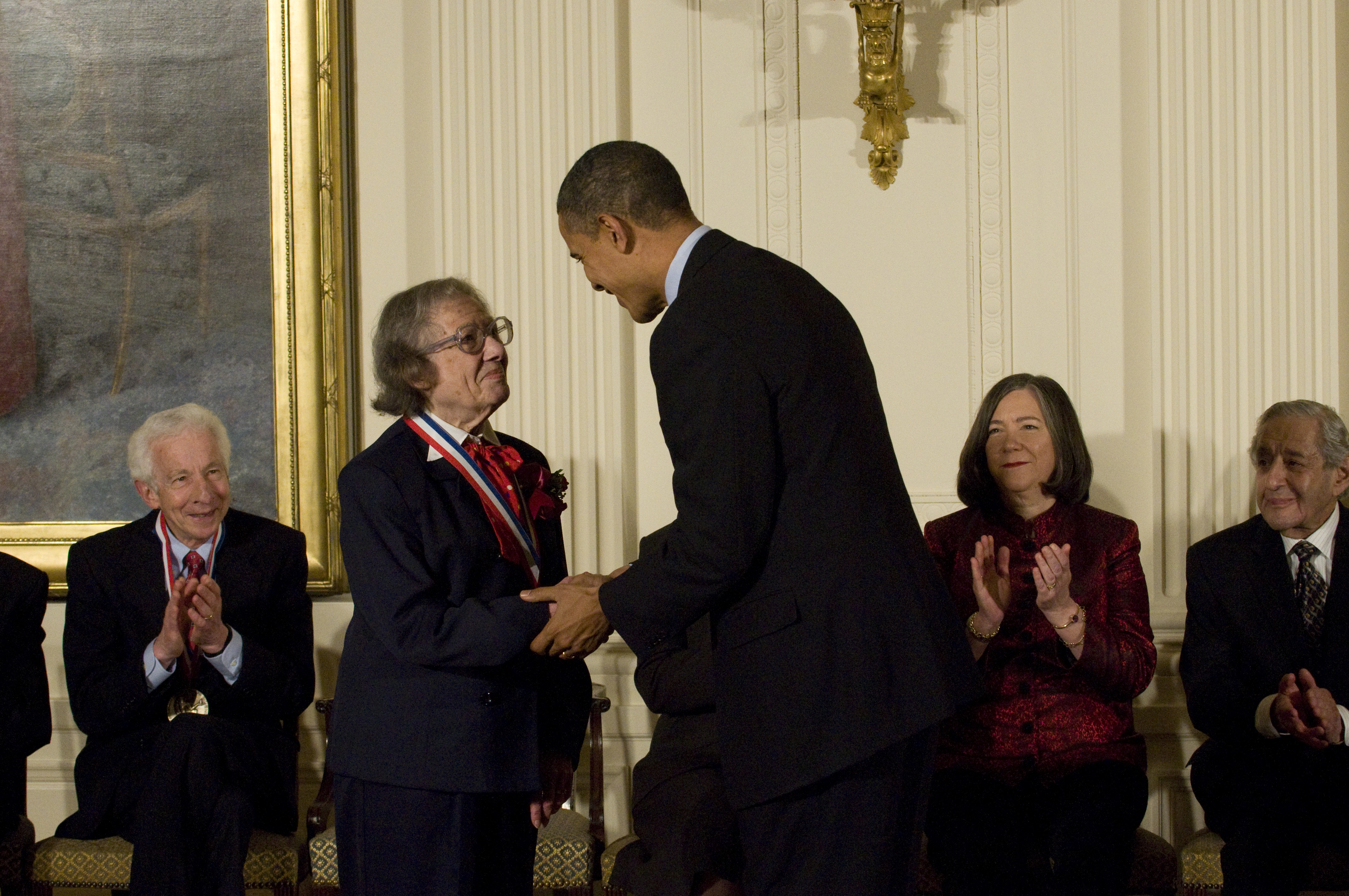
Conwell receiving the National Medal of Science from President Barack Obama

She was elected to the National Academy of Engineering (1980), the National Academy of Sciences (1990) and the American Academy of Arts and Sciences (1992). She is the only member of the University of Rochester to achieve this.

In 1997 she received the IEEE Thomas Alva Edison Medal for "fundamental contributions to transport theory in semiconductor and organic conductors, and their application to the semiconductor, electronic copying and printing industries." Other notable awardees include Alexander Graham Bell, Vannevar Bush, and Michael Pupin.

In 2009, Conwell received the prestigious National Medal of Science from President Barack Obama, for "her broad contributions to understanding electron and hole transport in semiconducting materials, which helped to enable commercial applications of semiconductor and organic electronic devices, and for extending her analysis to studying the electronic properties of DNA." She was nominated by Mildred Dresselhaus, a professor of physics and electrical engineering at MIT and a National Medal of Science winner.

Conwell received honorary doctorates from the University of Rochester and Brooklyn College.

Discover magazine (November 2002) listed Conwell as one of the 50 most important women scientists at the time. Her legacy includes receiving the 2004 Dreyfus Senior Faculty Mentor Award for serving as a research mentor to undergraduates, the 2006 University of Rochester Susan B. Anthony Lifetime Achievement Award for her efforts in advocating and promoting women in science., and the 2008 ACS Award for Encouraging Women into Careers in the Chemical Sciences.

== Legacy ==
Conwell has received numerous awards and honors for her contributions to the field of semiconductor science. She was a pioneer in the field of theoretical physics and frequently the only woman in her classes and engineering workplaces. In 1948, the year Conwell received her Physics Ph.D., only five other women in the United States had received a similar degree (less than 2% of the total Ph.Ds.).

Conwell persisted through many obstacles women faced who worked in nontraditional careers of the era. After obtaining her B.A. in 1942, she worked a summer job at Western Electric as an assistant engineer. But because payroll did not have a job title code for her gender, her title was changed to engineers assistant and her pay reduced to fit an existing code. Even with her doctorate degree in hand, she was only able to secure non-tenured positions in academia due to the discriminatory hiring practices of the day. Thus she pursued industry in her early career.

Conwell persisted and was recognized with the highest engineering honors. She was the second woman to be elected to both the National Academy of Engineering (1980) and the National Academy of Sciences (1990). She was the first woman to win the IEEE Edison Medal (1997), the Institute's oldest medal awarded for a career of meritorious achievement in electrical science, electrical engineering, or the electrical arts.

Conwell mentored young women throughout her career. Conwell once said, "My life is the story of women scientists making a place in the world". She received the Dreyfus Foundation’s Senior Scientist Mentor Program Award (2005), The Susan B. Anthony Award from the University of Rochester (2006), and the American Chemical Society Award for Encouraging Women into Careers in the Chemical Sciences (2008).

The Esther M. Conwell Graduate Fellowship was established by her son, Lewis Rothberg and his wife, Shelby Nelson. It provides stipends for merit-based fellowships for advanced graduate students pursuing a PhD in Chemistry at the University of Rochester who show exceptional promise as researchers.

== Personal life ==
Conwell married Abraham Rothberg, a novelist, in 1944. Their son, Lewis Rothberg, is also a tenured professor of physics, physical chemistry, and chemical engineering at the University of Rochester; his research focuses on organic electronics and biomolecular sensing using laser energetics.

On November 16, 2014, Conwell was walking when she was struck by her neighbor's car as he was backing out of his driveway. Capt. David Catholdi of the Brighton Police Department stated that alcohol and speed were not factors in the incident. She was taken to Strong Memorial Hospital, where she died from her injuries several hours later. She was 92 years old and was still actively pursuing research.

== Additional reading ==
- Tietjen, Jill S. (2025). Chapter 12 "Esther M. Conwell". In Craig, Cecilia; Teig, Holly; Kimberling, Debra; Williams, Janet; Tietjen, Jill; Johnson, Vicki (eds.). Women Engineering Legends 1952-1976: Society of Women Engineers Achievement Award Recipients. Springer Cham. ISBN 978-3-032-00223-5
- Tietjen, Jill S.; Ozturk, Mehmet C. (2026). "Chapter 2: Esther M. Conwell (1922-2014)". Pioneering Women of Solid-State Physics: Breaking Boundaries. Springer Cham. ISBN 978-3-032-18112-1.
