= C7H11NO3 =

The molecular formula C_{7}H_{11}NO_{3} (molar mass: 157.167 g/mol, exact mass: 157.0739 u) may refer to:

- Ethadione
- Furanomycin
- Paramethadione
