= ACS Award for Encouraging Women into Careers in the Chemical Sciences =

Award for chemists and chemical engineers

The award, sponsored by The Camille and Henry Dreyfus Foundation, was instituted in 1993 with the intention of recognizing "significant accomplishments by individuals who have stimulated or fostered the interest of women in chemistry, promoting their professional development as chemists or chemical engineers." Recipients receive $5,000, a certificate, up to $1,500 for travel expenses, and a grant of $10,000. The deadline for nomination is 1 November every year.

== Recipients ==
Awardees are listed here along with their affiliation at the time of the award.

2026	Jean Tom	Princeton University (Bristol Myers Squibb, retired)
2025	Rachel Mamlok-Naaman	Weizmann Institute of science
2024	Elsa Reichmanis	Lehigh University
2023	Caroline Ylitalo	3M
2022	Mindy Levine	Ariel University
2021	Kay Brummond	University of Pittsburgh
2020	Katherine J. Franz	Duke University
2019	Ruth E. Baltus	Clarkson University
2018	Rebecca T. Ruck	Merck & Co
2017	Judith M. Iriarte-Gross	Middle Tennessee State University
2016	Carol A. Fierke	University of Michigan
2015	E. Ann Nalley	Cameron University
2014	Sandra C. Greer	Mills College
2013	Heather C. Allen	Ohio State University
2012	Yves J. Chabal	University of Texas at Dallas
2011	Mamie W. Moy	University of Houston
2010	Mildred S. Dresselhaus	Massachusetts Institute of Technology
2009	Mary F. Singleton	
2008	Esther M. Conwell	National Science Foundation
2007	Bojan H. Jennings	
2006	Catherine H. Middlecamp	University of Wisconsin-Madison
2005	Geraldine L. Richmond	University of Oregon
2004	Margaret-Ann Armour	University of Alberta
2003	Madeleine Jacobs	American Chemical Society
2002	Barbara A. Sawrey	University of California San Diego
2001	Christina Bodurow Erwin	Eli Lilly & Co.
2000	Valerie J. Kuck	Bell Laboratories
1999	Jeanette Grasselli-Brown	New Jersey Institute of Technology
1998	Madeleine M. Joullié	University of Pennsylvania
1997	Mary E. Thompson	
1996	Nina Roscher	
1995	Margaret C. Cavanaugh	National Science Foundation

== See also ==
- List of chemistry awards
- List of science and technology awards for women
