= Nina Roscher =

American chemist

- Born: Uniontown, Pennsylvania
- Died: September 19, 2001 (aged 62)
- Education: University of Delaware, BS in chemistry, 1960; Purdue University, PhD in physical organic chemistry, 1964
- Awards: ACS Award for Encouraging Women into Careers in the Chemical Sciences(1996); Presidential Award for Excellence in Science, Mathematics and Engineering Mentoring (1998)
- Scientific career
- Fields: physical organic chemistry
- Workplaces: American University; University of Texas, Austin; Rutgers University

Nina Matheny Roscher (1938—2001) was an American chemist and advocate for women and minorities in science. She also researched the history of women in chemistry, publishing the book Women Chemists (1995). She served as professor and chair of the chemistry department at American University in Washington, D.C. She received the ACS Award for Encouraging Women into Careers in the Chemical Sciences (1996) and the Presidential Award for Excellence in Science, Mathematics and Engineering Mentoring (1998).

== Early life and education ==
Roscher was born in 1938 in Uniontown, Pennsylvania, and raised in Hershey, Pennsylvania. She received a B.S. in chemistry from the University of Delaware in 1960. She graduated from Purdue University with a doctorate in physical organic chemistry in 1964. While at Purdue, she founded the Iota Sigma Pi chapter of the Honor Society for Women in Chemistry.

== Career ==
After graduating from Purdue in 1964, she taught at the University of Texas at Austin and Rutgers University, then joined the faculty of American University (AU) in Washington, D.C., in 1974. At AU, she served in numerous administrative roles including associate dean for graduate affairs and research, vice provost for academic services, and dean for faculty affairs. She was active in the university senate, chaired a budget simplification task force, and served as the school's NCAA faculty representative. In 1991, she was appointed chair of AU's chemistry department, a position she held until her death in 2001.

=== Chemistry research ===
At American University, she continued physical organic chemistry research, including research on sunscreens for Johnson and Johnson in the 1980s. Her primary focus was reactions of alcohols with silver and bromine salts, and she supervised numerous graduate students, more than half of whom were women.

=== Advocacy work ===
She is better known for her administrative and advocacy work. She worked closely with her AU colleague, mathematician Mary Gray to improve resources for women and minorities in mathematics and science and prevent them from dropping classes. They created an apprenticeship program to help show first year female students an interdisciplinary, people-oriented perspective of scientists. The program, funded by a $95,000 grant from the NSF included a seminar course followed by a two-month apprenticeship working with a scientist engaged in science policy work.

From 1976 to 1981, she administered a National Science Foundation (NSF)-funded reentry program to retrain women with degrees in chemistry or biology who had previously been discouraged from pursuing careers in those fields. The program involved a year of intensive coursework in chemistry or toxicology at American University for 75 women, with an average age of 40, some of whom had been out of school for 15 years. Five years after the program ended, of the 75 participants, nine had received a Ph.D. in chemistry, 25 had earned master's degrees, and eight were in graduate school. Later analysis showed the program had also succeeded in ensuring them job placement in diverse career paths.

In addition to her work at AU, she held a part-time position as program director of science education for the National Science Foundation (NSF) starting in 1986. At the NSF, she worked in the Instructional Laboratory Improvement Program, then became director of the Undergraduate Faculty Enhancement program in the Division of Undergraduate Science, Engineering, and Mathematics Education (USEME) in 1988.

She joined the American Chemical Society (ACS) in 1960 and was very active in the organization. She served on the ACS Women Chemists Committee from 1974 to 1979 (as chair 1976-1978) and was president of ACS' Washington, D.C., section (the Chemical Society of Washington) in 1995.

=== Historian work ===
She was interested in the history of women in chemistry, and authored the book Women Chemists for the American Chemical Society in 1995. Much of her extensive research on female chemists is archived in the Archives of Women in Science and Engineering at Iowa State University; these "Nina Matheny Roscher Papers" are open for research and commonly cited.

She also looked to the present and future of women in chemistry, analyzing statistics on disparities in training, retention, and compensation of female scientists. She compiled a 1990 ACS survey evaluating salaries of members and women's perceptions and satisfaction with their employment situation and opportunities for advancement.

== Personal life ==
Roscher's outside interests included landscaping and remodeling of a cabin she owned in Lost River, West Virginia. She died from breast cancer September 19, 2001, at Georgetown University Hospital at the age of 62.

== Honors and awards ==
In 1996 she received the ACS Award for Encouraging Women into Careers in the Chemical Sciences.

In 1998, she received the Presidential Award for Excellence in Science, Mathematics and Engineering Mentoring, a yearly award administered by the National Science Foundation (NSF) which recognizes up to ten "outstanding individual efforts and organizational programs designed to increase the participation of underrepresented groups in mathematics, engineering, and science in kindergarten-12th grade and through the graduate level". She was one of six chemists to receive the $10,000 grant award that year, which was presented by President Bill Clinton at a White House ceremony.

- Honorary Membership Award, Chemistry, Graduate Women in Science (GWIS),1982
- ACS Award for Encouraging Women into Careers in the Chemical Sciences, 1986
- American Association for the Advancement of Sciences, fellow, 1987
- Presidential Award for Excellence in Science, Mathematics and Engineering Mentoring, 1988
- Distinguished Alumna, Purdue University, 1996
- Senior Scholar Special Commendation of Honor, American Association of University Women, 1998
- American Institute of Chemists, fellow

== Selected publications ==
- Roscher, Nina Matheny; Waters, Paul F.; Cantrell, Thomas S.; Hanson, Louise Karle; Carson, Frederick W. (October 1978). "Curriculum for continuing education in chemistry". Journal of Chemical Education. 55 (10): 646. Bibcode:1978JChEd..55..646R. doi:10.1021/ed055p646. ISSN 0021-9584.
- Roscher, Nina Matheny (January 1980). "Retraining chemists - Is it worthwhile?". Journal of Chemical Education. 57 (1): 60. Bibcode:1980JChEd..57...60R. doi:10.1021/ed057p60. ISSN 0021-9584.
- Roscher, Nina Matheny (September 1987). "Chemistry's creative women". Journal of Chemical Education. 64 (9): 748. Bibcode:1987JChEd..64..748R. doi:10.1021/ed064p748. ISSN 0021-9584.
- Roscher, Nina Matheny; Cavanaugh, Margaret A. (October 1987). "Academic women chemists in the 20th century: Past, present, projections". Journal of Chemical Education. 64 (10): 823. Bibcode:1987JChEd..64..823R. doi:10.1021/ed064p823. ISSN 0021-9584.
- Roscher, Nina Matheny; Lindemann, Martin K.O.; Bin Kong, Suk; Cho, Cheon G.; Jiang, Ping (1994-05-31). "Photodecomposition of several compounds commonly used as sunscreen agents". Journal of Photochemistry and Photobiology A: Chemistry. 80 (1–3): 417–421. doi:10.1016/1010-6030(94)01043-9. ISSN 1010-6030.
