= Stanley M. Truhlsen =

American ophthalmologist (1920–2021)

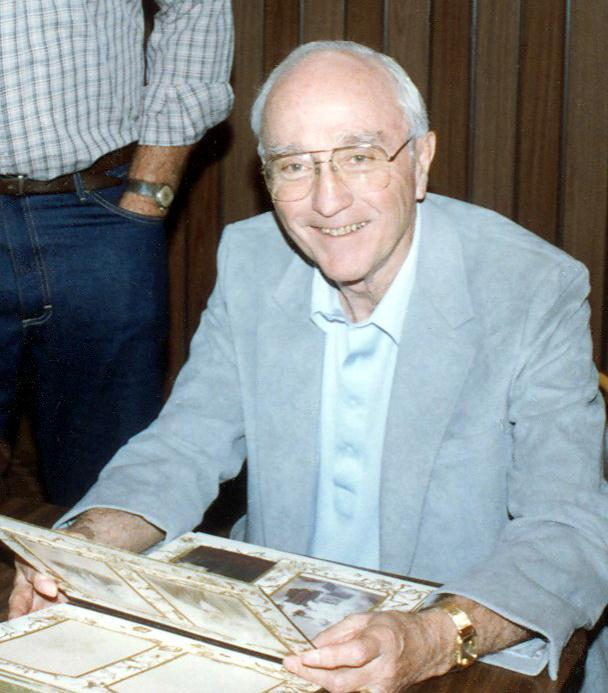
- Truhlsen in 1988
- Born: Stanley Marshall Truhlsen; November 13, 1920; Herman, Nebraska, U.S.
- Died: December 23, 2021 (aged 101); Omaha, Nebraska, U.S.
- Education: University of Nebraska
- Occupation(s): Ophthalmologist, professor

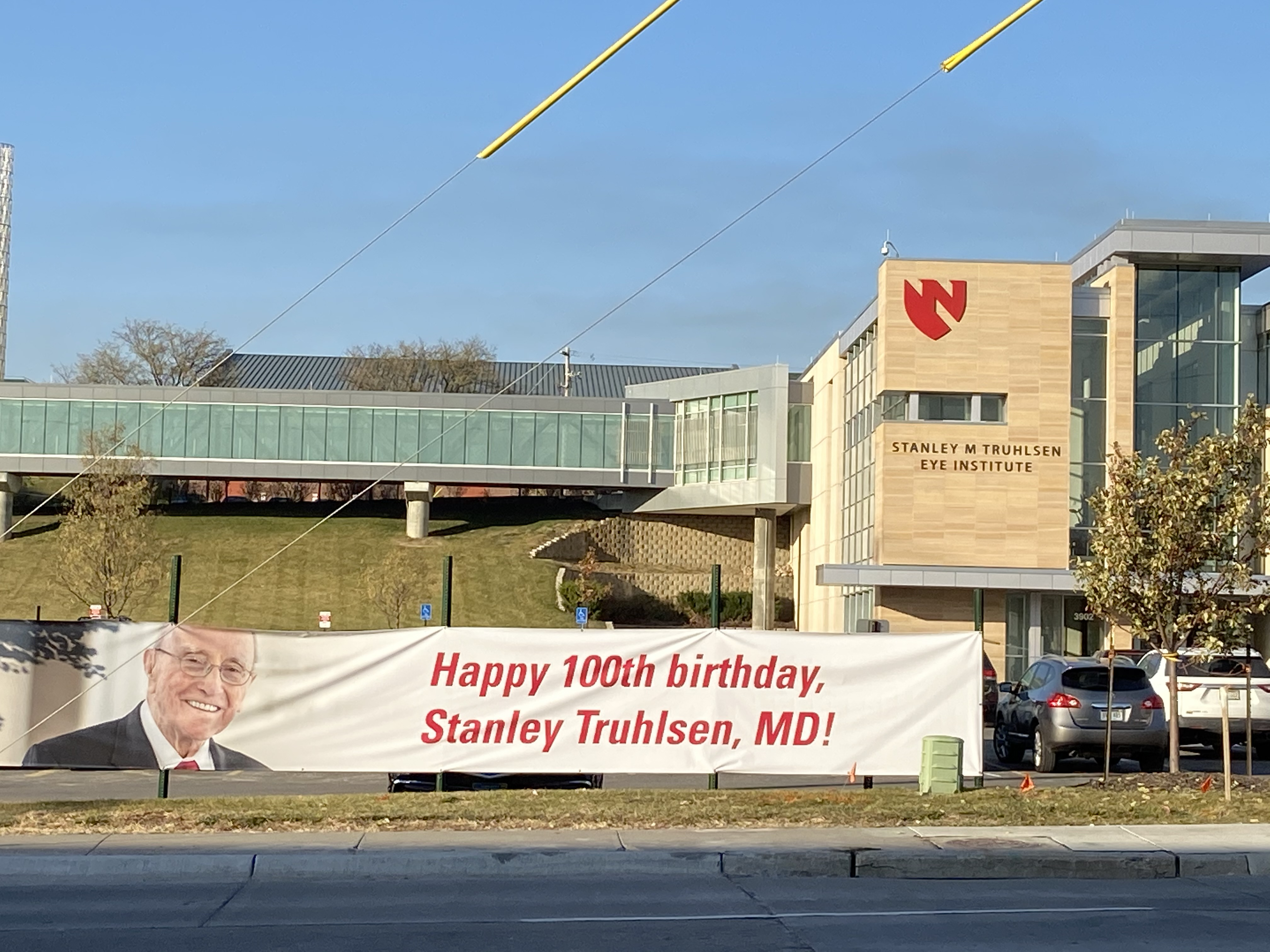
Centenary banner in 2020 at the eye institute in Omaha named for Truhlsen

Stanley Marshall Truhlsen Sr. (November 13, 1920 – December 23, 2021) was an American ophthalmologist and university professor in Omaha who served as president of the American Academy of Ophthalmology and as a governor of the American College of Surgeons, and led a number of Nebraska organizations.

== Life and career ==
He was a native of Herman, Nebraska, where his parents were Henry "Spike" Truhlsen (1891–1970) and Lola Marshall Truhlsen (1897–1979). His paternal grandfather Niels Truedsson (1847–1921) left Scania in Sweden in the 1870s and came to the United States via Germany, settling in Blair, Nebraska with his surname anglicized as Truhlsen.

Stanley Truhlsen attended Herman High School where he was on the basketball team. He completed undergraduate work in 1941 and received his Doctor of Medicine degree at the University of Nebraska in 1944. He then completed his internship and residency at Albany Hospital in New York before entering the army in 1946. He served in the United States Army Medical Corps, where he served at army hospitals at Camp Polk, Louisiana and Scott Field, Illinois. He was a first lieutenant.

He joined the faculty at the University of Nebraska Medical Center, was made a full professor there in 1974, got the university's Alumni Achievement Award in 1986 and remained its emeritus. In 1965, Truhlsen was elected to the then 100-year-old American Ophthalmological Society.

Truhlsen served on the board of directors and executive committee of Nebraska Blue Cross-Blue Shield 1970-1993 and, also in 1970, was on the board of the Health Planning Council of the Midlands. He was also on the boards of Omaha Home for Boys, the Nebraska Society to Prevent Blindness and the Omaha Citizens Assembly.

In 1959, he formed a partnership with investor Warren Buffett with 10 other doctors. He kept the Berkshire stocks when Warren Buffett liquidated the partnership in 1969 In 1983, Truhlsen became president of the American Academy of Ophthalmology with which he had been associated since 1951, when he had returned to Omaha from a residency at Barnes Hospital and Washington University School of Medicine. He became an associate editor and later editor of the academy's journal Transactions.

Other organizations which Truhlsen served as president include the American Eye Study Club, the Nebraska Academy of Ophthalmology, Omaha Medical Society, the medical staffs of Omaha's Clarkson (1972) and Immanuel Hospitals, the Exchange Club of Omaha and Rotary of Omaha. He was on the board of councillors for the Nebraska Medical Association (1981) and president of the University of Nebraska chapter of Alpha Omega Alpha national medical honorary society. Clarkson Hospital honored him in 1985 with its Outstanding Physician Award. The Nebraska Affiliate of the National Society to Prevent Blindness gave him its People of Vision Award in 1986.

While he was a governor of the American College of Surgeons in 1985, Truhlsen's home state elected him to the honorary position of King of Quivira as Ak-Sar-Ben XCI. His first connection with Ak-Sar-Ben was in his childhood when his father had served as an ambassador of the organization and brought Truhlsen and his young friends to Omaha for its events for boys.

The University of Nebraska College of Medical Alumni gave Stanley M. Truhlsen Sr. its first Distinguished Alumnus Achievement Award in 1989. That year he also had the Omaha Health Citizen of the Year Award from the Combined Health Agencies Drive. In 2001 he received the Lucien Howe Medal from the American Ophthalmological Society (AOS), the only award given by the AOS. From 1998 to 2010 he was also on the board of Durham Museum.

The University of Nebraska Medical Center, where Truhlsen was on the faculty as early as 1951, gave him its Distinguished Service Award in 2003 and in 2009 announced that it would build a multimillion-dollar eye institute, and the Stanley M. Truhlsen Eye Institute opened in 2013. Truhlsen provided a key donation for the project.

Truhlsen had two sons and two daughters by his first wife, Ruth (née Haney), who died in 1976. In 1981, he married Dorothy D. Johnson of Denison, Iowa. She died in November 2021, at the age of 92. His son, Stanley M. Truhlsen Jr., died in 2018, at the age of 67. He died on December 23, 2021, at the age of 101.
