= Kay Brummond =

American synthetic chemist

Kay Michille Brummond
- Education: University of Nebraska–Lincoln; Pennsylvania State University
- Scientific career
- Workplaces: University of Rochester; West Virginia University; University of Pittsburgh
- Thesis: Synthetic approach to the calicheamicin/esperamicin bicyclo(7.3.1)tridecenediyne ring core and sulfones in organic synthesis. (1991)
- Website: Brummond Lab

Kay Michille Brummond is an American synthetic chemist who is Professor of Chemistry and Associate Dean of Faculty at the University of Pittsburgh. Her interests consider cycloaddition reactions that can realise molecules and natural products for organic photovoltaics and targeted covalent inhibitors. She was elected a Fellow of the American Chemical Society (ACS) in 2010, a Fellow of the AAAS in 2021, and awarded the ACS National Award for Encouraging Women into Careers in the Chemical Sciences in 2021.

== Early life and education ==
Brummond grew up in the town of Herman in eastern Nebraska. She grew up on a corn and soybeans farm, and was the first member of her family to attend college. She attended the Tekamah-Herman High School and earned her undergraduate degree in secondary education (B.S.) at the University of Nebraska–Lincoln. She moved to Pennsylvania State University for her doctoral research, where she focused on organic synthesis with Raymond L. Funk. In 1991, she joined the University of Rochester, where she spent two years as a postdoctoral researcher with Robert K. Boeckman, Jr.

== Research and career ==
In 1993, Brummond joined the faculty at West Virginia University, where she was promoted to associate professor. She moved to the University of Pittsburgh in 2001, where she was promoted to professor in 2006 and elected department chair in 2014. Brummond served as the Associate Dean of Faculty for the Dietrich School of Arts and Sciences at the University of Pittsburgh (2017–2023).

Brummond studies the Pauson–Khand reaction, targeted covalent inhibitors, transition-metal catalyzed cyclocarbonylation, and dearomative cycloaddition reactions. She works on the design, synthesis, and characterization of guaianolide analog covalent inhibitors with muted reactivity to thiols. In particular, she is interested in identifying the structure–activity relationships of these analogs. To assemble the 5,7,5-ring system, Brummond uses an allenic Pauson–Khand reactions and other cyclization process. To regulate the thiol reactivity and increase affinity for the kinase and protease targets, Brummond modifies the covalent reactive groups.

She has designed novel transition metal catalysts, including Rh(I). She has shown that stereoconvergent allenic Pauson–Khand reactions catalysed by Rh(I) can result in highly enantioselective 5,7-ring systems, which enable the enantioselective synthesis of compounds such as thapsigargin. Her approach includes collaborations with computational chemists for the rational design of transition metal catalysts and ligands through analysis of transition-state structures and energies to achieve stereoselective reaction products.

=== Academic service ===
Brummond has advocated for women and underrepresented groups in science. She has worked with both her home institutions and the American Chemical Society to improve gender balance, and recognized for this work as the Diversity Catalyst Lecturer by the Open Chemistry Collaborative in Diversity Equity (OXIDE) partnership mechanism in 2014. She established the University of Pittsburgh Summer Undergraduate Research Fellowship (SURF) program, which offers research placements to undergraduate students. She launched various outreach programs to introduce young girls to scientific careers. Brummond has created a list of actions that people can take to become an ally to women working in chemistry, namely;

1. Inviting a woman chemist to give a seminar;
2. Engaging with women’s research;
3. Developing an inclusivity and/or diversity statement together with your research group;
4. Nominating a woman for an award;
5. Educating yourself on gender disparities, and barriers, and know the data;
6. Celebrating the chemistry achievements of women;
7. Working to prepare the next generation of women chemists;
8. Mitigating unconscious biases through your actions; and
9. Working to fix the institution not the individual.

=== Symposiums and Conferences Organized ===
Brummond has been active in organizing or co-organizing several national chemistry conferences including:

- Vice Chair - 2003 Organic Reactions and Processes Gordon Research Conference
- Chair - 2004 Organic Reactions and Processes Gordon Research Conference
- Co-organizer - "Accelerated Reaction Discovery" at the Telluride Science Research Center - 2011 to 2021
- Co-organizer - The 44th National Organic Chemistry Symposium, University of Maryland, College Park, MD - 2015
- Executive Officer - The 45th National Organic Chemistry Symposium, UC-Davis CA - 2017

== Awards and honors ==
- 2006 American Chemical Society Akron Section Award
- 2007 Carnegie Science Center Emerging Female Scientist Award
- 2010 Elected Fellow of the American Chemical Society
- 2015 American Chemical Society Pittsburgh Award
- 2016 Diversity Catalyst Lecturer, Open Chemistry Collaborative in Diversity Equity (OXIDE) partnership, Johns Hopkins University
- 2016 Harold Kohn Endowed Alumni Lectureship, department of chemistry, Pennsylvania State University
- 2018 University of Pittsburgh Provost's Spotlight on Women Leaders Series
- 2018 Chancellor's Distinguished Public Service Award
- 2020 American Chemical Society Remarkable Woman in Organic Chemistry
- 2021 American Chemical Society Award for Encouraging Women into Careers in the Chemical Sciences
- 2021 Elected Fellow of the American Association for the Advancement of Science
- 2022 Elected to the Board of Directors of Organic Syntheses

== Selected publications ==
- Eric D. Deihl; Luke T. Jesikiewicz; Logan J. Newman; Peng Liu; Kay M. Brummond Deihl, Eric D.; Jesikiewicz, Luke T.; Newman, Logan J.; Liu, Peng; Brummond, Kay M. (26 January 2022). "Rh(I)-Catalyzed Allenic Pauson–Khand Reaction to Access the Thapsigargin Core: Influence of Furan and Allenyl Chloroacetate Groups on Enantioselectivity". Org. Lett. 2022, 24 (4) (4): 995–999. doi:10.1021/acs.orglett.1c03951. PMID 35081313. S2CID 246295907.
- Lauren C. Burrows; Luke T. Jesikiewicz; Peng Liu; Kay M. Brummond Burrows, Lauren C.; Jesikiewicz, Luke T.; Liu, Peng; Brummond, Kay M. (18 December 2020). "Mechanism and Origins of Enantioselectivity in the Rh(I)-Catalyzed Pauson–Khand Reaction: Comparison of Bidentate and Monodentate Chiral Ligands". ACS Catalysis. 2021, 11 (1): 323–336. doi:10.1021/acscatal.0c03774. S2CID 234237620.
- Paul A. Jackson; Henry A. M. Schares; Katherine F. Jones; John C. Widen; Daniel Dempe; Matthew Cuellar; Michael Walters; Daniel A. Harki; Kay M. Brummond Jackson, Paul A.; Schares, Henry A. M.; Jones, Katherine F. M.; Widen, John C.; Dempe, Daniel P.; Grillet, Francois; Cuellar, Matthew E.; Walters, Michael A.; Harki, Daniel A.; Brummond, Kay M. (17 November 2020). "Synthesis of Guaianolide Analogues with a Tunable α-Methylene−γ-lactam Electrophile and Correlating Bioactivity with Thiol Reactivity". J. Med. Chem. 2020, 63 (23) (23): 14951–14978. doi:10.1021/acs.jmedchem.0c01464. PMC 8877724. PMID 33201697.
- Lauren C. Parrette; Luke T. Jesikiewicz; Gang Lu; Steve J. Geib; Peng Liu; Kay M. Brummond Burrows, Lauren C.; Jesikiewicz, Luke T.; Lu, Gang; Geib, Steven J.; Liu, Peng; Brummond, Kay M. (12 October 2017). "Computationally Guided Catalyst Design in the Type I Dynamic Kinetic Asymmetric Pauson–Khand Reaction of Allenyl Acetates". J. Am. Chem. Soc. 2017, 139 (42) (42): 15022–15032. Bibcode:2017JAChS.13915022B. doi:10.1021/jacs.7b07121. PMID 29022341.
- Paul A Jackson; John C Widen; Daniel A Harki; Brummond, Kay (2016). "Covalent Modifiers: A Chemical Perspective on the Reactivity of α,β-Unsaturated Carbonyls with Thiols via Hetero-Michael Addition Reactions". Journal of Medicinal Chemistry. 60 (3): 839–885. doi:10.1021/acs.jmedchem.6b00788. PMC 5308545. PMID 27996267. Wikidata Q29248430.
- Kay M. Brummond; Laura S. Kocsis Brummond, Kay M.; Kocsis, Laura S. (24 July 2015). "Intramolecular Didehydro-Diels–Alder Reaction and Its Impact on the Structure–Function Properties of Environmentally Sensitive Fluorophores". Acc. Chem. Res. 2015, 48 (8) (8): 2320–2329. doi:10.1021/acs.accounts.5b00126. PMID 26207414.
- Brummond, Kay; Hongfeng Chen; Peter Sill; Lingfeng You (2002). "A rhodium(I)-catalyzed formal allenic Alder ene reaction for the rapid and stereoselective assembly of cross-conjugated trienes". Journal of the American Chemical Society. 124 (51): 15186–15187. doi:10.1021/ja027588p. PMID 12487589. Wikidata Q78678119.

For comprehensive listing of publications, see: https://scholar.google.com/citations?user=6iI4MkEAAAAJ&hl=en
