= Hughesia =

Scientific classification
- Kingdom: Plantae
- Clade: Embryophytes
- Clade: Tracheophytes
- Clade: Angiosperms
- Clade: Eudicots
- Clade: Asterids
- Order: Asterales
- Family: Asteraceae
- Subfamily: Asteroideae
- Tribe: Eupatorieae
- Genus: Hughesia; R.M.King & H.Rob
- Species: H. reginae

Binomial name
- Hughesia reginae R.M.King & H.Rob

Species of plant

Hughesia is a genus of flowering plants in the family Asteraceae. There is only one known species, Hughesia reginae, native to the Junín Region of Peru. This species is named after the botanical illustrator, Regina Olson Hughes, in honor of her contributions to the U.S Department of Agriculture.
