= Nai-Chang Yeh =

American physicist

- 葉乃裳
- Born: 1961 (age 64–65)
- Education: National Taiwan University (BS); Massachusetts Institute of Technology (PhD)
- Scientific career
- Fields: Condensed matter physics
- Workplaces: California Institute of Technology; National Taiwan Normal University
- Thesis: Electronic and magnetic properties of graphite intercalation compounds (1988)
- Doctoral advisor: Mildred Dresselhaus
- Website: https://yehgroup.caltech.edu/

Nai-Chang Yeh (Chinese: 葉乃裳; born 1961) is a Taiwanese physicist specializing in experimental condensed matter physics. She is a chair professor at National Taiwan Normal University.

== Early life and education ==
She was born and raised in Chiayi, Taiwan. She graduated from National Taiwan University with a Bachelor of Science (B.S.) in 1983, then pursued doctoral studies in the United States. She earned her Ph.D. in physics from the Massachusetts Institute of Technology (MIT) in 1988.

In a personal statement on her life and career, Yeh has described her childhood intellectual and artistic curiosity leading her to excel academically. She credits her mother, a mathematics professor, and her Ph.D. supervisor Professor Mildred Dresselhaus as role models who helped to give her confidence in her ability to succeed in physics.

== Career and research ==
Her research emphasis is the fundamental physical properties of strongly correlated electronic systems. She is best known for her work on a variety of superconductors, magnetic materials, and superconductor/ferromagnet heterostructures. She is also interested in the physics and applications of low-dimensional electronic systems such as graphene and carbon nanotubes. She contributed to the development of a faster technique to produce high-quality graphene. Her experimental techniques include development of various cryogenic scanning probe microscopes for applications to nano-science and technology, as well as superconducting resonator technologies that have been applied to high-resolution studies of superfluid phase transitions and Bose–Einstein condensation in helium gas. She also works on exploring properties of topological insulators.

She is Professor of Physics and the Fletcher Jones Foundation Co-Director of the Kavli Nanoscience Institute at the California Institute of Technology. Yeh was the first female professor in that department when she joined in 1989. She is also part of the Caltech Institute for Quantum Information and Matter. She is currently a Chair Professor at National Taiwan Normal University.

== Awards and recognition ==
She has been recognized by a number of professional associations:

- Fellow, American Association for the Advancement of Science;
- Fellow, American Physical Society;
- Fellow and Chartered Physicist, The Institute of Physics, UK;
- David and Lucile Packard Fellow for Science and Engineering;
- Sloan Research Fellow;
- Academician, Academia Sinica

She was lauded in Time magazine on November 18, 1991, as a scientific "rising star" in California. She is cited in the American Men and Women of Science.
