= Elizabeth Ann Nalley =

American chemist

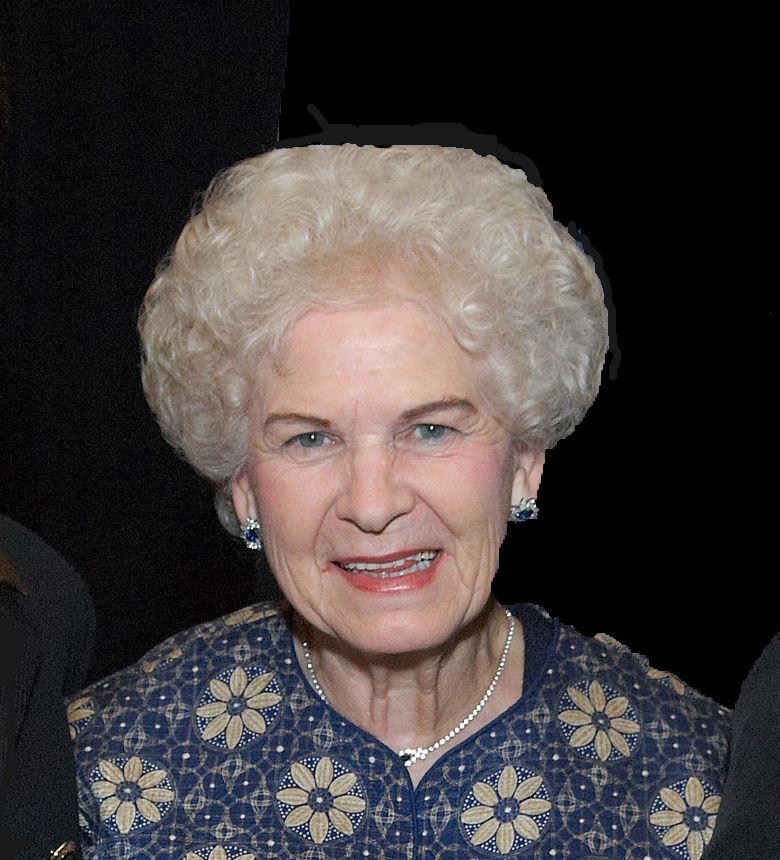
- Born: Catron, Missouri, U.S.
- Education: Northeastern State University, Oklahoma State University, Texas Woman's University
- Awards: Iota Sigma Pi Award in Professional Excellence (2005)
- Scientific career
- Fields: Chemistry
- Workplaces: Cameron University

Elizabeth Ann Nalley (also known as Ann Nalley) is an American chemist and professor of chemistry at Cameron University in Lawton, Oklahoma.

Nalley was born in July, 1942 at Catron, Missouri. She received a B.S. in chemical education from Northeastern State University in Tahlequah, Oklahoma, in 1965, an M.S. in analytical chemistry from Oklahoma State University in 1969, and a Ph.D. in radiation chemistry from Texas Woman's University in 1975. Her career as a chemistry instructor began before she finished her undergraduate education, with a stint as a chemistry teacher at Muskogee Central High School from 1964 to 1965. In 1969, she joined the Cameron University faculty as an instructor, and she has been a full professor (Cameron's first female full professor) since 1978.

Nalley has also served for 21 years on the board of directors of the honor society Phi Kappa Phi and was president from 1995 to 1998. In 2005, she was given the Iota Sigma Pi Award in Professional Excellence. She served as president of the American Chemical Society in 2006, and received the ACS Award for Encouraging Women into Careers in the Chemical Sciences in 2015.
