= Greg Timp =

Engineering professor

Gregory Timp

Gregory Louis Timp is a professor of Electrical Engineering and Biological Sciences at the University of Notre Dame. A graduate of the Massachusetts Institute of Technology, Timp has previously worked at Bell Laboratories and the University of Illinois Urbana-Champaign. He has worked with low temperature transport, nanostructure physics and, since 2000, research at the boundary between biology and nanoelectronics. He is a Fellow of the American Association for the Advancement of Science, the American Physical Society, the Institute of Electrical and Electronics Engineers.

== Sources ==
- Professor Gregory Timp, PhD , University of Notre Dame.
- Gregory Timp, University of Illinois at Urbana-Champaign
