= Weisz–Prater criterion =

Effects of pore diffusion on Rate of heterogeneous chemical reaction

The Weisz–Prater criterion is a method used to estimate the influence of pore diffusion on reaction rates in heterogeneous catalytic reactions. If the criterion is satisfied, pore diffusion limitations are negligible. The criterion is
$N_{W-P} = \dfrac{\mathfrak{R} R^2_p}{C_s D_{eff}} \le 3\beta$
Where $\mathfrak{R}$ is the reaction rate per volume of catalyst, $R_p$ is the catalyst particle radius, $C_s$ is the reactant concentration at the particle surface, and $D_{eff}$ is the effective diffusivity. Diffusion is usually in the Knudsen regime when average pore radius is less than 100 nm.
For a given effectiveness factor,$\eta$, and reaction order, n, the quantity $\beta$ is defined by the equation:
$\eta = \dfrac{3}{R^3_p} \int_{0}^{R_p} [1-\beta (1-r/R_p)^n] r^2\ dr$
for small values of beta this can be approximated using the binomial theorem:
$\eta = 1-\dfrac{n \beta}{4}$
Assuming $\eta = 0.95$ with a reaction order $n = 2$ gives value of $\beta$ equal to 0.1. Therefore, for many conditions, if $N_{W-P} \le 0.3$ then pore diffusion limitations can be excluded.
