= Herman, Nebraska =

Village in Washington County, Nebraska, United States

- Village
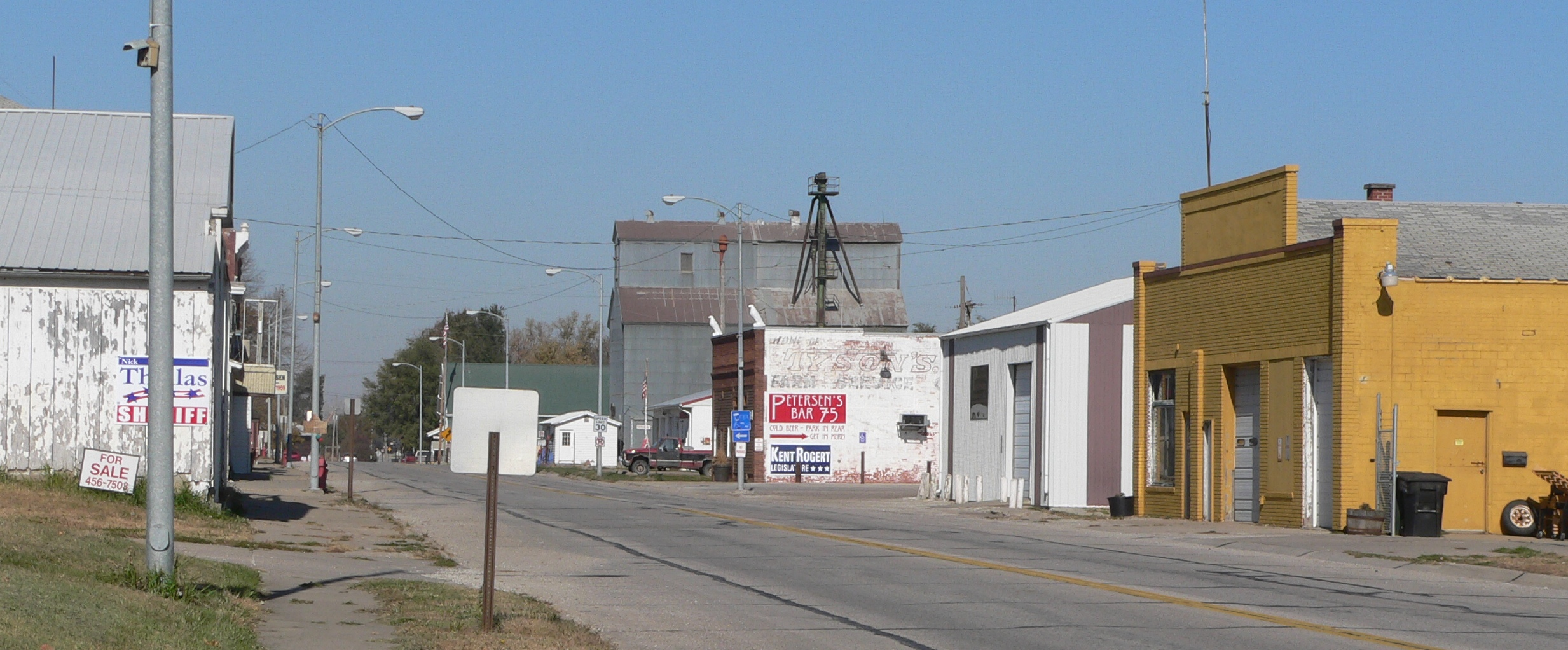
- Main Street (U.S. Route 75) in Herman, November 2010

- Location of Herman, Nebraska
- Coordinates: 41°40′26″N 96°13′00″W
- Country: United States
- State: Nebraska
- County: Washington

Area
  - Total: 0.14 sq mi (0.37 km^{2})
  - Land: 0.14 sq mi (0.37 km^{2})
  - Water: 0 sq mi (0.00 km^{2})
- Elevation: 1,043 ft (318 m)

Population (2020)
  - Total: 247
  - Density: 1,727.6/sq mi (667.02/km^{2})
- Time zone: UTC-6 (Central (CST))
  - Summer (DST): UTC-5 (CDT)
- ZIP code: 68029
- Area code: 402
- FIPS code: 31-22185
- GNIS feature ID: 2398492
- Website: villageofherman.gov

Herman is a village in Washington County, Nebraska, United States. As of the 2020 census, Herman had a population of 247.

== History ==
Herman was platted in 1871 when the railroad was extended to that point. It was named for Samuel Herman, a railroad employee.

On June 13, 1899, Herman was struck by a tornado that killed 13 people.

== Geography ==
According to the United States Census Bureau, the village has a total area of 0.14 square miles (0.36 km^{2}), all land.

== Demographics ==
Historical population
Census	Pop.	Note	%±
1880	95		—
1890	319		235.8%
1900	321		0.6%
1910	345		7.5%
1920	385		11.6%
1930	421		9.4%
1940	427		1.4%
1950	380		−11.0%
1960	335		−11.8%
1970	323		−3.6%
1980	340		5.3%
1990	186		−45.3%
2000	310		66.7%
2010	268		−13.5%
2020	247		−7.8%
U.S. Decennial Census

=== 2010 census ===
As of the census of 2010, there were 268 people, 116 households, and 74 families living in the village. The population density was 1,914.3 inhabitants per square mile (739.1/km^{2}). There were 134 housing units at an average density of 957.1 per square mile (369.5/km^{2}). The racial makeup of the village was 99.6% White and 0.4% Asian. Hispanic or Latino of any race were 1.1% of the population.

There were 116 households, of which 28.4% had children under the age of 18 living with them, 49.1% were married couples living together, 8.6% had a female householder with no husband present, 6.0% had a male householder with no wife present, and 36.2% were non-families. 31.9% of all households were made up of individuals, and 14.6% had someone living alone who was 65 years of age or older. The average household size was 2.31 and the average family size was 2.91.

The median age in the village was 41.3 years. 22.4% of residents were under the age of 18; 5.9% were between the ages of 18 and 24; 27.2% were from 25 to 44; 25.8% were from 45 to 64; and 18.7% were 65 years of age or older. The gender makeup of the village was 50.4% male and 49.6% female.

=== 2000 census ===
As of the census of 2000, there were 310 people, 134 households, and 86 families living in the village. The population density was 2,107.7 inhabitants per square mile (813.8/km^{2}). There were 151 housing units at an average density of 1,026.6 per square mile (396.4/km^{2}). The racial makeup of the village was 98.71% White, 0.65% Native American, and 0.65% from two or more races. Hispanic or Latino of any race were 1.29% of the population.

There were 134 households, out of which 26.9% had children under the age of 18 living with them, 55.2% were married couples living together, 5.2% had a female householder with no husband present, and 35.8% were non-families. 32.1% of all households were made up of individuals, and 16.4% had someone living alone who was 65 years of age or older. The average household size was 2.31 and the average family size was 2.93.

In the village, the population was spread out, with 23.5% under the age of 18, 8.7% from 18 to 24, 27.1% from 25 to 44, 23.2% from 45 to 64, and 17.4% who were 65 years of age or older. The median age was 38 years. For every 100 females, there were 110.9 males. For every 100 females age 18 and over, there were 107.9 males.

As of 2000 the median income for a household in the village was $38,750, and the median income for a family was $47,750. Males had a median income of $31,750 versus $20,795 for females. The per capita income for the village was $16,492. About 11.8% of families and 11.1% of the population were below the poverty line, including 21.4% of those under age 18 and 4.8% of those age 65 or over.

== Notable persons ==
- Kay M. Brummond grew up in Herman.
- Stanley M. Truhlsen grew up in Herman.

== See also ==
- List of municipalities in Nebraska
- Washington County Historical Association
