= Mildred Dresselhaus =

American physicist and nanotechnologist (1930–2017)

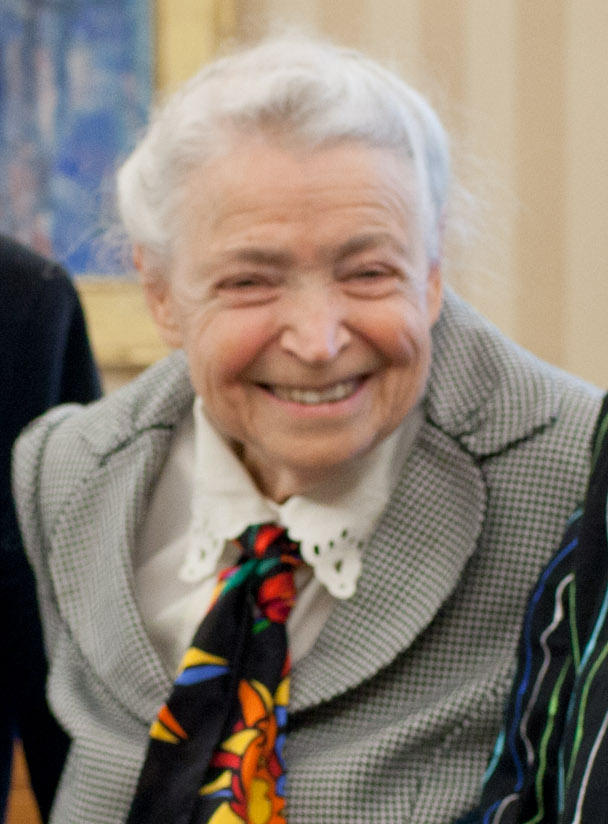
- Dresselhaus at the White House in 2012
- Born: Mildred Spiewak; November 11, 1930; Brooklyn, New York, U.S.
- Died: February 20, 2017 (aged 86); Cambridge, Massachusetts, U.S.
- Education: Hunter College; Cambridge University; Radcliffe College; University of Chicago
- Known for: Carbon nanotubes
- Spouses: Frederick Reif (divorced) Gene Dresselhaus (m. 1958)
- Awards: National Medal of Science (1990); IEEE Founders Medal (2004); Heinz Award in Technology, Economy, and Employment (2005); Harold Pender Award (2006); Oliver E. Buckley Condensed Matter Prize (2008); Oersted Medal (2008); Vannevar Bush Award (2009); Enrico Fermi Award (2012); Kavli Prize in Nanoscience (2012); Presidential Medal of Freedom (2014); National Inventors Hall of Fame (2014)
- Scientific career
- Fields: Applied physics
- Workplaces: Cornell University Massachusetts Institute of Technology
- Doctoral advisor: Enrico Fermi
- Doctoral students: Greg Timp; Nai-Chang Yeh; Deborah Chung

Mildred Spiewak Dresselhaus (née Spiewak; November 11, 1930 – February 20, 2017), known as the "Queen of Carbon Science", was an American physicist, materials scientist, and nanotechnologist. She was an Institute Professor and professor of both physics and electrical engineering at the Massachusetts Institute of Technology. She also served as the president of the American Physical Society, the chair of the American Association for the Advancement of Science, as well as the director of science in the US Department of Energy under the Bill Clinton Government. Dresselhaus won numerous awards including the Presidential Medal of Freedom, the National Medal of Science, the Enrico Fermi Award, the Kavli Prize and the Vannevar Bush Award.

== Early life and education ==
Dresselhaus was born on November 11, 1930, in Brooklyn, New York City, the daughter of Ethel (Teichtheil) and Meyer Spiewak, who were Polish Jewish immigrants. Her family was heavily affected by the Great Depression so from a young age Dresselhaus helped provide income for the family by doing piecework assembly tasks at home and by working in a zipper factory during the summer. As a grade school student, Dresselhaus' first 'teaching job' was tutoring a special-needs student for fifty cents a week, and she learned how to be a good teacher.

Dresselhaus credited New York's free museums, including the American Museum of Natural History and the Metropolitan Museum of Art, with sparking her interest in science. She and her brother, Irving Spiewak, were scholarship students at the Greenwich House Music School which introduced her to a different world of musical, artistic and intellectual leanings.

Dresselhaus was raised and attended grade school in the Bronx. Her older brother informed her of the opportunity to apply to Hunter College High School, where she excelled and gained practice as a teacher by tutoring fellow students.

=== Experience at Hunter College ===
Dresselhaus attended Hunter College in New York. During Dresselhaus's time as a student there, the formerly women's college's Bronx campus opened itself to a flood of male G.I. Bill beneficiaries. Dresselhaus later explained:

The boys in the science classes were toward the bottom of the class... They always used to come to me for help.... That might be somewhat significant in my story, because I never got the idea in college that science was a man's profession.

While attending Hunter, one of her professors, and future Nobel-Prize-winner Rosalyn Yalow took interest in Dresselhaus and encouraged her to apply for graduate fellowships and pursue a career in physics. Dresselhaus graduated with her undergraduate degree in liberal arts in 1951.

=== After college ===
She carried out postgraduate study at the University of Cambridge on a Fulbright Fellowship and received her MA from Radcliffe College. She received a PhD from the University of Chicago in 1958 where she studied under Nobel laureate Enrico Fermi. She then spent two years at Cornell University as a postdoc before moving to Lincoln Lab as a staff member.

== Career and legacy ==
Dresselhaus had a 57-year career at the Massachusetts Institute of Technology. She became the Abby Rockefeller Mauzé Visiting Professor of electrical engineering at MIT in 1967, became a tenured faculty member in 1968, and became a professor of physics in 1983. In 1985, she was appointed the first female institute professor at MIT. In 1994, Dresselhaus was one of 16 women faculty in the School of Science at MIT who drafted and co-signed a letter to the then-Dean of Science (now Chancellor of Berkeley) Robert Birgeneau, which started a campaign to highlight and challenge gender discrimination at MIT.

As the exotic compounds she studied became increasingly relevant to modern science and engineering, she was uniquely positioned to become a expert and write one of the standard textbooks. Her groundwork in the field led to Andre Geim and Konstantin Novoselov isolating and characterizing graphene, for which they were awarded the 2010 Nobel Prize.

Dresselhaus was awarded the National Medal of Science in 1990 in recognition of her work on electronic properties of materials as well as expanding the opportunities of women in science and engineering. In 2005 she was awarded the 11th Annual Heinz Award in the category of Technology, the Economy and Employment. In 2008, she was awarded the Oersted Medal. In 2012, she was co-recipient of the Enrico Fermi Award, along with Burton Richter, and was awarded the Kavli Prize "for her pioneering contributions to the study of phonons, electron-phonon interactions, and thermal transport in nanostructures." In 2014, she was awarded the Presidential Medal of Freedom and was inducted into the US National Inventors Hall of Fame in 2014. In 2015, she received the IEEE Medal of Honor.

In 2000–2001, she was the director of the Office of Science at the U.S. Department of Energy. From 2003 to 2008, she was the chair of the governing board of the American Institute of Physics. She also has served as president of the American Physical Society (APS), the first female president of the American Association for the Advancement of Science, and treasurer of the National Academy of Sciences.

Her former students include such notable materials scientists as Deborah Chung, and physicists as Nai-Chang Yeh and Greg Timp.

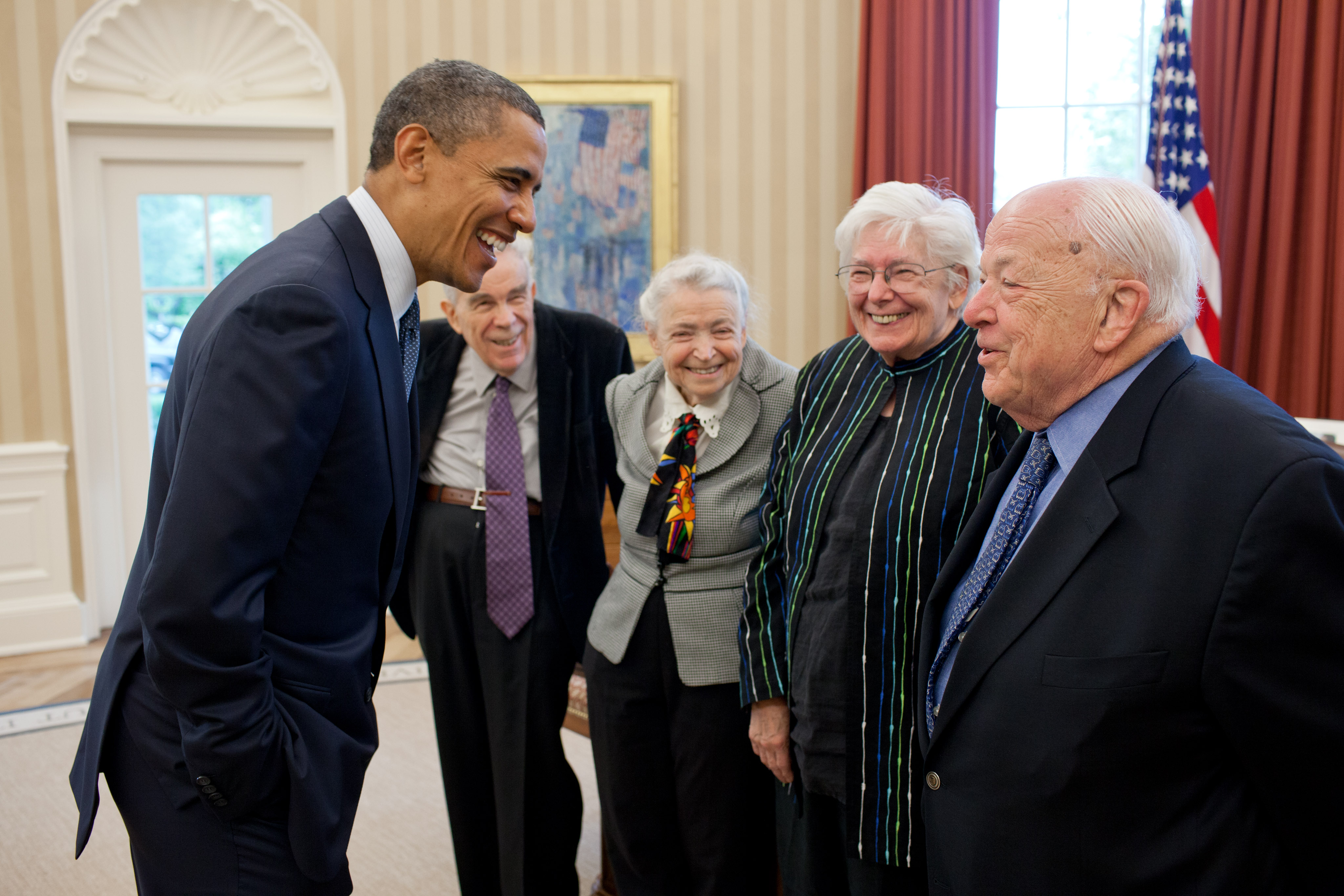
President Barack Obama greets Dr. Mildred Dresselhaus, third from right, and Dr. Burton Richter, right, May 7, 2012.

There are several physical theories named after Dresselhaus. The Hicks-Dresselhaus Model (L. D. Hicks and Dresselhaus) is the first basic model for low-dimensional thermoelectrics, which initiated the whole band field. The Saito-Fujita-Dresselhaus Model (Riichiro Saito, Mitsutaka Fujita, Gene Dresselhaus, and Mildred Dresselhaus) first predicted the band structures of carbon nanotubes. The Dresselhaus effect refers, however, to the spin–orbit interaction effect modeled by Gene Dresselhaus, Mildred Dresselhaus's husband.

Dresselhaus devoted a great deal of time to supporting efforts to promote increased participation of women in physics. In 1971, Dresselhaus and a colleague organized the first Women's Forum at MIT as a seminar exploring the roles of women in science and engineering. In honor of her legacy, the APS created the Millie Dresselhaus Fund to support women in physics. Dresselhaus was the face of a 2017 General Electric television advertisement which asked the question "What if female scientists were celebrities?" aimed to increase the number of women in STEM roles in its ranks.

In 2019, the Institute of Electrical and Electronics Engineers (IEEE) Board of Directors created the IEEE Mildred Dresselhaus Medal, awarded annually "for outstanding technical contributions in science and engineering, of great impact to IEEE fields of interest."

Oral history interview with Mildred Dresselhaus on the occasion of her winning the Presidential Medal of Freedom, the highest civilian honor bestowed by the U.S. government, in 2014

== Contributions to scientific knowledge ==
With the appearance of lasers in the 1960s, Dresselhaus started to use lasers for magneto-optics experiments, which later led to the creation of a new model for the electronic structure of graphite. A significant focus of her research was on 'buckyballs' and graphene as well.

Dresselhaus was particularly noted for her work on graphite, graphite intercalation compounds, fullerenes, carbon nanotubes, and low-dimensional thermoelectrics. Her group made frequent use of electronic band structure, Raman scattering and the photophysics of carbon nanostructures. Her research helped develop technology based on thin graphite which allow electronics to be "everywhere", including clothing and smartphones.

== Personal life ==
Her first husband was physicist Frederick Reif. She remarried in 1958 to Gene Dresselhaus who became a well known theoretician and discoverer of the Dresselhaus effect. They had four children – Marianne, Carl, Paul, and Eliot – and five grandchildren.

== Honors and awards ==
- Honorary Degree of Doctor of Science from the ETH Zurich, 2015
- IEEE Medal of Honor, 2015 (first female recipient)
- National Inventors Hall of Fame induction 2014
- Presidential Medal of Freedom, 2014
- Honorary Degree of Doctor of Science, The Hong Kong Polytechnic University, Hong Kong, 2013
- Von Hippel Award, Materials Research Society, 2013
- Kavli Prize in Nanoscience, 2012
- Enrico Fermi Award (second female recipient), 2012
- Vannevar Bush Award (second female recipient), 2009
- ACS Award for Encouraging Women into Careers in the Chemical Sciences, 2009
- Oliver E. Buckley Condensed Matter Prize, American Physical Society, 2008
- Oersted Medal, 2007
- L'Oréal-UNESCO Awards for Women in Science, 2007
- Heinz Award for Technology, the Economy and Employment, 2005
- IEEE Founders Medal Recipients, 2004
- Karl Taylor Compton Medal for Leadership in Physics, American Institute of Physics, 2001
- Medal of Achievement in Carbon Science and Technology, American Carbon Society, 2001
- Honorary member of the Ioffe Institute, Russian Academy of Sciences, St. Petersburg, Russia, 2000
- National Materials Advancement Award of the Federation of Materials Societies, 2000
- Honorary doctorate from the Catholic University of Leuven, Belgium, February 2000
- Nicholson Medal, American Physical Society, March 2000
- Weizmann Institute's Millennial Lifetime Achievement Award, June 2000
- SGL Carbon Award, American Carbon Society, 1997
- Member of the American Philosophical Society, 1995
- Honorary Doctorate of Science, Princeton University, 1992
- National Medal of Science, 1990
- Member of the National Academy of Sciences (U.S.), 1985
- Member of the American Academy of Arts and Sciences, 1974
- Society of Women Engineers Achievement Award, 1977
- Fellow, Norwegian Academy of Science and Letters

== Selected publications ==
- Steinbeck, J.; Braunstein, G.; Speck, J.; Dresselhaus, M. S.; Huang, C. Y.; Malvezzi, A. M.; Bloembergen, N. (1986). "Analysis of Picosecond Pulsed Laser Melted Graphite". MRS Proceedings. 74 263. Springer Science and Business Media LLC. doi:10.1557/proc-74-263. ISSN 0272-9172. OSTI 6973903.
- di Vittorio, S.L.; Dresselhaus, M.S.; Endo, M.; Issi, J-P.; Piraux, L. (July 1, 1990). The transport properties of activated carbon fibers (Report). Office of Scientific and Technical Information (OSTI). doi:10.2172/6882792.
- Kuriyama, K.; Dresselhaus, M.S. (1991). "Photoconductivity of activated carbon fibers". Journal of Materials Research. 6 (5). Springer Science and Business Media LLC: 1040–1047. Bibcode:1991JMatR...6.1040K. doi:10.1557/jmr.1991.1040. ISSN 0884-2914. S2CID 94864974.
- Farmer, J.C.; Barbee, T.W. Jr.; Chapline, G.C. Jr.; Olsen, M.L.; Foreman, R.J.; Summers, L.J.; Dresselhaus, M.S.; Hicks, L.D. (January 20, 1995). Synthesis and evaluation of single layer, bilayer, and multilayer thermoelectric thin films (Report). Office of Scientific and Technical Information (OSTI). doi:10.2172/93595.
- M. S. Dresselhaus & P. C. Eklund (2000). "Phonons in carbon nanotubes" (PDF). Advances in Physics. 49 (6): 705. Bibcode:2000AdPhy..49..705D. doi:10.1080/000187300413184. S2CID 122447852. Archived from the original (PDF) on January 9, 2007.
- Dresselhaus, M.S.; Samsonidze, Ge.G.; Chou, S.G.; Dresselhaus, G.; Jiang, J.; Saito, R.; Jorio, A. (2005). "Recent advances in carbon nanotube photophysics". Physica E: Low-dimensional Systems and Nanostructures. 29 (3–4): 443–446. Bibcode:2005PhyE...29..443D. doi:10.1016/j.physe.2005.06.007.
- M. S. Dresselhaus & G. Dresselhaus (2002). "Intercalation Compounds of Graphite" (PDF). Advances in Physics. 51 (1): 1. Bibcode:2002AdPhy..51....1D. doi:10.1080/00018730110113644. S2CID 123597602. Archived from the original (PDF) on January 9, 2007.
- M. S. Dresselhaus (2004). "Big Opportunities for Small Objects". Materials Today. 5 (11): 48. doi:10.1016/S1369-7021(02)01164-1.
- M. S. Dresselhaus, G. Dresselhaus and A. Jorio (2004). "Unusual Properties and Structures of Carbon Nanotubes" (PDF). Annual Review of Materials Research. 34 (1): 247. Bibcode:2004AnRMS..34..247D. doi:10.1146/annurev.matsci.34.040203.114607. Archived from the original (PDF) on January 11, 2006.
- M. S. Dresselhaus; G. Dresselhaus; R. Saito; A. Jorio (2005). "Raman Spectroscopy of Carbon Nanotubes" (PDF). Physics Reports. 409 (2): 47. Bibcode:2005PhR...409...47D. doi:10.1016/j.physrep.2004.10.006. Archived from the original (PDF) on January 9, 2007.
- M. S. Dresselhaus & H. Dai (2004). "Carbon Nanotubes: Continued Innovations and Challenges". MRS Bulletin. 29 (4): 237. doi:10.1557/mrs2004.74.
- J. Heremans & M. S. Dresselhaus (2005). "Low Dimensional Thermoelectricity" (PDF). CRC Handbook - Molecular and Nano-electronics: Concepts, Challenges, and Designs. 108 (4): 609. Bibcode:2005AcPPA.108..609H. doi:10.12693/APhysPolA.108.609. Archived from the original (PDF) on January 9, 2007.
- M. S. Dresselhaus, R. Saito and A. Jorio (2004). "Semiconducting Carbon Nanotubes" (PDF). Proceedings of ICPS-27. Archived from the original (PDF) on January 9, 2007.
- S. G. Chou; F. Plentz-Filho; J. Jiang; R. Saito; D. Nezich; H. B. Ribeiro; A. Jorio; M. A. Pimenta; G. Samsonidze; A. P. Santos; M. Zheng; G. B. Onoa; E. D. Semke; G. Dresselhaus; M. S. Dresselhaus (2005). "Photo-excited Electron Relaxation Process Observed in Photoluminescence Spectroscopy of DNA-wrapped Carbon Nanotube". Physical Review Letters. 94 (12) 127402. Bibcode:2005PhRvL..94l7402C. doi:10.1103/PhysRevLett.94.127402. PMID 15903960.
- M. S. Dresselhaus (2004). "Nanotubes: a step in synthesis". Nature Materials. 3 (10): 665–6. Bibcode:2004NatMa...3..665D. doi:10.1038/nmat1232. PMID 15467687. S2CID 29431916.
- M. S. Dresselhaus (2004). "Applied Physics: Nanotube Antennas". Nature Materials. 432 (7020): 959–60. Bibcode:2004Natur.432..959D. doi:10.1038/432959a. PMID 15616541. S2CID 37208770.
- S. B. Fagan; A. G. Souza-Filho; J. Mendes-Filho; P. Corio; M. S. Dresselhaus (2005). "Electronic Properties of Ag- and CrO3-filled Single-wall Carbon Nanotubes" (PDF). Chemical Physics Letters. 406 (1–3): 54. Bibcode:2005CPL...406...54F. doi:10.1016/j.cplett.2005.02.091. Archived from the original (PDF) on January 9, 2007.
- Y. A. Kim; H. Muramatsu; T. Hayashi; M. Endo; M. Terrones; M. S. Dresselhaus (2004). "Thermal Stability and Structural Changes of Double-walled Carbon Nanotubes by Heat Treatment" (PDF). Chemical Physics Letters. 398 (1–3): 87. Bibcode:2004CPL...398...87K. doi:10.1016/j.cplett.2004.09.024. Archived from the original (PDF) on January 9, 2007.
- G. Samsonidze; R. Saito; N. Kobayashi; A. Gruneis; J. Jiang; A. Jorio; S. G. Chou; G. Dresselhaus; M. S. Dresselhaus (2004). "Family Behavior of the Optical Transition Energies in Single-wall Carbon Nanotubes of Smaller Diameters" (PDF). Applied Physics Letters. 85 (23): 5703. Bibcode:2004ApPhL..85.5703S. doi:10.1063/1.1829160. Archived from the original (PDF) on January 11, 2006.
- S. G. Chou; H. B. Ribeiro; E. Barros; A. P. Santos; D. Nezich; G. Samsonidze; C. Fantini; M. A. Pimenta; A. Jorio; F. Pletz-Filho; M. S. Dresselhaus; G. Dresselhaus; R. Saito; M. Zheng; G. B. Onoa; E. D. Semke; A. K. Swan; B. B. Goldberg; M. S. Unlu (2004). "Optical Characterization of DNA-wrapped Carbon Nanotube Hybrids" (PDF). Chemical Physics Letters. 397 (4–6): 296. Bibcode:2004CPL...397..296C. doi:10.1016/j.cplett.2004.08.117. Archived from the original (PDF) on January 11, 2006.
- E. I. Rogacheva; O. N. Nashchekina; A. V. Meriuts; S. G. Lyubchenko; O. Vekhov; M. S. Dresselhaus; G. Dresselhaus (2005). "Quantum Size Effects in PbTe/SnTe/PbTe Heterostructures". Applied Physics Letters. 86 (6): 063103. Bibcode:2005ApPhL..86f3103R. doi:10.1063/1.1862338.
- H. Son; Y. Hori; S. G. Chou; D. Nezich; G. Samsonidze; E. Barros; G. Dresselhaus; M. S. Dresselhaus (2004). "Environment Effects on the Raman Spectra of Individual Single-wall Carbon Nanotubes: Suspended and Grown on Polycrystalline Silicon" (PDF). Applied Physics Letters. 85 (20): 4744. Bibcode:2004ApPhL..85.4744S. doi:10.1063/1.1818739. Archived from the original (PDF) on January 9, 2007.
- C. Fantini; A. Jorio; M. Souza; A. J. Mai Jr.; M. S. Strano; M. A. Pimenta; M. S. Dresselhaus (2004). "Optical Transition Energies and Radial Breathing Modes for HiPco Carbon Nanotubes from Raman Spectroscopy" (PDF). Physical Review Letters. 93 (14) 147406. Bibcode:2004PhRvL..93n7406F. doi:10.1103/PhysRevLett.93.147406. PMID 15524844. Archived from the original (PDF) on January 9, 2007.
- S. B. Cronin; A. K. Swan; M. S. Unlu; B. B. Goldberg; M. S. Dresselhaus; M. Tinkham (2004). "Measuring Uniaxial Strain in Individual Single-wall Carbon Nanotubes: Resonance Raman Spectra of AFM Modified SWNTs" (PDF). Physical Review Letters. 93 (16) 167401. Bibcode:2004PhRvL..93p7401C. doi:10.1103/PhysRevLett.93.167401. PMID 15525030. Archived from the original (PDF) on January 11, 2006.
