= Gene Dresselhaus =

American condensed matter physicist (1929–2021)

Gene Frederick Dresselhaus (November 7, 1929, in Ancón, Panama – September 29, 2021, in California) was an American condensed matter physicist. He is known as a pioneer of spintronics and for his 1955 discovery of the eponymous Dresselhaus effect.

== Biography ==
Dresselhaus studied physics at University of California, Berkeley, receiving his bachelor's degree in 1951 and his doctorate in 1955. At Berkeley he worked under the supervision of Charles Kittel and Arthur F. Kip on early cyclotron resonance experiments on semiconductors and semimetals. As a postdoc Dresselhaus was for the academic year 1955–1956 an instructor at the University of Chicago. From 1956 to 1960 he was an assistant professor at Cornell University. He was also a consultant to General Electric Research Laboratories from 1956 to 1960 and to the Oak Ridge National Laboratory from 1958 to 1960. From 1960 he worked at the Lincoln Laboratory of the Massachusetts Institute of Technology (MIT) and from 1977 at the Francis Bitter National Magnetic Laboratory of MIT. He was also a professor of physics at MIT.

He did research on carbon nanotubes, fullerenes, electronic energy bands in solids, surface impedance of metals, excitons in insulators, electronic surface states, optical properties of solids, and high-temperature superconductivity.

In 1958 he married the physicist Mildred Dresselhaus (née Spiewak) — for many years the couple extensively collaborated and published their scientific findings. They had a daughter and three sons.

== Honors and awards ==
He was elected in 1966 a Fellow of the American Physical Society.

In 2022 he shared the Oliver E. Buckley Condensed Matter Prize with Emmanuel I. Rashba for "pioneering research on spin-orbit coupling in crystals, particularly the foundational discovery of chiral spin-orbit interactions, which continue to enable new developments in spin transport and topological materials." His death in 2021 shortly preceded the announcement of the prize.

== Selected publications ==
=== Articles ===
- Dresselhaus, M.S.; Dresselhaus, G. (1981). "Intercalation compounds of graphite". Advances in Physics. 30 (2): 139–326. Bibcode:1981AdPhy..30..139D. doi:10.1080/00018738100101367.
- Saito, R.; Fujita, M.; Dresselhaus, G.; Dresselhaus, M. S. (1992). "Electronic structure of chiral graphene tubules". Applied Physics Letters. 60 (18): 2204–2206. Bibcode:1992ApPhL..60.2204S. doi:10.1063/1.107080.
- Nakada, Kyoko; Fujita, Mitsutaka; Dresselhaus, Gene; Dresselhaus, Mildred S. (1996). "Edge state in graphene ribbons: Nanometer size effect and edge shape dependence". Physical Review B. 54 (24): 17954–17961. Bibcode:1996PhRvB..5417954N. doi:10.1103/PhysRevB.54.17954. PMID 9985930.
- Rao, A. M.; Richter, E.; Bandow, Shunji; Chase, Bruce; Eklund, P. C.; Williams, K. A.; Fang, S.; Subbaswamy, K. R.; Menon, M.; Thess, A.; Smalley, R. E.; Dresselhaus, G.; Dresselhaus, M. S. (1997). "Diameter-Selective Raman Scattering from Vibrational Modes in Carbon Nanotubes". Science. 275 (5297): 187–191. doi:10.1126/science.275.5297.187. PMID 8985007. S2CID 25200479.
- Dresselhaus, M.S.; Dresselhaus, G.; Jorio, A.; Souza Filho, A.G.; Saito, R. (2002). "Raman spectroscopy on isolated single wall carbon nanotubes". Carbon. 40 (12): 2043–2061. doi:10.1016/S0008-6223(02)00066-0.
- Dresselhaus, M.S.; Dresselhaus, G.; Saito, R.; Jorio, A. (2005). "Raman spectroscopy of carbon nanotubes". Physics Reports. 409 (2): 47–99. Bibcode:2005PhR...409...47D. doi:10.1016/j.physrep.2004.10.006.
- Pimenta, M. A.; Dresselhaus, G.; Dresselhaus, M. S.; Cançado, L. G.; Jorio, A.; Saito, R.; Saito, R. (2007). "Studying disorder in graphite-based systems by Raman spectroscopy". Phys. Chem. Chem. Phys. 9 (11): 1276–1290. Bibcode:2007PCCP....9.1276P. doi:10.1039/B613962k. PMID 17347700.
- Malard, L.M.; Pimenta, M.A.; Dresselhaus, G.; Dresselhaus, M.S. (2009). "Raman spectroscopy in graphene". Physics Reports. 473 (5–6): 51–87. Bibcode:2009PhR...473...51M. doi:10.1016/j.physrep.2009.02.003.

=== Books ===
- Dresselhaus, Mildred S.; Dresselhaus, Gene; Sugihara, Ko; Spain, Ian L.; Goldberg, Harris A. (8 March 2013). Graphite Fibers and Filaments. Springer Series in Material Science 5. ISBN 9783642833793. (1st edition 1988)
- Dresselhaus, M. S.; Dresselhaus, G.; Eklund, P. C. (20 March 1996). Science of Fullerenes and Carbon Nanotubes: Their Properties and Applications. Elsevier. ISBN 9780080540771.
- Dresselhaus, Mildred; Dresselhaus, Gene; Avouris, Phaeton, eds. (July 2003). Carbon Nanotubes: Synthesis, Structure, Properties, and Applications. Springer. ISBN 9783540399476. (1st edition 2001)
- Dresselhaus, Mildred S.; Dresselhaus, Gene; Jorio, Ado (18 December 2007). Group Theory: Application to the Physics of Condensed Matter. Springer. ISBN 9783540328995.
- Jorio, Ado; Dresselhaus, Mildred S.; Saito, Riichiro; Dresselhaus, Gene (24 August 2011). Raman Spectroscopy in Graphene Related Systems. Wiley-VCH. ISBN 9783527643905.
- Dresselhaus, Mildred; Dresselhaus, Gene; Cronin, Stephen; Souza Filho, Antonio Gomez (17 January 2018). Solid State Properties: From Bulk to Nano. Springer. ISBN 9783662559222.
