= Geiparvarin =

Names
- Preferred IUPAC name 7-{[(2E)-3-(5,5-Dimethyl-4-oxo-4,5-dihydrofuran-2-yl)but-2-en-1-yl]oxy}-2H-1-benzopyran-2-one

Identifiers
CAS Number	36413-91-9
3D model (JSmol)	Interactive image; Interactive image
ChemSpider	4743982
MeSH	Geiparvarin
PubChem CID	5910585
UNII	O0M5JB2L95
CompTox Dashboard (EPA)	DTXSID201026772
- InChI: InChI=1S/C19H18O5/c1-12(15-11-17(20)19(2,3)24-15)8-9-22-14-6-4-13-5-7-18(21)23-16(13)10-14/h4-8,10-11H,9H2,1-3H3/b12-8+ Key: OUTLLBZGJYDUQE-XYOKQWHBSA-N; InChI=1/C19H18O5/c1-12(15-11-17(20)19(2,3)24-15)8-9-22-14-6-4-13-5-7-18(21)23-16(13)10-14/h4-8,10-11H,9H2,1-3H3/b12-8+ Key: OUTLLBZGJYDUQE-XYOKQWHBBW
- SMILES: CC(=CCOC1=CC2=C(C=C1)C=CC(=O)O2)C3=CC(=O)C(O3)(C)C; O=C/3Oc2c(ccc(OC/C=C(/C=1OC(C(=O)C=1)(C)C)C)c2)\C=C\3

Properties
Chemical formula	C_{19}H_{18}O_{5}
Molar mass	326.343 g/mol
Density	1.242 g/mL
Boiling point	533 °C (991 °F; 806 K)
- Except where otherwise noted, data are given for materials in their standard state (at 25 °C [77 °F], 100 kPa). verify (what is ?) Infobox references

Geiparvarin is a coumarin derivative found in the leaves of the Australian Willow (Geijera parviflora). It is a monoamine oxidase inhibitor.

Several analogues of geiparvarin have been studied for antitumor properties.
