= Furanomycin =

Names
- Systematic IUPAC name (S)-Amino[(2R,5S)-5-methyl-2,5-dihydrofuran-2-yl]acetic acid

Identifiers
CAS Number	18455-25-9
3D model (JSmol)	Interactive image
ChEBI	CHEBI:79390
ChemSpider	66136
PubChem CID	73423
UNII	218WD6K9H0
- InChI: InChI=1S/C7H11NO3/c1-4-2-3-5(11-4)6(8)7(9)10/h2-6H,8H2,1H3,(H,9,10)/t4-,5+,6-/m0/s1 Key: PNOKUGWGMLEAPE-JKUQZMGJSA-N; InChI=1/C7H11NO3/c1-4-2-3-5(11-4)6(8)7(9)10/h2-6H,8H2,1H3,(H,9,10)/t4-,5+,6-/m0/s1 Key: PNOKUGWGMLEAPE-JKUQZMGJBF
- SMILES: C[C@H]1C=C[C@@H](O1)[C@@H](C(=O)O)N

Properties
Chemical formula	C_{7}H_{11}NO_{3}
Molar mass	157.169 g·mol^{−1}
Density	1.238 g/mL
- Except where otherwise noted, data are given for materials in their standard state (at 25 °C [77 °F], 100 kPa). verify (what is ?) Infobox references

Furanomycin is an isoleucine—tRNA ligase inhibitor.
