= List of biochemists =

This is a list of biochemists. It should include those who have been important to the development or practice of biochemistry. Their research or applications have made significant contributions in the area of basic or applied biochemistry.

== A ==
=== Ab–Ah ===
- John Jacob Abel (1857–1938). American biochemist and pharmacologist. He founded and chaired the first department of pharmacology in the United States at the University of Michigan.
- Robert Abeles (1926–2000). American biological chemist at Brandeis University. Member Natl. Acad. Sci. USA.
- John Abelson (b. 1938). American biologist at Caltech, with expertise in biophysics, biochemistry, and genetics, and known for work on RNA splicing.
- Sir Edward Abraham CBE, FRS (1913–1999). English biochemist at the University of Oxford involved in the development of penicillin and cephalosporin
- Gary Ackers (1939–2011). American Professor of Biochemistry and Molecular Biophysics at Washington University in St. Louis, who worked on thermodynamic linkage analysis of biological macromolecules.
- Gilbert Smithson Adair FRS (1896–1979). British protein chemist at the University of Cambridge, the first to identify cooperative binding, in the context of oxygen binding to haemoglobin.
- Julius Adler (1930–2024). American Professor of Biochemistry and Genetics at the University of Wisconsin–Madison, known for work on chemotaxis.
- David Agard (20th–21st century). American Professor of Biochemistry and Biophysics at UC San Francisco, whose research is focussed on understanding the basic principles of macromolecular structure and function. Member Natl. Acad. Sci. USA.
- Natalie Ahn (PhD 1985). Professor of Chemistry and Biochemistry at the University of Colorado at Boulder, whose research is focussed on understanding the mechanisms of cell signalling, with a speciality in phosphorylation and cancers. Member Natl. Acad. Sci. USA.

=== Al–Am ===
- Bruce Alberts (b. 1938). American biochemist at UC San Francisco, known for his work on protein complexes that enable chromosome replication in science, public policy, and as an original author of the textbook Molecular Biology of the Cell. Member Natl. Acad. Sci. USA.
- Robert Alberty (1921–2014). American physical biochemist at MIT, noted for many contributions to enzyme kinetics, including early studies of reactions with two substrates. Member Natl. Acad. Sci. USA.
- Dario Alessi (b. 1967). British biochemist at the University of Dundee known for work on protein kinases.
- Mary Belle Allen (1922–1973). American botanist at UC Berkeley known for demonstrating the role of chloroplasts in photosynthesis.
- Jorge Allende (b. 1934). Chilean biochemist at the University of Chile, known for contributions to the understanding of protein biosynthesis and how transfer RNA is generated. Member Natl. Acad. Sci. USA.
- C. David Allis (1951–2023), US biologist at the Rockefeller University who worked on chromatin.
- Richard Amasino (b. 1956). American Professor of Biochemistry and Genetics at the University of Wisconsin–Madison, who studies vernalization. Member Natl. Acad. Sci. USA.
- Bruce Ames (1928–2024). Biochemist and microbiologist at UC Berkeley. He is an expert on mutagenicity and an inventor of the Ames test. Awarded the National Medal of Science
- John E. Amoore (1939–1998). British biochemist and zoologist at UC Berkeley, who postulated the stereochemical theory of olfaction.

=== An–At ===
- Rudolph John Anderson (1879–1961). American biochemist graduated with a PhD from Cornell University Medical College. Member Natl. Acad. Sci. USA.
- Thomas F. Anderson (1911–1991). American biophysical chemist and geneticist at the University of Pennsylvania, a pioneer in applying electron microscopy to bacteria and viruses. Member Natl. Acad. Sci. USA.
- Mortimer Louis Anson (1901–1968). American biochemist and protein chemist, the first to propose that protein folding was reversible.
- Akira Arimura (1923–2007). Japanese biochemist and endocrinologist at Tulane University who studied hormones.
- Shy Arkin (b. 1965). Israeli biochemist at the Hebrew University of Jerusalem, working on structural analysis of transmembrane proteins
- Judy Armitage FRS (b. 1951). British biochemist at Oxford University, working on motion of bacteria by flagellar rotation.
- Frances Arnold (b. 1956). American biochemist and biochemical engineer at Caltech, pioneer of the use of directed evolution to engineer enzymes. Nobel Prize for Chemistry (2018). Member Natl. Acad. Sci. USA.
- Ruth Arnon (b. 1933) Israeli biochemist at the Weizmann Institute, who works on researching anti-cancer and influenza vaccinations. She participated in developing the multiple sclerosis drug Copaxone. President of the Israel Academy of Sciences and Humanities.
- Helen Asemota (20th–21st century). Nigerian biochemist at the University of the West Indies, Jamaica, who studied the molecular genetics and metabolism of the browning of yam tubers in storage.
- Gilbert Ashwell (1916–2014). American biochemist at the NIH, who isolated the first cell receptor.
- William Astbury FRS (1898–1961). British physicist and molecular biologist at the Royal Institution, University of Leeds, a pioneer in applying X-ray crystallography to biological molecules such as proteins
- Daniel Atkinson (1921–2024). American biochemist at UCLA known for the concept of energy charge

== B ==
=== Ba–Bee ===
- David Baker (b. 1962). American biochemist and computational biologist at the University of Washington, who studies methods to predict and design the three-dimensional structures of proteins. Nobel Prize in chemistry, 2024.
- Tania A. Baker (PhD 1988). American biochemist at MIT, who has studied transposons and enzymes that catalyse protein unfolding. Member Natl. Acad. Sci. USA.
- Clinton Ballou (1923–2021). American biochemist at UC Berkeley, whose research focused on the metabolism of carbohydrates and the structures of microbial cell walls. Member Natl. Acad. Sci. USA.
- Horace Barker (1907–2000). American biochemist and microbiologist at UC Berkeley. Member Natl. Acad. Sci. USA.
- David Bartel (PhD 1993). American biochemist at MIT, known for work on microRNA biology. Member Natl. Acad. Sci. USA.
- Bonnie Bassler (b. 1962). American molecular biologist at Princeton, known for studies of quorum sensing, and the idea that disruption of chemical signalling can be used as an antimicrobial therapy. Member Natl. Acad. Sci. USA.
- Philip A. Beachy (b. 1958). American biochemist at Stanford, known for studies to understand the molecular mechanisms behind the growth of multicellular embryos, especially the role of the Hedgehog signalling pathway. Member Natl. Acad. Sci. USA.
- Jon Beckwith (b. 1935). American microbiologist and geneticist at Harvard who made important contributions to the study of bacterial genetics. Member Natl. Acad. Sci. USA.

=== Bee–Ber ===
- Lorena S. Beese(20th–21st century). Biochemist at Duke University, known for structural biochemistry of DNA replication and protein prenylation enzymes. Member Natl. Acad. Sci. USA.
- Helmut Beinert (1913–2007). German born-American biochemist at the University of Wisconsin–Madison, a pioneer of and advocate for the use of electron paramagnetic resonance in biological systems. Member Natl. Acad. Sci. USA.
- Marlene Belfort (b. 1945). American biochemist at the New York State Department of Health involved in the discovery of self-splicing introns in bacteriophage. Member Natl. Acad. Sci. USA.
- Boris Pavlovich Belousov (1893–1970). Chemist and biophysicist in the Ministry of Health of the USSR who discovered the Belousov–Zhabotinsky reaction. Awarded the Lenin Prize (1980).
- Myron L. Bender (1924–1988). American biochemist at Northwestern University, who pioneered mechanistic studies of enzymes, especially chymotrypsin and other proteases. Member Natl. Acad. Sci. USA.
- Stephen J. Benkovic (b. 1938). American bioorganic chemist at Pennsylvania State University. Member Natl. Acad. Sci. USA.
- Steven A. Benner (b. 1954). American chemist at the University of Florida known for establishing synthetic biology and paleogenetics, aas wll as contributing to understanding of the origin of life;
- Paul Berg FRS (foreign member) (1926–2023). American biochemist at Stanford, known for pioneering work involving gene splicing of recombinant DNA. He was awarded the Nobel Prize in Chemistry in 1980.
- Helen M. Berman (b. 1943). American biochemist at Rutgers University, known for work on nucleic acids, their interactions with proteins, and also the structure of collagen.
- Claude Bernard (1813–1878). French physiologist and physician (early biochemist) at the Collège de France, Paris. Introduced concept of homeostasis (given that name by Walter Cannon). Foreign member of the Royal Swedish Academy of Sciences.
- Carolyn Bertozzi (b. 1966). American chemist known for her work spanning chemistry and biology. Nobel Prize in Chemistry, 2022.

=== Bi–Bo ===
- Klaus Biemann (1926–2016). Austrian chemist at MIT, the "father of organic mass spectrometry" and particularly noted for his role in advancing protein sequencing with tandem mass spectrometry. Member Natl. Acad. Sci. USA.
- Ethel Ronzoni Bishop (1890–1975). American biochemist and physiologist at Washington University in St. Louis who studied carbohydrate metabolism.
- Pamela J. Bjorkman (b. 1956). American biochemist at Caltech, who studies immune recognition of viral pathogens. Member Natl. Acad. Sci. USA.
- Elizabeth Blackburn AC FRS FAA FRSN (b. 1948). Australian-American biochemist, Nobel Laureate, co-discoverer of telomerase.
- Konrad Emil Bloch FRS (1912–2000). German-American biochemist at Harvard, who worked on the mechanism and regulation of cholesterol and fatty acid metabolism. Nobel Prize in Physiology or Medicine 1964.
- Elkan Blout (1919–2006). American biochemist at Harvard, who worked on peptide structure and conformation, including cyclic peptides. Member Natl. Acad. Sci. USA.
- David Mervyn Blow FRS (1931–2004). British X-ray crystallographer at Imperial College London, who worked on protein structure.
- Tom Blundell, FRS (b. 1942). British biochemist at the University of Cambridge, structural biologist, and science administrator.
- Aaron Bodansky (1887–1960). Russian-born American biochemist at the Hospital for Joint Diseases, New York, specializing in the area of calcium metabolism.
- Paul D. Boyer (1918–2018). American biochemist, at UCLA who studied ATP synthase. Nobel Prize in Chemistry in 1997. Member Natl. Acad. Sci. USA.

=== Br ===
- Roscoe Brady (1923–2016). American biochemist at the National Institute of Neurological Disorders and Stroke, who identified many enzyme defects responsible for metabolic diseases. Member Natl. Acad. Sci. USA.
- Herman Branson (1914–1995). American physicist and biochemist who participated at Caltech in the discovery of the α-helix
- Sydney Brenner (1927–2019). South African biochemist at Cambridge, and later Berkeley, known for work on the genetic code and more recently for establishing Caenorhabditis elegans as a model organism. Nobel prize in Physiology or Medicine (2002)
- Roger Brent (b. 1955). American molecular biologist at the University of Washington known for work on gene regulation and systems biology
- Kenneth Breslauer (b. 1947). American biochemist at Rutgers University (born in Sweden of German parents), who has studied DNA damage and repair, including why certain mutations escape repair and result in cancer.
- Bernard Brodie (1907–1989). American biochemist and pharmacologist at the National Heart Institute, regarded as the founder of modern pharmacology. He studied drug metabolism and the mechanisms of drug effects. Member Natl. Acad. Sci. USA.
- Adrian John Brown FRS (1852–1920). British expert on brewing and malting at the University of Birmingham. He was a pioneer of enzyme kinetics and proposed an explanation of enzyme saturation.
- Patrick O. Brown (b. 1954). American biochemist at Stanford. Among numerous advances in experimental techniques he has developed experimental methods for using DNA microarrays to investigate the basic principles of genome organization. Member Natl. Acad. Sci. USA.
- Thomas Bruice (1925–2019). American bioorganic chemist at UC Santa Barbara, pioneering researcher in chemical biology. Member Natl. Acad. Sci. USA.

=== Bu ===
- John Buchanan (1917–2007). American biochemist at MIT, best known for his research on the biosynthesis of purines. Member Natl. Acad. Sci. USA.
- Eduard Buchner (1860–1917). German chemist and physiologist at LMU Munich, who overthrew the doctrine of vitalism by showing that cell-free yeast extract could catalyse fermentation, a discovery described by Arthur Kornberg as the beginning of biochemistry. 1907 Nobel Prize in Chemistry.
- Dean Burk (1904–1988). American biochemist at the Fixed Nitrogen Research Laboratory, co-discoverer of biotin. He is credited (with Hans Lineweaver) with introducing the double-reciprocal plot in kinetics. He became a vociferous opponent of water fluoridation.
- Robert H. Burris (1914–2010). American biochemist at the University of Wisconsin–Madison, expert on nitrogen fixation. Member Natl. Acad. Sci. USA.
- Stephen Busby (DPhil 1975) FRS, biochemist at the University of Birmingham.
- Carlos Bustamante (b. 1951). Peruvian-American biophysicist at UC Berkeley. Known for single-molecule studies, including the use of optical tweezers for measuring the forces that maintain biological structures. Member Natl. Acad. Sci. USA.

== C ==
=== Ca–Ce ===
- David S. Cafiso (b. 1952). American biochemist at the University of Virginia, with research focusing on membranes and membrane proteins.
- Graham Cairns-Smith FRSE (1931–2016) Scottish organic chemist and molecular biologist at the University of Glasgow.
- John Cairns FRS (1922–2018) was a British physician and molecular biologist at the Harvard School of Public Health.
- T. Colin Campbell (b. 1934). American biochemist at Cornell University, specializing in the effect of nutrition on long-term health.
- David E. Cane (b. 1944). American biological chemist at Brown University, recognized for his work on the biosynthesis of natural products, particularly terpenoids and polyketides.
- Lewis C. Cantley (b. 1949). American cell biologist and biochemist at Harvard Medical School, who has made significant advances to the understanding of cancer metabolism. Member Natl. Acad. Sci. USA.
- Charles Cantor (b. 1942). American biophysicist at Boston University, he developed the method of pulse field gel electrophoresis, and was formerly Director of the Human Genome Project. He is known also for his book series Biophysical Chemistry with Paul Schimmel
- John Carbon (PhD 1955). American cellular biologist at UC Santa Barbara, known for development of techniques for making genome libraries. Member Natl. Acad. Sci. USA.
- María Luz Cárdenas (b. 1944). French biochemist of Chilean origin at the CNRS, Marseille, known for work on mammalian hexokinases.
- H. E. Carter (1910–2007). American biochemist, at the University of Illinois, known for determining the structure of threonine. Member Natl. Acad. Sci. USA.
- Thomas Cech (b. 1947). American biochemist at the University of Colorado, famous for discovering catalytic properties of RNA. Member Natl. Acad. Sci. USA. Nobel prize in chemistry, along with Sidney Altman, in 1989.
- Howard Cedar (b. 1943). Israeli American biochemist at the Hebrew University of Jerusalem, working on DNA methylation, awarded the Israel Prize in Biology in 1999. Member of the Israel Academy of Sciences and Humanities.

=== Ch–Che ===
- Michael Chamberlin (1937–2025). American molecular biologist at UC Berkeley, with research focussed on gene expression in both prokaryotes and eukaryotes. Member Natl. Acad. Sci. USA.
- Britton Chance (1913–2010). American biochemist at the University of Pennsylvania. He studied enzyme structure and function, and invented the stopped-flow spectrophotometer for studying fast reactions. Member Natl. Acad. Sci. USA.
- Christopher Chang (b. 1974). American bioinorganic chemist at UC Berkeley. His research includes molecular imaging sensors for the study of redox biology.
- Jean-Pierre Changeux (b. 1936). French biochemist and neuroscientist at the Collège de France and Institut Pasteur. Originator of the allosteric model of cooperativity, but now known mainly for work in neuroscience.
- Emmett Chappelle (1925–2019). American biochemist at NASA, known for using bioluminescence to develop a method of detecting ATP.
- Erwin Chargaff (1905–2002). Austrian-American biochemist at Columbia, known for Chargaff's rules, according to the first of which the number of guanine units in DNA is equal to the number of cytosine units, and the number of adenine units is equal to the number of thymine units.
- Emmanuelle Charpentier (b. 1968). French microbiologist, geneticist and biochemist. She (with Jennifer Doudna) discovered genome editing with CRISPR. Nobel Prize for Chemistry in 2020. Foreign Associate Natl. Acad. Sci. USA
- Martha Chase (1927–2003). American geneticist at Cold Spring Harbor Laboratory, famous for the Hershey–Chase experiment, which indicated that genetic information is held and transmitted by DNA, not by protein.

=== Che–Cl ===
- Zhijian James Chen (b. 1966). Chinese-American biochemist at the University of Texas Southwestern Medical Center, known discovering mechanisms by which nucleic acids trigger innate and autoimmune responses from the interior of a cell. Member Natl. Acad. Sci. USA.
- Albert Chibnall FRS (1894–1988), British biochemist known for his work on the nitrogen metabolism of plants.
- Ruth Chiquet-Ehrismann (1954–2015), Swiss biochemist and cell biologist working on interactions in the extracellular matrix.
- Cyrus Chothia FRS (1942–2019). British biochemist at Cambridge known for work on protein structure.
- Gilbert Chu (b. 1946). American biochemist at Stanford, known for investigating how cells react to DNA damage from radiation.
- George M. Church (b. 1954). American geneticist at Harvard and MIT, known for pioneering personal genomics and synthetic biology. Member Natl. Acad. Sci. USA.
- Aaron Ciechanover (b. 1947). Israeli biochemist at the Technion, Haifa, known for work on protein turnover. Nobel Prize for Chemistry in 2004. Foreign associate Natl. Acad. Sci. USA.
- Vintilă Ciocâlteu (1890–1947) Roumanian physician, biochemist, researcher, professor, and author.
- Hans Thacher Clarke (1887–1972), British-born American biochemist at Columbia University, known for the Eschweiler–Clarke reaction. Member Natl. Acad. Sci. USA.
- Jane Clarke (b. 1950). Biochemist at Cambridge known for work on folding and assembly of proteins.
- Steven Clarke (b. 1949). American biochemist at UCLA, known for work on molecular damage and molecular repair mechanisms.
- Roy Elwood Clausen (1891–1956). American biochemist, botanist, plant geneticist, and drosophilist
- W. Wallace Cleland (1930–2013). American biochemist at the University of Wisconsin–Madison known for work on enzyme kinetics and mechanism. Member Natl. Acad. Sci. USA.
- G. Marius Clore FRS (b. 1955). British-American biochemist at the NIH known for work in protein and nucleic acid structure determination by nuclear magnetic resonance spectroscopy. Member Natl. Acad. Sci. USA.

=== Co–Coo ===
- Philip Cohen FRS (b. 1945). At the University of Dundee known primarily for work on protein phosphorylation and ubiquitinylation.
- Stanley Cohen (1922–2020). American biochemist at Vanderbilt University. Nobel Prize in Physiology or Medicine (1986).
- Edwin Joseph Cohn (1892–1953). American protein chemist at Harvard, known for studies on blood and the physical chemistry of protein. Author, with John Edsall of Proteins, Amino Acids and Peptides, a very influential book. Member Natl. Acad. Sci. USA.
- Mildred Cohn (1913–2009). American biochemist, at the University of Pennsylvania, pioneer in the use of nuclear magnetic resonance to study enzyme reactions.
- Waldo Cohn (1910–1999). American biochemist at Oak Ridge National Laboratory, known for developing techniques for separating isotopes.
- Linda Columbus (active from 2002). American chemist at the University of Virginia known for work on membrane proteins.
- Sidney Colowick (1916–1985). American biochemist at Vanderbilt University and founding editor of Methods in Enzymology. Member Natl. Acad. Sci. USA.
- Minor J. Coon (1921–2018). American biochemist at the University of Michigan, Ann Arbor, discoverer of 3-hydroxy-3-methylglutaryl-CoA.

=== Cor–Cz ===
- Robert Corey (1897–1971). American protein chemist at Caltech, known for work with Linus Pauling on the α-helix and β-sheet. Member Natl. Acad. Sci. USA.
- Carl Ferdinand Cori (1896–1984). American biochemist at Washington University and Albert Einstein College of Medicine, who worked on glycogen. Nobel Prize in Physiology or Medicine (1947). Member Natl. Acad. Sci. USA.
- Gerty Cori (1896–1957). Czech-American biochemist at Washington University, known for glycogen research. Nobel Prize in Physiology or Medicine (1947).
- Athel Cornish-Bowden (b. 1943). British enzymologist at the CNRS, Marseille. He has contributed to the development of metabolic control analysis, and is the author of Fundamentals of Enzyme Kinetics.
- Suzanne Cory (b. 1942). Australian molecular biologist known fotr work on the genetics of the immune system, at the Walter and Eliza Hall Institute of Medical Research, Melbourne.
- Peter Coveney (b. 1958). British Computational molecular biology specialist at University College London, University of Amsterdam and Yale.
- Nicholas R. Cozzarelli (1938–2006). American biochemist at UC Berkeley, and former editor-in-chief of the Proceedings of the National Academy of Sciences. Member Natl. Acad. Sci. USA.
- Gerald Crabtree (b. 1946). American biochemist at Stanford, known for defining the Ca^{2+}-calcineurin-NFAT signalling pathway, pioneering the development of synthetic ligands for regulation of biological processes.
- Robert K. Crane (1919–2010). American biochemist at the University of Medicine and Dentistry of New Jersey, known for his discovery of sodium-glucose cotransport.
- Francis Crick FRS (1916–2004). British molecular biologist and neuroscientist at the University of Cambridge and the Salk Institute, noted for proposing the double helical structure of DNA. Foreign associate Natl. Acad. Sci. USA.
- Pedro Cuatrecasas (1936–2025). American biochemist at UC San Diego, known for the development of affinity chromatography. Member Natl. Acad. Sci. USA.
- Richard D. Cummings (20th–21st century). American biologist at Harvard, known for studying pathways of glycoconjugate biosynthesis and alterations in biosynthesis in human and animal diseases.
- Anthony Czarnik (b. 1957). American chemist and inventor known for pioneering studies in the field of fluorescent chemosensors.

== D ==
=== Da ===
- Valerie Daggett (BS 1993). American protein chemist at the University of Washington, known for molecular dynamics simulations of proteins and other biomolecules.
- John Call Dalton (1825–1889). American physiologist at the New York Metropolitan Board of Health, known for detailed and precise sketches of the brain.
- John W. Daly (1933–2008). American biochemist at the NIH, working primarily on alkaloids. Member Natl. Acad. Sci. USA.
- Marie Maynard Daly (1921–2003). American biochemist at the Albert Einstein College of Medicine, who studied the chemistry of histones, protein synthesis, the relationships between cholesterol and hypertension, and uptake of creatine by muscle cells.
- Keith Dalziel FRS (1921–1994). British biochemist at Oxford University, pioneer in analysis of the kinetics of two-substrate enzyme-catalysed reactions.
- Carl Peter Henrik Dam (1895–1976). Danish biochemist and physiologist at Copenhagen University who discovered vitamin K and its role in human physiology. Nobel Prize in Physiology or Medicine (1943).
- Marguerite Davis (1887–1967). American biochemist at the University of Wisconsin, co-discoverer of vitamins A and B
- Ronald W. Davis (b. 1941). American biochemist and geneticist at Stanford, known for developing new technologies in genomics. Member Natl. Acad. Sci. USA.
- Jean Dausset (1916–2009). French immunologist at INSERM who worked on the major histocompatibility complex. Nobel Prize in Physiology and Medicine (1980). Member Natl. Acad. Sci. USA. Member of the French Academy of Science
- Margaret Oakley Dayhoff (1925–1983). American biochemist at Georgetown University, pioneer in bioinformatics.

=== De–Di ===
- Christian de Duve FRS (foreign associate) (1917–2013). Belgian cytologist and biochemist at the Université Catholique de Louvain, known for discovering peroxisomes and lysosomes. Nobel Prize for Physiology or Medicine (1974). Foreign Associate Natl. Acad. Sci. USA.
- Michael W. Deem (PhD 1994). American biochemist and genetic engineer at Rice University, known for work in evolution, immunology, and materials.
- William DeGrado (b. 1955). American pharmaceutical chemist at UC San Francisco, known for protein design, synthesis of peptidomimetics, and characterizing membrane-active peptides and proteins. Member Natl. Acad. Sci. USA.
- Max Delbrück FRS (1906–1981). German-American biophysicist at Caltech. Nobel Prize in Physiology or Medicine (1969). Member Natl. Acad. Sci. USA.
- Hector DeLuca (b. 1930). American biochemist at the University of Wisconsin, known for work on vitamin D. Member Natl. Acad. Sci. USA.
- Pierre De Meyts (1944–2025). Belgian physician and biochemist at the Université Catholique de Louvain, known for studies of hormone-receptor interaction of peptide hormones and the physiopathogenesis of diabetes.
- Willey Glover Denis (1879–1929). American biochemist at Tulane University, a pioneer in clinical chemistry and the measurement of protein in biological fluids.
- Rosa Devés (born 1950), Chilean biochemist, first woman rector of the University of Chile.
- Richard E. Dickerson (1931–2025), American biochemist, the first to carry out a single-crystal structure analysis of B-DNA.
- Zacharias Dische (1895–1988). American biochemist of Ukrainian-Jewish origin, who discovered metabolic regulation by feedback inhibition.
- Henry Berkeley Franks (Hal) Dixon (1928–2008). British enzymologist at the University of Cambridge.
- Malcolm Dixon FRS (1899–1985). British biochemist at the University of Cambridge. Research on enzyme structure, kinetics, and properties. His book (with Edwin C. Webb) Enzymes was very influential.

=== Do–Du ===
- George H. Dodd (c. 1942–2020). British biochemist who studied perfumes and pheromones.
- Edward Adelbert Doisy (1893–1986). American biochemist at St Louis University, known for discovering vitamin K. Nobel Prize in Physiology or Medicine (1943).
- Ford Doolittle (b. 1942). American biochemist at Dalhousie University, known for contributions to the study of cyanobacteria and of biochemical evolution in general. Member Natl. Acad. Sci. USA.
- Jonathan Dordick (b. 1959). American biochemical engineer at Rensselaer Polytechnic Institute, known for development of enzyme catalysis under extreme conditions.
- Ralph Dorfman (1911–1985). American biochemist at Stanford, known for treatments for cancer and rheumatoid arthritis
- Jennifer Doudna (b. 1964). American biochemist at UC Berkeley, known for CRISPR-mediated genome editing. Member Natl. Acad. Sci. USA. Nobel Prize in Chemistry, 2020.
- Alexander Dounce (1909–1997). American protein chemist at the University of Rochester, active in early work on the genetic code, one of the first to suggest that it was triplet-based.
- Gideon Dreyfuss (PhD 1978). American biochemist and biophysicist at the University of Pennsylvania, concerned with the function and biogenesis of non-coding RNA and the proteins that interact with RNA. Member Natl. Acad. Sci. USA.
- Jack Cecil Drummond FRS (1891–1952). British biochemist at University College London, known for the isolation of Vitamin A, and wartime advisor on nutrition. Murdered in France, with his wife and daughter.
- Vincent du Vigneaud (1901–1978). American biochemist known for work on oxytocin. Nobel Prize in Chemistry.

== E ==
- Setsuro Ebashi (1922–2006). Japanese biochemist at the University of Tokyo who discovered troponin.
- Richard H. Ebright (b. 1959). American molecular biologist at Rutgers University, known for work on protein-DNA interaction, aspects of transcription, and antibacterial drug discovery.
- John Tileston Edsall (1902–2002). American protein chemist at Harvard, very influential in protein research, and author (with Edwin Cohn) of Proteins, Amino Acids and Peptides. Member Natl. Acad. Sci. USA.
- Konstantin Efetov (b. 1958). Ukrainian biochemist at Crimea State Medical University, known for work in molecular immunology, evolutionary biology, and biosystematics.
- Gertrude B. Elion (1918–1999). American biochemist and pharmacologist at Duke University, known for using rational drug design for the discovery of new drugs. Nobel Prize in Physiology or Medicine (1988).
- Conrad Elvehjem (1901–1962). American biochemist and nutritionist at the University of Wisconsin, known for identifying two vitamins, nicotinic acid, and nicotinamide.
- Gladys Anderson Emerson (1903–1984). American historian, biochemist and nutritionist at UCLA, the first to isolate Vitamin E in a pure form.
- Akira Endo (1933–2024). Japanese biochemist at the Tokyo University of Agriculture and Technology. His research into the relationship between fungi and cholesterol biosynthesis led to the development of statin drugs. Foreign associate Natl. Acad. Sci. USA.
- Donald Engelman (b. 1941). American biochemist at Yale, involved in the creation of new cancer drugs and treatments. Member Natl. Acad. Sci. USA
- Lars Ernster (1920–1998; original name Ernster László). Swedish biochemist at Stockholm, of Hungarian origin. Member of the Board of the Nobel Foundation (1977–1988). Known for work on mitochondria and energy transduction. Member of the Royal Swedish Academy of Sciences.
- Earl Evans (1910–1999). American biochemist at the University of Chicago known for developing techniques in radiobiology and other fields.

== F ==
=== Fa–Fi ===
- Leone N. Farrell (1904–1986). Canadian biochemist and microbiologist at Connaught Laboratories (Toronto) who discovered a way to isolate live virus in bulk quantities, sufficient for producing the polio vaccine.
- Richard D. Feinman (b. 1940). American biochemist and medical researcher at SUNY Downstate Medical Center, known for research on the Atkins Diet, and on application of thermodynamics to nutrition.
- David Sidney Feingold (1922–2019). American biochemist at the University of Pittsburgh known for research on carbohydrates.
- David Fell (b. 1947). British biochemist at Oxford Brookes University who has contributed to the development of systems biology. Author of Understanding the control of metabolism.
- John D. Ferry (1912–2002). Canadian-American biochemist at the University of Wisconsin–Madison noted for development of surgical products from blood plasma. Member Natl. Acad. Sci. USA.
- Alan Fersht FRS (b. 1943). British chemist and biochemist at the University of Cambridge, known for enzyme kinetics and protein folding. Foreign Associate Natl. Acad. Sci. USA.
- Edmond H. Fischer FRS (foreign member) (1920–2021). Swiss American biochemist at the University of Washington known for protein kinases and phosphatases. Nobel Prize in Physiology or Medicine (1992). Member Natl. Acad. Sci. USA.

=== Fl–Fu ===
- Louis B. Flexner (1902–1996). American biochemist at the University of Pennsylvania, who worked on the biochemistry of memory and brain function. Member Natl. Acad. Sci. USA.
- Otto Folin (1867–1934). Swedish-American chemist at Harvard, best known for developing methods for the determination of the constituents of protein-free blood filtrates. Member Natl. Acad. Sci. USA.
- Karl August Folkers (1906–1997). American biochemist at Merck, known for work on the antibiotics cathomycin and cycloserine.
- Ivar Asbjørn Følling (1888–1973). Norwegian biochemist and geneticist who first described phenylketonuria.
- Sidney W. Fox (1912–1998). American biochemist at the University of Miami who worked on the production of amino acids in abiotic conditions.
- Heinz Fraenkel-Conrat (1910–1999). German-American biochemist at UC Berkeley, known for research on viruses such as tobacco mosaic virus. Member Natl. Acad. Sci. USA.
- Rosalind Franklin (1920–1958). British X-ray crystallographer at King's and Birkbeck Colleges, London, who worked on the structure of DNA
- Perry A. Frey (b. 1935). American biochemist at the University of Wisconsin known for work on enzyme mechanisms. Member Natl. Acad. Sci. USA.
- Irwin Fridovich (1929–2019). American biochemist at Duke University, who discovered superoxide dismutase and studied its mechanisms and superoxide toxicity. Member Natl. Acad. Sci. USA.
- Joseph S. Fruton (1912–2007). Polish-American biochemist at the Rockefeller Institute. He worked on proteases, but is best known for his influential book General Biochemistry, written with his wife Sofia Simmonds, and for later work on the history of biochemistry. Member Natl. Acad. Sci. USA.
- Kazimierz Funk (1884–1967). Polish-American biochemist at the Pasteur Institute, discoverer of vitamin B_{3} (niacin).
- Robert F. Furchgott (1916–2009). American biochemist at the State University of New York known for discovering the biological roles of nitric oxide. Nobel Prize in Physiology or Medicine (1998). Member Natl. Acad. Sci. USA.

== G ==
=== Ga–Go ===
- Elmer L. Gaden (1923–2012). American biochemical engineer at the University of Virginia, known as the father of biochemical engineering.
- Michael H. Gelb (b. 1957). American biochemist at the University of Washington who studies study enzymatic processes of biomedical significance.
- Susan Gerbi, (b. 1944). American biochemist at Brown University working on RNA and DNA.
- Jonathan Gershenzon (b. 1955). American biochemist at the Max Planck Institute for Chemical Ecology in Jena, known for work on the biochemistry of secondary plant metabolites.
- Quentin Gibson FRS (1918–2011). British-American biochemist at Sheffield and later Cornell University who worked on haem proteins. Member Natl. Acad. Sci. USA.
- Walter Gilbert FRS (foreign member) (b. 1932). American biochemist at Harvard, awarded the Nobel Prize in Chemistry (1980) for work on DNA sequencing. Member Natl. Acad. Sci. USA.
- H. Bentley Glass (1906–2005). American biochemist at the State University of New York at Stony Brook. Member Natl. Acad. Sci. USA
- Joseph L. Goldstein (b. 1940). American biochemist at the University of Texas, awarded the Nobel Prize in Physiology or Medicine (1985) for studies of cholesterol. Member Natl. Acad. Sci. USA.
- Eugene Goldwasser (1922–2010). American biochemist at the University of Chicago, known for identifying the hormone erythropoietin.
- Michael M. Gottesman (b. 1946). American biochemist at the NIH, whose achievements includes the discovery of P-glycoprotein. Member Natl. Acad. Sci. USA.
- Alfred Gottschalk (1894–1973). German-British biochemist, known for glycoprotein research and the discovery of viral neuraminidase.

=== Gr–Gu ===
- Sam Granick (1909–1977). American biochemist at the Rockefeller University, known for his studies of ferritin and iron metabolism. Member Natl. Acad. Sci. USA.
- David E. Green (1910–1983). American biochemist at the University of Wisconsin, pioneer in the study of enzymes involved in oxidative phosphorylation. Member Natl. Acad. Sci. USA.
- Rowena Green Matthews (b. 1938). American biochemist at the University of Michigan Ann Arbor, working on the role of organic cofactors of enzymes, especially folic acid and cobalamin. Member Natl. Acad. Sci. USA.
- Lewis Joel Greene (b. 1934), American-Brazilian biochemist at the University of São Paulo, known for studies of protein chemistry.
- François Gros (1925–2022). French biologist and pioneer of cellular biochemistry at the French Academy of Sciences.
- Kun-Liang Guan (b. 1963). Chinese-American biochemist at the University of Michigan who works on gene regulation.
- F. Peter Guengerich (b. 1949). Biochemist and toxicologist at Vanderbilt University, working on cytochromes P450, DNA damage and carcinogenesis, and drug metabolism. Note. His personal Wikipedia page is very uninformative.
- Joan Guinovart (1947–2025). Spanish biochemist at the Institute for Research in Biomedicine (IRB Barcelona) known for studies of glycogen.
- Irwin Gunsalus (1912–2008). American biochemist at the University of Illinois, who discovered lipoic acid. He coauthored The Bacteria: A Treatise on Structure and Function with Roger Y. Stanier, a highly influential five-volume work. Member Natl. Acad. Sci. USA.
- Herbert Gutfreund FRS (1921–2021). Austrian-British biochemist at Bristol, known for enzyme kinetics and for developing methods for studying fast reactions.

== H ==
=== Ha–He ===
- James Haber (b. 1943). American molecular biologist at Brandeis University known for his discoveries in the field of DNA repair. Member Natl. Acad. Sci. USA.
- J. B. S. Haldane (John Burdon Sanderson Haldane, 1892–1964). British (and later Indian) geneticist, biochemist (study of enzymes) and statistician, at University College London and at the end of his life at the Indian Statistical Institute. Apart from his contributions to science, he was notable for political activism and wrote many articles for the Daily Worker.
- Gordon Hammes (b. 1934). American biochemist at Cornell and Duke University, noted for work on enzyme mechanisms and kinetics. Member Natl. Acad. Sci. USA.
- Philip Handler (1917–1981). American nutritionist and biochemist, noted for the understanding of nicotinic acid deficiency and the discovery of the tryptophan-nicotinic acid relationship. He was at Duke University until he became President of the Natl. Acad. Sci. USA
- Jean Hanson (1919–1973). British biophysicist and zoologist at Massachusetts Institute of Technology known for her contributions to muscle research.
- Arthur Harden FRS (1865–1940). British biochemist at the Lister Institute, known for work on the fermentation of sugar and fermentative enzymes. Nobel Prize in Chemistry (1929).
- Grahame Hardie FRS (b. 1950), British biochemist at the University of Dundee, known for work on AMP-activated protein kinase.
- Harry Harris FRS, FCRP (1919–1994), British-born biochemist who showed that human genetic variation was not rare.
- Edwin B. Hart (1874–1953), American biochemist at the University of Wisconsin-Madison who studied farm animal diet.
- Brian S. Hartley FRS (1926–2021). British biochemist at Imperial College London. Known for studies on chymotrypsin and other proteolytic enzymes.
- Hamilton Hartridge FRS (1886–1976). British eye physiologist known in biochemistry for the continuous-flow method for following fast reactions.
- Demis Hassabis (b. 1976). British computer scientist and artificial intelligence researcher at University College London. Nobel Prize in chemistry 2024.
- Reinhart Heinrich (1946–2006). German biophysicist at the Humboldt University of Berlin, noted for the origin and development of metabolic control analysis.
- Max Henius (1859–1935). Danish-American biochemist who specialized in fermentation processes. Founder of the Chicago-based American Brewing Academy.
- Victor Henri (1872–1940). French physical chemist of Russian parents at the University of Liège. He was the first to apply ideas of physical chemistry to the properties of enzymes.
- Avram Hershko (b. 1937 as Herskó Ferenc). Hungarian-Israeli biochemist at the Technion (Haifa), known for the discovery of ubiquitin-mediated protein degradation. Nobel Prize in Chemistry (2004). Foreign associate Natl. Acad. Sci. USA.

=== Hi–Hu ===
- Evelyn Hickmans] (1883–1972). British biochemist, pioneer in treatment of phenylketonuria
- Archibald Vivian Hill FRS (1886–1977). British protein biophysicist at University College London known primarily for work in muscle biochemistry, but also for the Hill equation, still widely used for quantifying protein cooperativity. Nobel Prize in Physiology or Medicine (1922).
- Robin Hill FRS (1899–1991). British plant biochemist at the University of Cambridge who demonstrated the Hill reaction of photosynthesis.
- Frank Hird (1920–2014). Australian agricultural biochemist at the University of Melbourne.
- Dorothy Hodgkin FRS (1910–1994). British X-ray crystallographer at the University of Oxford, pioneer in protein crystallography. Nobel Prize in Chemistry (1964)
- Jan-Hendrik S. Hofmeyr (b. 1953). South African biochemist at the University of Stellenbosch active in metabolic control analysis.
- Kenneth Charles Holmes FRS (1934–2021), British molecular biologist and a pioneer in using synchrotron X-ray radiation
- Mei Hong (born 1970). Chinese-American biophysical chemist known for development solid-state nuclear magnetic resonance to elucidate the structures and mechanisms of membrane proteins
- Nick Hoogenraad (active from 1969). Australian biochemist, discoverer of the mechanism of the mitochondrial unfolded protein response, Professor of Biochemistry at La Trobe University (1993–2014).
- Frederick Gowland Hopkins FRS (President) (1861–1947). British biochemist at Cambridge University who discovered tryptophan and worked on vitamins. Nobel Prize in Physiology or Medicine (1929)
- Bernard Horecker (1914–2010). American biochemist at Cornell University known for elucidation of the pentose phosphate pathway. Member Natl. Acad. Sci. USA.
- Linda Hsieh-Wilson (PhD 1996). American chemist known for work in chemical neurobiology and the structure and function of carbohydrates in the nervous system
- Wayne L. Hubbell (b. 1943). American biochemist at UCLA, pioneer of site-directed spin labelling. Member Natl. Acad. Sci. USA.
- Hugh Huxley (1924–2013). British molecular biologist at University College London and Brandeis University noted for discovery the underlying principle of muscle movement.

== I ==
- Harvey Itano (1920–2010). American biochemist at UC San Diego, best known for work on the molecular basis of sickle cell anaemia. Member Natl. Acad. Sci. USA.

== J ==
- Sophie E. Jackson (active from 1991). Biochemist at the University of Cambridge known for work on protein folding.
- Alec Jeffreys FRS (b. 1950). British biochemist and geneticist at Leicester University, known for inventing genetic fingerprinting.
- William Jencks FRS (foreign member) (1927–2007). American biochemist at Brandeis University, known for applying chemical mechanisms to enzyme-catalysed reactions and for his masterly book Catalysis in Chemistry and Enzymology. Member Natl. Acad. Sci. USA.
- Thomas H. Jukes (1906–1999). British-American biologist at UC Berkeley known for work in nutrition and molecular evolution. He was very active in denouncing pseudoscience.
- John Michael Jumper (b. 1985). American chemist and computer scientist at DeepMind Technologies. Nobel Prize in chemistry, 2024.

== K ==
=== Ka–Ke ===
- Henrik Kacser FRSE (1918–1995). British geneticist and biochemist at Edinburgh, founder of metabolic control analysis.
- Emil T. Kaiser (1938–1988). Hungarian-born American protein chemist at the University of Chicago, known for his work on enzyme modification. Member Natl. Acad. Sci. USA.
- Herman Kalckar (1908–1991). Danish biochemist at the New York Public Health Research Institute, who worked on cellular respiration, nucleotide metabolism and galactose metabolism. Member Natl. Acad. Sci. USA
- Nathan O. Kaplan (1917–1986) Enzymologist at UC San Diego, founding editor of Methods in Enzymology. Member Natl. Acad. Sci. USA
- Sir Bernard Katz FRS (1911–2003). German-British neuroscientist and biophysicist at University College London. Nobel Prize in Physiology or Medicine (1970) for work on nerve biochemistry and the pineal gland.
- Stuart Alan Kauffman (b. 1939). American theoretical biologist, expert on complex systems, now at the University of Pennsylvania. Fellow of the Royal Society of Canada.
- Douglas Kell (b. 1953). British biochemist at the University of Manchester, known for research on functional genomics, metabolomics and the yeast genome.
- John Kendrew FRS (1917–1997). British x-ray crystallographer at the European Molecular Biology Laboratory, Heidelberg, known for determining the crystal structure of myoglobin. Nobel Prize in Chemistry (1962).
- Sir Ernest Kennaway FRS (1881–1958), British pathologist at the Institute of Cancer Research, London, who carried out early work on carcinogenic effects of hydrocarbons.
- Eugene P. Kennedy (1919–2011), American biochemist at the Harvard Medical School known for work on lipid metabolism and membrane function.
- Dorothee Kern (born 1966), Biochemist at Brandeis University known for work on the motion of proteins using genomic data.

=== Kh-Kn ===
- Har Gobind Khorana (1922–2011). Indian-American biochemist at the University of Wisconsin, who participated in elucidating the genetic code. Nobel Prize for Physiology or Medicine (1968). Member Natl. Acad. Sci. USA.
- Ann Kimble-Hill (21st century). American biochemist studying structure-function relationships of membrane proteins and lipids
- Charles Glen King (1896–1988). American biochemist at the University of Pittsburgh. He isolated vitamin C, and was a pioneer in the field of nutrition research.
- Judith Klinman (b. 1941). American chemist, biochemist, and molecular biologist at UC Berkeley, known for her work on enzyme catalysis. Member Natl. Acad. Sci. USA.
- Aaron Klug FRS (President) (1926–2018). Lithuanian/South African/British structural biologist at Cambridge University. Nobel Prize in Chemistry (1982). Foreign associate Natl. Acad. Sci. USA.
- Franz Knoop (1875–1946). German biochemist at the University of Tübingen known for the discovery of β-oxidation.
- Jeremy Randall Knowles FRS (1935–2008). British and American biochemist at Oxford and Harvard, known for research on enzyme mechanisms. Foreign Associate Natl. Acad. Sci. USA.

=== Ko–Ku ===
- Arthur Kornberg (1918–2007). American biochemist at Stanford, who won the Nobel Prize in Chemistry (1959) for discovery of DNA polymerase. Member Natl. Acad. Sci. USA.
- Sir Hans Kornberg FRS (1928–2019). British biochemist at Cambridge University, known for research in microbial biochemistry. Member Natl. Acad. Sci. USA.
- Roger D. Kornberg (b. 1947). American biochemist at Stanford, who won the Nobel Prize in Chemistry (2006) for studies on RNA polymerase. Member Natl. Acad. Sci. USA.
- Sylvy Kornberg (1917–1986). American biochemist at Stanford, who worked in collaboration with Arthur Kornberg on DNA replication and polyphosphate synthesis.
- Thomas B. Kornberg (b. 1948). American biochemist at UC San Francisco, who works on Drosophila melanogaster development.
- Daniel E. Koshland Jr. (1920–2007). American biochemist at UC Berkeley, known for protein flexibility (induced fit). Member Natl. Acad. Sci. USA
- Douglas Koshland (b. 1953). Molecular and cellular biologist at UC Berkeley.
- Edwin Gerhard Krebs (1918–2009) was an American biochemist at the University of Washington, Seattle, and Nobel prizewinner, known for the study of phosphorylation/hydrolysis cycling.
- Sir Hans Adolf Krebs FRS (1900–1981). British biochemist at Sheffield and Oxford, known for many advances in metabolism, most notably the tricarboxylate ("Krebs") cycle. Nobel Prize in Physiology or Medicine (1953).
- Charles Kurland (b. 1936) Member of the Royal Swedish Academy of Sciences. Swedish biochemist at Lund University, of American origin, known for work on the tree of life.

== L ==
=== La–Lem ===
- Marc Lacroix (b. 1963). Belgian biochemist at the Institut Jules Bordet (Brussels), who specializes in breast cancer biology, metastasis and therapy.
- Keith Laidler (1916–2003). British-Canadian chemist and biochemist at the University of Ottawa. Expert on chemical and enzyme kinetics. Fellow of the Royal Society of Canada.
- Henry Lardy (1917–2010). American biochemist at the University of Wisconsin, noted for work on metabolism. Member Natl. Acad. Sci. USA.
- Michel Lazdunski (b. 1938). French biochemist and neuroscientist at Sophia Antipolis. Known especially for work on ion channels. Full Member of the French Academy of Sciences.
- Jack Legge (1917–1996). Australian biochemist known for his work on blood pigment metabolism and participation in mustard gas trials on Australian Defence Force volunteers during WW2.
- Albert L. Lehninger (1917–1986). American biochemist at the University of Wisconsin. He discovered, with Eugene P. Kennedy, that mitochondria are the site of oxidative phosphorylation in eukaryotes. Author of several influential texts, including The Mitochondrion, Bioenergetics and Biochemistry. Member Natl. Acad. Sci. USA.
- Luis Federico Leloir FRS (foreign associate) (1906–1987). Argentinian biochemist at the Fundación Instituto Campomar (Buenos Aires) who worked on sugar nucleotides, carbohydrate metabolism, and renal hypertension. Nobel Prize for Chemistry (1970).
- Rudi Lemberg FRS (1896–1975). German-Australian biochemist, director of the Kolling Institute of Medical Research from 1935 to 1972. Known for porphyrin research.

=== Lev–Ly ===
- Phoebus Levene (1869–1940). Russian-American biochemist at the Rockefeller Institute, who discovered that DNA was composed of nucleobases and phosphate. Member Natl. Acad. Sci. USA.
- Cyrus Levinthal (1922–1990). American molecular biologist at Columbia, known for theoretical analysis of protein folding, and for Levinthal's paradox.
- Alexander Levitzki (b. 1940). Israeli biochemist at the Hebrew University of Jerusalem, known for developing specific chemical inhibitors of cancer-induced protein kinases. Member of the Israel Academy of Sciences and Humanities.
- Michael Levitt FRS (b. 1947). American-British-Israeli-South African biophysicist at Stanford. Nobel Prize in Chemistry (2013). Member Natl. Acad. Sci. USA.
- Choh Hao Li (1913–1987). Chinese-American biochemist at UC Berkeley. Known for discovering and synthesizing the human pituitary growth hormone. Academician of the Chinese Academy of Sciences (Academia Sinica). Member Natl. Acad. Sci. USA.
- Justus von Liebig (1803–1873). German scientist at the University of Giessen who made major contributions to agricultural and biological chemistry; one of the founders of organic chemistry.
- Hans Lineweaver (1907–2009). American physical chemist at the U.S. Department of Agriculture, known mainly for popularizing the double-reciprocal plot.
- Anthony William Linnane FRS (1930–2017). Australian biochemist at Monash University, known for work on mitochondria, and in particular for the relationship between mitochondrial damage and aging. Fellow of the Australian Academy of Science.
- Fritz Lipmann (1899–1986). German and later American biochemist at the Rockefeller University, known for work in intermediary metabolism. Nobel Prize in Physiology or Medicine (1953). Member Natl. Acad. Sci. USA.
- William Lipscomb Jr. (1919–2011). American inorganic and organic chemist at Harvard, who worked on nuclear magnetic resonance, theoretical chemistry, boron chemistry, and biochemistry. Nobel Prize in Chemistry (1976). Member Natl. Acad. Sci. USA.
- André Michel Lwoff FRS (foreign associate) (1902–1994). French microbiologist at the Institut Pasteur. Nobel Prize in Medicine (1965). Member Natl. Acad. Sci. USA.
- Feodor Felix Konrad Lynen FRS (1911–1979). German biochemist at the Max-Planck Institute for Cellular Chemistry (Munich), who worked on the mechanism and regulation of cholesterol and fatty acid metabolism. Nobel Prize in Physiology or Medicine (1964). Foreign associate Natl. Acad. Sci. USA.

== M ==
=== M–Mey ===
- Ida Maclean (1877–1944). British biochemist at the Lister Institute of Preventive Medicine, known work on fatty acids in animals and fat synthesis.
- John Macleod FRS (1876–1935). British biochemist and physiologist at the University of Toronto, discoverer of insulin. Nobel Prize in Physiology or Medicine (1923).
- Thaddeus Mann FRS (1908–1993). Ukrainian-British biochemist at the University of Cambridge, who worked on reproductive biology.
- Bengt Mannervik (b. 1943). Swedish biochemist at Stockholm University known for work on enzymes related to glutathione metabolism.
- Emanuel Margoliash (1920–2008). Israeli-American biochemist at Northwestern University, known for research on cytochrome c sequences, which formed the starting point for studies of protein evolution. Member Natl. Acad. Sci. USA.
- Vincent Massey FRS (1926–2002). Australian biochemist and enzymologist at the University of Michigan, best known for studies of flavoenzymes. Member Natl. Acad. Sci. USA.
- Elmer Verner McCollum (1879–1967). American biochemist at Johns Hopkins University, who discovered Vitamins A and D, and their benefits. Member Natl. Acad. Sci. USA.
- Harden M. McConnell (1927–2014). American biochemist at Stanford known for the technique of spin-labels, whereby electron and nuclear magnetic resonance can be used to study the structure and kinetics of proteins. Member Natl. Acad. Sci. USA.
- William D. McElroy (1917–1999). American biochemist and science administrator at University of California San Diego. Member Natl. Acad. Sci. USA.
- Enrique Meléndez-Hevia (born 1946). Spanish biochemist at the University of La Laguna, known for studies of evolution and metabolism.
- Maud Menten (1879–1960). Canadian biochemist at the University of Pittsburgh who carried out early work on enzyme kinetics. Later she pioneered the use of electrophoresis to study haemoglobin variants.
- Otto Fritz Meyerhof FRS (foreign member) (1884–1951). German-American physician and biochemist at the University of Pennsylvania, who pioneered the study of muscle biochemistry. Nobel Prize in Physiology or Medicine (1922).

=== Mic–Mu ===
- Leonor Michaelis (1875–1949). German biochemist at the Rockefeller Institute of Medical Research, known for early work on enzyme kinetics. He developed biochemistry in Japan. He studied quinones, and used this knowledge to develop a method for producing a perm (hairstyle).
- Friedrich Miescher (1844–1895). Swiss physician and biologist at Leipzig University, the first to isolate DNA.
- Kenneth R. Miller (born 1948), American evolutionary biologist and author of Finding Darwin's God
- César Milstein FRS (1927–2002). Argentinian-British biochemist at the University of Cambridge, known for developing the use of monoclonal antibodies. Nobel Prize in Physiology or Medicine (1984). Foreign associate Natl. Acad. Sci. USA.
- María Teresa Miras Portugal (1948–2021), Spanish biochemist, pharmacist and molecular biologist.
- Peter D. Mitchell FRS (1920–1992). British biochemist at Glynn Research, known for the theory of chemiosmosis. Nobel Prize in Chemistry (1978). Foreign associate Natl. Acad. Sci. USA.
- John Keith Moffat (b. 1943), British biophysicist at Argonne National Laboratory known for work on time-resolved crystallography.
- Catherine Anne Money (b. 1940), Australian biochemist known for revolutionizing leather production
- Jacques Monod FRS (foreign member) (1910–1976). French biochemist and microbiologist at the Pasteur Institute, known for many discoveries and for the theory of allostery. His philosophical book Chance and Necessity has been influential. Nobel Prize in Physiology or Medicine (1965).
- Jennifer Moyle (1921-2016), British biochemist involved in the development of the chemiosmosic theory
- Kary Mullis (1944–2019). American biochemist at the Cetus Corporation (Emeryville, California), inventor of the polymerase chain reaction. Nobel Prize in Chemistry (1993).

== N ==
- David Nachmansohn (1899–1983). German biochemist at Columbia, responsible for elucidating the role of phosphocreatine in energy production in muscles. Member Natl. Acad. Sci. USA
- Joseph Needham FRS (1900–1995). British biochemist at Cambridge, historian and sinologist, noted for embryology and morphogenesis, and also in Chinese science.
- Eva J. Neer (1937–2000). American physician and biochemist at Harvard, who researched on G-protein cell biology. Member of the National Academy of Medicine.
- Joe Neilands (1921–2008). Canadian-born American biochemist and political activist at UC Berkeley, known for studies of microbial iron transport, and as author, with Paul K. Stumpf of Outlines of Enzyme Chemistry.
- Carl Neuberg (1877–1956). German biochemist at the University of Berlin, a pioneer in the study of metabolism.
- Michael Neuberger (1953–2013). British biochemist and immunologist at Cambridge University known for delineating the role of DNA deamination in immunity.
- Hans Neurath (1909–2002). American protein chemist at the University of Washington. He was the Founding editor of Biochemistry, which he edited for 30 years (1961–1991). Member Natl. Acad. Sci. USA.
- Eric Newsholme (1935–2011). British biochemist at the University of Oxford who specialised in human metabolism.
- Hermann Niemeyer (1918–1991). Chilean biochemist. National Prize of Science (Chile). Member of the Academy of Science of Chile.
- Marshall Warren Nirenberg (1927–2010). American biochemist and geneticist at the NIH, who showed that UUU codes for phenylalanine, the first step in deciphering the genetic code. Nobel Prize in Physiology or Medicine (1968). Member Natl. Acad. Sci. USA.
- Roland Victor Norris (1888–1950). British biochemist at the Indian Institute of Science, who worked on glycogen metabolism and yeast fermentation, and later pioneered biochemistry in India.
- Paul Nurse FRS (President) (b. 1949). British geneticist at the Rockefeller University, who worked on control of the cell cycle. Nobel Prize in Physiology or Medicine (2001)

== O ==
- Severo Ochoa (1905–1993). Spanish and American biochemist at New York University, major contributor to elucidating the genetic code. Nobel Prize in Physiology or Medicine (1959). Member Natl. Acad. Sci. USA.
- Alexander George Ogston FRS (1911–1996). British biochemist at Oxford University, known for the three-point attachment explanation of how an achiral substance can have a chiral product in the tricarboxylate cycle.
- Reiji Okazaki (1930–1975). Japanese molecular biologist at Nagoya University, known for discovering Okazaki fragments, an essential step for understanding DNA replication.
- Tsuneko Okazaki (b. 1933). Japanese molecular biologist at Nagoya University, known for discovering Okazaki fragments, an essential step for understanding DNA replication. L'Oréal-UNESCO Award for Women in Science.
- Joan Oró (1923–2004). Spanish biochemist at the University of Houston. Prominent for studies of the origin of life.
- Muriel Wheldale Onslow (1880–1932). British biochemist at Cambridge University, pioneer in biochemical genetics who worked on petal colour in flowers.
- Alexander Oparin, (1894–1980). Soviet biochemist at Moscow State University, known for his theory on the origin of life in coacervates. Full Member of the USSR Academy of Sciences.
- Mary Osborn (b. 1940). English cell biologist at the University of Göttingen known for developing techniques for determining protein molecular masses.
- Mary Jane Osborn (1927–2019). American biochemist at the University of Connecticut, who worked on lipopolysaccharides, and discovered the mechanism of action of methotrexate. Member Natl. Acad. Sci. USA.
- Yuri Ovchinnikov (1934–1988). Soviet biochemist at Moscow State University and the Protein Institute of the Academy of Sciences of the Soviet Union known for research on rhodopsin and structural biology. Full member of the Academy of Sciences of the Soviet Union.

== P ==
- Pier Paolo Pandolfi (b. 1963). Italian geneticist and molecular biologist at the Desert Research Institute, Reno, known for work on pseudogenes.
- Jakub Karol Parnas (1884–1949). Polish-Soviet biochemist at the University of Lviv, who discovered (with Gustav Embden and Otto Fritz Meyerhof), the glycolytic pathway.
- Linus Pauling (1901–1994). American chemist and biochemist at Caltech, known for many advances in chemistry, including the α-helical structure of proteins. Nobel Prize in Chemistry (1954).
- Louis Pasteur FRS (foreign associate) (1822–1895). French biologist, microbiologist and chemist at the Pasteur Institute (Paris), who made many contributions to microbiology, stereochemistry and medicine, including the first vaccines for rabies and anthrax. Natl. Acad. Sci. USA (foreign associate).
- Arthur Peacocke (1924–2006). British Anglican theologian and biochemist at the University of Oxford.
- Max Perutz FRS (1914–2002). Austrian-British molecular biologist and X-ray crystallographer at Cambridge University, who solved the crystal structure of haemoglobin. Nobel Prize in Chemistry (1962).
- Samuel Victor Perry FRS (1918–2009). British biochemist at the University of Birmingham, pioneer in the biochemistry of muscle.
- Gösta Pettersson (b. 1937). Swedish biochemist at the University of Lund, expert on enzyme kinetics.
- Antoinette Pirie (1905–1991), British biochemist, ophthalmologist, and educator.
- Norman Wingate Pirie FRS (1907–1997), British biochemist and virologist.
- Rosalind Pitt-Rivers (1907–1990). British biochemist at the National Institute for Medical Research in Mill Hill, London, specializing in thyroid biochemistry.
- David Andrew Phoenix (b. 1966). British biochemist at London South Bank University, where he studies properties of biologically active amphiphilic peptides.
- Rodney Porter FRS (1917–1985). British biochemist at Oxford known for determining the chemical structure of antibodies.
- Addy Pross (b. 1945), Israeli-Australian researcher of abiogenesis from a chemistry perspective
- Frank W. Putnam (1917–2006). American biochemist at the Indiana University, who worked on the structure and function of blood proteins. Member Natl. Acad. Sci. USA.

== Q ==
- Juda Hirsch Quastel FRS (1899–1987). British-Canadian biochemist at the Rothamsted Experimental Station and McGill University, known for research in neurochemistry, metabolism and cancer.
- Osbourne Quaye. Ghanaian biochemist

== R ==
=== Ra ===
- Efraim Racker (1913–1991). Austrian-American biochemist at Cornell University, notable for work on ATP synthase. Member Natl. Acad. Sci. USA.
- George Radda FRS (1936–2024). Hungarian biochemist at Oxford University, known for applying nuclear magnetic resonance to complex biological material, and many other contributions.
- Ronald T. Raines (b. 1958). American biochemist at the University of Wisconsin–Madison and MIT, known for work on enzymes and other proteins.
- Venkatraman Ramakrishnan FRS (President) (b. 1952). Indian-British-American structural biologist at the MRC Laboratory of Molecular Biology, Cambridge, known for work on the ribosome. Nobel Prize in Chemistry in 2009.
- Philip Randle (1926–2006). British biochemist at the University of Bristol known for work on diabetes.
- Samuel Mitja Rapoport (1912–2004). Austrian and German biochemist at the Humboldt University, Berlin noted for studies of mitochondria, and for discovering a method for preserving blood for transfusions. Leader of biochemistry in the German Democratic Republic. Member of the German Academy of Sciences at Berlin.
- Tom Rapoport (b. 1947). German-American cell biologist at Harvard Medical School who studies protein transport in cells.

=== Re–Ru ===
- Lynne Regan (Ph.D. 1987). British biochemist and biotechnologist at the University of Edinburgh which studies interactions between proteins and nucleic acids.
- Jens Reich (b. 1939). German biophysicist at the Central Institute of Molecular Biology of the Academy of Sciences in Berlin-Buch, pioneer in systems biology. Founder of the New Forum (civil rights movement).
- Jacques Ricard (1929–2018). French biochemist at the Institut Jacques Monod known for studies of plant enzymes and for developing the concept of enzyme memory.
- David Rittenberg (1906–1970). American biochemist at Columbia, a pioneer in the use of radioactive tracers to study metabolism. Member Natl. Acad. Sci. USA.
- Alexander Rich (1924–2015). American biophysicist at MIT, whose many contributions included elucidation of the structure of collagen (with Francis Crick). Member Natl. Acad. Sci. USA.
- Jane S. Richardson (b. 1941). American biophysicist at Duke University, known for the ribbon diagram, a method of representing the 3D structures of proteins. Member Natl. Acad. Sci. USA.
- Thorburn Brailsford Robertson (1884–1930), Australian physiologist and biochemist, known for promoting the use of insulin for diabetes in Australia.
- Dame Carol V. Robinson (b. 1956), British chemist and mass spectroscopist at the University of Oxford known for studies of protein folding.
- Robert G. Roeder (b. 1942), American biochemist, pioneer in eukaryotic transcription.
- Irwin Rose (1926–2015). American biochemist at the University of Pennsylvania, noted for the discovery of ubiquitin-mediated protein degradation. Nobel Prize in Chemistry (2004). Member Natl. Acad. Sci. USA.
- Barry P. Rosen (b. 1944), American biochemist at Florida International University known for pioneering research into the molecular mechanisms of arsenic and antimony transport and detoxification.
- Sinaida Rosenthal (1932–1988). German biochemist and molecular biologist at the Humboldt University of Berlin who studied molecular biological and genetic aspects of physiology.
- William J. Rutter (1927–2025). American biochemist at the Chiron Corporation who contributed to the development of biotechnology.

== S ==
=== Sa–Sc ===
- Margarita Salas (1938–2019). Spanish biochemist at the Spanish National Research Council. Known for work on DNA replication. First woman elected to the Royal Spanish Academy.
- Wolfram Saenger (1939–2026). German biochemist and protein crystallographer at the Free University of Berlin, known for work on membrane proteins and protein-nucleic acid complexes. Member Natl. Acad. Sci. USA
- Frederick Sanger FRS (1918–2013). British biochemist at Cambridge University, known for advances in sequencing proteins and nucleic acids. Nobel prizes in Chemistry (1958, 1980). Foreign Associate Natl. Acad. Sci. USA.
- Albert Schatz (1920–2005). American microbiologist and science educator at Temple University, the discoverer of the antibiotic streptomycin.
- Paul Schimmel (b. 1940). American biochemist at the Scripps Research Institute, who developed methods of nucleic acid sequencing and coauthored (with Charles Cantor) the very influential three-volume book Biophysical Chemistry. Member Natl. Acad. Sci. USA
- Rudolph Schoenheimer (1898–1941). German-American biochemist at Columbia, pioneer of radioactive tagging of molecules.
- Stefan Schuster (b. 1961). German biophysicist at the University of Jena, pioneer in metabolic control analysis and metabolic pathway analysis.
- Rose Scott-Moncrieff (1903–1991). British biochemical geneticist at the University of Cambridge.

=== Se–So ===
- Michael Sela (1924–2022). Israeli immunologist at the Weizmann Institute, who worked on synthetic antigens, molecules that trigger the immune system to attack. Foreign associate Natl. Acad. Sci. USA.
- Nathan Sharon (1925–2011). Israeli biochemist at the Weizmann Institute of Science, expert on carbohydrates and glycoproteins. Member of the Israel Academy of Sciences and Humanities.
- Anatoly Sharpenak (1895–1969). Russian biochemist at the Russian Academy of Medical Sciences, who studied protein metabolism, and the aetiology and pathogenesis of dental caries.
- Sofia Simmonds (1917–2007). American biochemist at Yale known for work on amino acid and peptide metabolism.
- Karl Slotta (1895–1987). German-American biochemist at the University of Miami who discovered progesterone and studied snake venoms.
- Emil L. Smith (1911–2009). American protein chemist at UCLA, known in particular for studies of protein evolution. Member Natl. Acad. Sci. USA.
- Michael Smith (1932–2000), Canadian biochemist at the University of Wisconsin–Madison. Nobel Prize in Chemistry for developing site-directed mutagenesis
- Oliver Smithies FRS (foreign associate) (1925–2017). British-American geneticist and physical biochemist at the University of North Carolina at Chapel Hill who introduced starch as a medium for gel electrophoresis. Nobel Prize in Physiology or Medicine in 2007.
- Liz Specht (21st century). American research scientist specializing in chemical engineering and synthetic biology
- Alberto Sols (1917–1989). Spanish biochemist at the Spanish National Research Council. Known for studies of hexokinase, and metabolic regulation in general. Member of the Real Academia Nacional de Medicina.

=== St–Sz ===
- Frank Stahl (1929–2025), US molecular biologist known for the Meselson-Stahl experiment
- Donald F. Steiner (1930–2014). American biochemist at the University of Chicago, who made ground breaking discoveries in the treatment of diabetes. Member Natl. Acad. Sci. USA
- Joan Steitz FRS (foreign associate) (b. 1941). American biochemist at Yale University, best known for her work on RNA. Member Natl. Acad. Sci. USA.
- Thomas A. Steitz FRS (foreign associate) (1940–2018). American biochemist at Yale University, best known for his pioneering work on the ribosome. Nobel Prize in Chemistry, 2009. Member Natl. Acad. Sci. USA.
- Marjory Stephenson FRS (one of the first two women elected) (1885-1948). British biochemist and microbiologist at Cambridge University, most widely remembered for her seminal book, Bacterial Metabolism.
- Audrey Stevens (1932–2010). American biochemist at Oak Ridge National Laboratory, co-discoverer of RNA polymerase. Member Natl. Acad. Sci. USA.
- Bruce Stone (1928–2008). Australian biochemist known for work in cereal and grass polysaccharides. Foundation Professor of Biochemistry at La Trobe University (1972–1993).
- Lubert Stryer (1938–2024). American biophysicist at Stanford who pioneered the use of fluorescence spectroscopy, particularly Förster resonance energy transfer, to monitor the structure and dynamics of biological macromolecules. He is best known for his textbook Biochemistry. Member Natl. Acad. Sci. USA.
- Paul K. Stumpf (1919–2007) was an American biochemist at the University of California, Davis, known for work in the field of plant biochemistry. Member Natl. Acad. Sci. USA. Author, with Joe Neilands of Outlines of Enzyme Chemistry.
- Albert Szent-Györgyi (1893–1986). Hungarian biochemist at Woods Hole, Massachusetts, the first to isolate vitamin C. He discovered the components and reactions of the TCA cycle. Nobel Prize in Physiology or Medicine in 1937. Member Natl. Acad. Sci. USA.

== T ==
- Celia White Tabor (1918–2012). American biochemist at the NIH, expert on the biosynthesis of polyamines.
- Herbert Tabor (1918–2020). American biochemist at NIH who studied the function of polyamines and their role in human health and disease. He was editor-in-chief of the Journal of Biological Chemistry for nearly 40 years. Member Natl. Acad. Sci. USA.
- Charles Tanford (1921–2009). American protein chemist at Duke University, known for analysis of the hydrophobic effect. Member Natl. Acad. Sci. USA.
- Ignacio Tinoco Jr. (1930–2016). American chemist at UC Berkeley, known for his pioneering work on RNA folding. Member Natl. Acad. Sci. USA.
- Arne Tiselius FRS (foreign associate) (1902–1971). Swedish biochemist at the University of Uppsala, who developed protein electrophoresis. Nobel Prize for Chemistry (1948). Foreign associate Natl. Acad. Sci. USA.
- Victor Trikojus CBE (1902–1985). Australian biochemist, head of the School of Biochemistry at the University of Melbourne (1943–1968). Joint discoverer of triiodothyronine (T_{3}) with Frank Hird in 1948.
- Chen-Lu Tsou (邹承鲁 Zou Chenglu in Pinyin, 1923–2006). Chinese biochemist at the Academia Sinica, known for work on enzyme inactivation kinetics, and even more as the "face of Chinese biochemistry" for many years in the west. Member of the Academia Sinica.

== U ==
- Tito Ureta (1935–2012) Chilean biochemist at the University of Chile known for work on hexokinases.
- Merton F. Utter (1917–1980). American microbiologist and biochemist at Case Western Reserve University, known for work on intermediary metabolism. Member Natl. Acad. Sci. USA.

== V ==
- Pablo Valenzuela (b. 1941). Chilean biochemist and biotechnologist at Chiron Corporation (Emeryville, California), known for his genetic studies of hepatitis viruses. Member of the Chilean Academy of Sciences.
- Ruth van Heyningen (1917–2019). British biochemist at Oxford University, known for her research on the lens and cataracts.
- Donald Van Slyke (1883–1971). Dutch American biochemist at the Brookhaven National Laboratory noted for the measurement of gas and electrolyte levels in tissues. A unit of measurement for buffering activity, the slyke, is named after him. Member Natl. Acad. Sci. USA.
- John Craig Venter (1946–2026). American biotechnologist at the J. Craig Venter Institute (Rockville, Maryland), known for human genome sequencing. Member Natl. Acad. Sci. USA.
- Donald Voet (1938–2023). American biochemist at the University of Pennsylvania known for his textbook Biochemistry.
- Judith G. Voet (b. 1941). American biochemist at Swarthmore College known for her textbook Biochemistry.

== W ==
=== Wa ===
- John E. Walker FRS (b. 1941). British biochemist at Cambridge University, known for studies of ATPases and ATP synthase. Nobel Prize for Chemistry (1997). Foreign associate Natl. Acad. Sci. USA.
- Michael Wakelam (1955–2020). British molecular biologist at Babraham Institute, Cambridge
- Selman Waksman (1888–1973). Ukrainian-American biochemist at Rutgers University, known for discovering streptomycin and other antibiotics. Nobel Prize in Physiology or Medicine (1952).
- Christopher T. Walsh (1944–2023). American biochemist at Harvard, known for work on enzymes and enzyme inhibition, and especially for his book Enzymatic Reaction Mechanisms. Member Natl. Acad. Sci. USA.
- James C. Wang, (b. 1938). Chinese-American biochemist at Harvard, known for the discovery of topoisomerases. Member Natl. Acad. Sci. USA
- Xiaodong Wang, (b. 1963), Chinese-American biochemist at the National Institute of Biological Sciences, Peking, known for his work with cytochrome c. Member Natl. Acad. Sci. USA.
- Otto Heinrich Warburg FRS (foreign member) (1883–1970). German biochemist at the Kaiser Wilhelm Institute for Cell Physiology (Berlin), who pioneered the study of respiration. Nobel Prize in Physiology or Medicine (1931).
- Arieh Warshel (b. 1940). Israeli-American biochemist and biophysicist at the University of Southern California, a pioneer in computational studies on functional properties of biological molecules. Nobel Prize in Chemistry (2013). Member Natl. Acad. Sci. USA. Foreign member of the Russian Academy of Sciences.
- James D. Watson FRS (foreign member) (1928–2025). American molecular biologist at the Cold Spring Harbor Laboratory, who proposed the double helical structure of DNA, with Francis Crick. Nobel Prize in Physiology or Medicine (1962). Member Natl. Acad. Sci. USA

=== We–Wh ===
- Edwin C. Webb (1921–2006). British (later Australian) biochemist at the University of Queensland and Macquarie University. Editor of Enzyme Nomenclature until 1992.
- Gregorio Weber (1916–1997). Argentinian spectroscopist at the University of Illinois, who pioneered the application of fluorescence spectroscopy to the biological sciences. Member Natl. Acad. Sci. USA, National Academy of Sciences of Argentina.
- Stephen C. West FRS (b. 1952). British biochemist at the Francis Crick Institute, London, known for his work on DNA recombination and repair. Foreign Associate Natl. Acad. Sci. USA.
- Hans Westerhoff (b. 1953). Dutch biochemist at the Universities of Amsterdam and of Manchester, known for work in systems biology and metabolic regulation.
- Frank Henry Westheimer (1912–2007). American chemist at Harvard who did pioneering work in physical organic chemistry, applying techniques from physical to organic chemistry and integrating the two fields. Member Natl. Acad. Sci. USA.
- John Westley (b. 1927). American enzymologist at the University of Chicago known for work on rhodanese and sulfurtransferases in general.
- Frederick Whatley (1924–2020). British botanist and biochemist at the University of Sydney known for work on photosynthesis.
- William Joseph Whelan FRS (1924–2021). British-American biochemist at the University of Miami, who worked on the structure of glycogen, and discovered the protein glycogenin at its core. He was very active in the creation of international organizations, including the IUB (now IUBMB) and FEBS.

=== Wi–Wr ===
- William T. Wickner (b. 1946). American biochemist at Dartmouth Medical School, an authority on membrane fusion and inheritance. Member Natl. Acad. Sci. USA.
- Meir Wilchek (b. 1935). Israeli biochemist at the Weizmann Institute of Science, known especially for his work on affinity chromatography.
- Maurice Wilkins FRS (1916–2004). New Zealand and British x-ray crystallographer at King's College London, whose work on DNA played an essential part in recognizing its double-helical structure. Nobel Prize in Physiology or Medicine (1962).
- Robert Joseph Paton Williams FRS (1926–2015). British bioinorganic chemist at Oxford University, with many contributions to understanding the role of metals in biological systems. Foreign Member of the Swedish, Portuguese, Czechoslovak and Belgian science academies.
- Allan Charles Wilson FRS (1934–1991). New Zealand biochemist and evolutionary biologist at UC Berkeley, a pioneer in molecular approaches to understand evolutionary change and reconstruct phylogenies.
- Friedrich Wöhler (1800–1882). German chemist at the University of Giessen, known for his synthesis of urea from ammonium cyanate (a nail in the coffin of vitalism). Foreign member of the Royal Swedish Academy of Sciences.
- Richard Wolfenden (1935–2025). British-American biochemist at the University of North Carolina, known for work on the kinetics of enzyme-catalysed reactions. Member Natl. Acad. Sci. USA.
- Harland G. Wood (1907–1991). American biochemist at Case Western Reserve University, known for work on use of carbon dioxide by animals and bacteria. Member Natl. Acad. Sci. USA.
- Barnet Woolf FRSE (1902–1983). British biochemist at Edinburgh University, geneticist, epidemiologist, statistician, etc.
- Louis Isaac Woolf (1919–2021). British biochemist at the University of British Columbia who played a crucial role in early detection (via neonatal screening) and treatment of phenylketonuria.
- Dorothy Wrinch (1894–1976). British mathematical biologist at Johns Hopkins University and Smith College who argued for the cyclol structure for proteins.

== X ==
- António Xavier (1943–2006). Portuguese biophysicist at Universidade Nova de Lisboa, expert in application of magnetic resonance in biochemistry.

== Y ==
- Ada Yonath (1939–2026). Israeli crystallographer at the Weizmann Institute of Science, best known for her pioneering work on the structure of the ribosome. Nobel Prize in Chemistry (2009). Member Natl. Acad. Sci. USA.
- Frank Young FRS (1908–1988). British biochemist at Cambridge University, where he was Sir William Dunn Professor for many years.
- William John Young (1878–1942). British biochemist at the University of Melbourne who worked on fermenting enzymes in yeast extract, and discovered “Harden–Young ester” (fructose 1,6-bisphosphate).

== Z ==
- Shuguang Zhang (PhD 1988). American biochemist at the Massachusetts Institute of Technology, known for his discovery of self-assembling peptides. Guggenheim Fellow and Member, Austrian Academy of Sciences.
- Donald Zilversmit (1919–2010). Dutch-American nutritional biochemist at Cornell University, with many contributions to the understanding of the relationship between diet and cardiovascular disease. Member Natl. Acad. Sci. USA.

== See also ==
Scientists in fields close to biochemistry

- List of biologists (classified)
- List of biophysicists
- List of chemists
- List of geneticists
- List of immunologists
- List of microbiologists
- List of physiologists
