= Robert Schmitz =

Robert Schmitz may refer to:

- Bob Schmitz (1939–2004), American football player
- E. Robert Schmitz (1889–1949), Franco-American pianist and composer
- Robert J. Schmitz, American plant biologist and epigenomicist
- Robert J. Schmitz (politician) (1921–1999), American farmer, businessman, and politician in Minnesota
