= Marilyn Anderson =

Australian scientist

Marilyn Anderson AO
- Born: 2 February 1951; Melbourne
- Education: University of Melbourne, La Trobe University
- Occupations: Biochemist; botanist
- Awards: Fellow of the Australian Academy of Science (2011); Officer of the Order of Australia (For distinguished service to science, and to higher education, particularly to biochemistry and molecular biology, as an academic and researcher, and to professional associations., Professor Marilyn Anne ANDERSON, 2016); Lemberg Medal (2014); Victorian Honour Roll of Women (2014)
- Scientific career
- Fields: Biochemistry, agricultural biotechnology, pharmaceutical sciences
- Workplaces: La Trobe University (2004–); Hexima (2009–)
- Doctoral advisor: Bruce A. Stone
- Website: scholars.latrobe.edu.au/display/maanderson

Marilyn Anderson AO is an Australian scientist and entrepreneur in the area of biochemistry and plant molecular biology. She is a professor at La Trobe University and co-founded Hexima, an agribiotechnology company, in 1998.

== Biography ==
Anderson studied biochemistry at the University of Melbourne, followed by La Trobe University for her doctoral studies, which she completed in 1976. Her area of focus was polysaccharide hydrolases and carbohydrate chemistry, an area she continued working on during her first research position, at the University of Miami. She later worked on the SV40 virus and oncogenes, and then moved to Cold Spring Harbor Laboratory, where she worked on the oncogenes from adenovirus.

In 1982, Anderson returned to Australia and worked with Adrienne Clarke to establish molecular biology at the new Plant Cell Biology Research Centre at the University of Melbourne. There she was involved in the discovery of the molecular basis of self-incompatibility in flowering plants. In 1995, Anderson moved back to La Trobe University, where she researches defence molecules produced by plants to protect themselves against pests. In 1998, Anderson and Clarke co-founded a business, Hexima, to develop practical applications of this research.

== Awards and recognition ==
Anderson is a Fellow of the Australian Academy of Technological Sciences and Engineering (elected 2010), a Fellow of the Australian Academy of Science (elected 2011) and a Fellow of the Australian Institute of Company Directors.

She was inducted into the Victorian Honour Roll of Women in 2014.

Anderson received the Lemberg Medal from the Australian Society for Biochemistry and Molecular Biology in 2014 and the Leach Medal from the Lorne Protein Society in 2017. She and her research partner David Craik received the Ramachiotti Biomedical Research Award in 2015.

In the 2016 Australia Day Honours Anderson was made an Officer of the Order of Australia (AO) for "distinguished service to science, and to higher education, particularly to biochemistry and molecular biology, as an academic and researcher, and to professional associations".
