= David S. Cafiso =

American biochemist

- Born: March 18, 1952 (age 74)
- Education: UC Berkeley
- Scientific career
- Fields: Physiology; Biophysics; Biochemistry; Structural Biology
- Workplaces: University of Virginia

David S. Cafiso (born March 18, 1952) is an American biochemist and a professor of chemistry at the University of Virginia. His research focuses on membrane proteins and cell signaling, and is primarily supported by grants from the National Institute of Health.

== Research ==
Work in Dr. Cafiso's laboratory is directed at studying membranes and peripheral and integral membrane proteins. One area of investigation involves studies on the mechanisms by which proteins become attached to membrane surfaces. Attachment is critical for cell-signaling because it controls protein–protein interactions and the access of enzymes to lipid substrates. For example, the oncogenic form of the src tyrosine kinase is not active and fails to transform cells until it becomes attached to the cytoplasmic face of the plasma membrane. The laboratory is currently determining the structure and electrostatic interactions made by highly positively charged protein motifs, such as those from MARCKS (the myristoylated alanine rich C-kinase substrate) with negatively charged lipid surfaces. In addition to regulating membrane attachment, these positively charged motifs function to sequester phosphatidylinositol 4,5, bisphosphate (PIP2), and regulate the activity of this phosphorylated inositol lipid within the cytoplasmic membrane. Dr. Cafiso is also interested in determining the membrane interactions made by protein domains such as C2 domains, which are found in a wide range of proteins involved in cell signaling. C2 domains function to attach their parent proteins to membranes in a Ca ++ dependent fashion. C2 domains perform critical roles in membrane trafficking, membrane fusion and membrane repair, and defects in these domains result in forms of muscular dystrophy and deafness.

A second area of investigation involves membrane transport. Dr. Cafiso's laboratory is currently examining the molecular mechanisms that function to facilitate active transport. For example, he is interested in determining the molecular mechanisms by which BtuB transports vitamin B12 across the outer membrane of Escherichia coli. This protein is homologous to FecA, FepA and FhuA, outer membrane iron transport proteins that presumably function by similar mechanisms. These proteins belong to a class of transport proteins for which high-resolution structural models have been obtained, and they are extremely important for the survival of some bacterial pathogens. In addition to BtuB, FecA and FhuA, his team is expressing, reconstituting and labeling BtuC/D. This protein is member of the ABC cassette transporter family and it is responsible for carrying vitamin B12 across the inner membrane.

The primary tools that Dr. Cafiso uses in his research include EPR spectroscopy and high-resolution NMR. Site-directed spin labeling is a powerful methodology that combines site-directed mutagenesis with and EPR spectroscopy. Dr. Cafiso is developing and making use of this tool, which is particularly well-suited to address questions regarding the dynamics and molecular function of membrane proteins.

== Education and training ==
- Univ. of California, Berkeley, Calif. A.B. 1974 Biophysics
- Univ. of California, Berkeley, Calif. PhD 1979 Biophysics
- Univ. of California, Berkeley, Calif. 1979 – 1980 Postdoctoral Study
- Stanford University, Stanford, Calif. 1980 – 1981 Postdoctoral Study

== Societies, service, and honors ==
- Jane Coffin Childs Foundation Fellow, 1979–1981
- Camille and Henry Dreyfus Award for Distinguished New Faculty in Chemistry, 1981
- Member, NSF Biophysics Panel, 1990–1993. Member, NIH IRG Study Section
- Ad Hoc Member, NIH BBCB study section, 1996–present
- NIH Biomembranes Study Section, 2005
- Editorial board, Biophysical Journal
- Editorial board, Journal of Liposome Research
- Editorial board, Cell Biochemistry and Biophysics
- Biophysical Society: 1978–present
- American Association for the Advancement of Science: 1980–present
- American Chemical Society: 1981–present
- Contributor, Faculty of 1000: 2001–present
