= Gösta Pettersson (disambiguation) =

Gösta Pettersson may refer to

- Göta Pettersson (1926–1993), Swedish gymnast
- Gösta Pettersson (born 1940), Swedish cyclist
- Gösta Pettersson (biochemist) (born 1937), Swedish biochemist
