= Paul K. Stumpf =

American biochemist (1919–2007)

- Born: February 23, 1919; New York City, US
- Died: February 10, 2007 (aged 87)
- Education: Harvard University (A.B.; Columbia University (Ph.D.)
- Known for: Outlines of Enzyme Chemistry, Pioneering the study of the biochemistry of lipids (fats and oils) in plants
- Scientific career
- Fields: Plant biochemistry
- Institutions: University of California, Berkeley, University of California, Davis

Paul K. Stumpf (February 23, 1919 – February 10, 2007) was an American biochemist, "a world leader in the field of plant biochemistry" according to the National Academy of Sciences and the University of California. Specifically the University of California said that "Stumpf pioneered the study of the biochemistry of lipids (fats and oils) in plants". Stumpf was chairman of the department of Biochemistry and Biophysics, a member of the National Academy of Sciences, and a fellow of the American Academy of Arts and Sciences.

In 1958, he and his colleague Joe Neilands co-authored a very influential textbook, Outlines of Enzyme Chemistry.

He was a recipient of the following distinctions and awards:

- 1961 and 1969: twice a Guggenheim Fellow.
- 1974: the Stephen Hales Prize from the American Society of Plant Physiologists
- 1975: elected a member of the Royal Danish Academy of Sciences
- 1978: elected a member of the National Academy of Sciences
- 1980: president of the American Society of Plant Physiologists
- 1986–1990: chairman of the board of trustees of the American Society of Plant Physiologists
- 1992: the Charles Reid Barnes Life Membership the American Society of Plant Physiologists
- the Lipid Chemistry Prize from the American Oil Chemists Society
- Senior Scientist Award from the Alexander von Humboldt Foundation of Germany
- 1994: elected a fellow of the American Academy of Arts and Sciences
- Recognized as a Pioneer Member of the American Society of Plant Biologists.

== Basic chronology ==
- 1919: born in New York City on February 23
- 1941: A.B. magna cum laude from Harvard University
- 1945: Ph.D. in biochemistry, Columbia University
- 1948: an assistant professor, University of California, Berkeley
- 1958: moves to University of California, Davis the Department of Biochemistry and Biophysics
- 1984: retires
