= Ethel Ronzoni Bishop =

American biochemist (1890-1975)

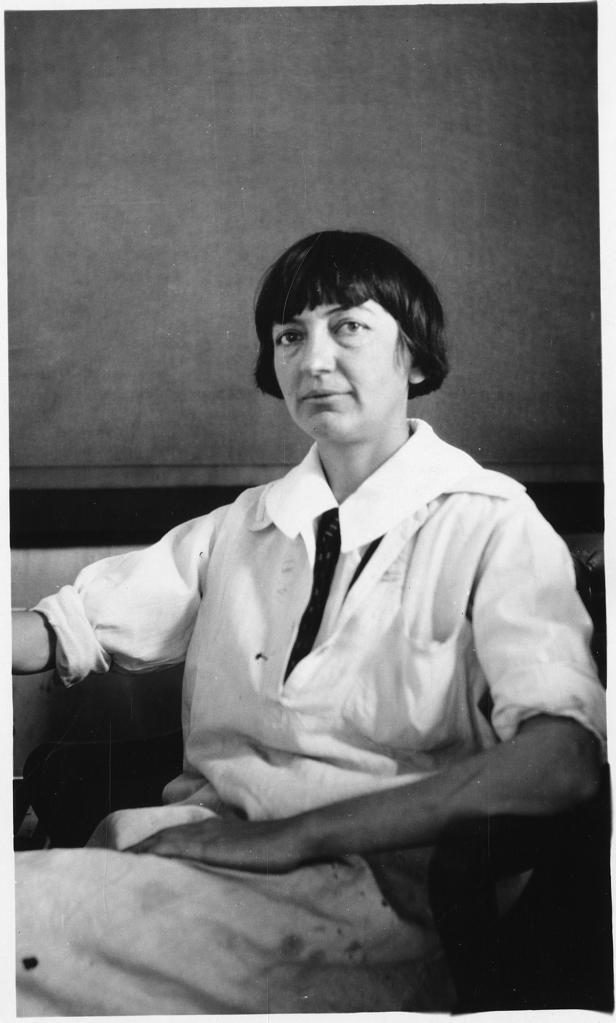
- Born: August 21, 1890; California
- Died: 1975 (aged 84–85)
- Education: Mills College; Columbia University; University of Wisconsin
- Years active: 1914-1959
- Spouse: George Holman Bishop (m. 1922; died 1973)
- Parents: Mary Espy; Silvio Ronzoni
- Scientific career
- Fields: Biochemistry
- Institutions: University of Missouri; University of Minnesota; Washington University in St. Louis

Ethel Ronzoni Bishop (b. August 21, 1890 – 1975) was an American biochemist and physiologist.

== Early life and education ==
Ethel Ronzoni was born in California. She earned her BS degree from Mills College in 1913, her Master's from Columbia University in 1914, and her Ph.D. from the University of Wisconsin in 1923.

== Work ==
Ronzoni was an instructor of home economics at the University of Missouri from 1914 to 1917, and was assistant professor of Home Economics at the University of Minnesota for the 1917–18 academic year.

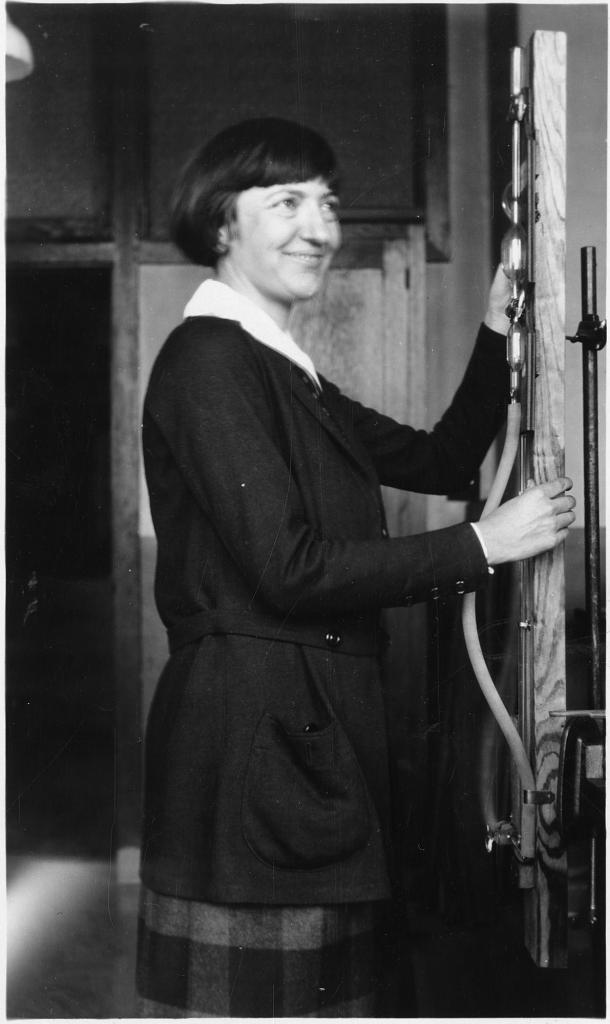
Ethel Ronzoni

Following her Ph.D., Ronzoni joined the Washington University School of Medicine in 1923, where she worked as an assistant professor until 1943; she appears to be the first woman to have joined the school's academic faculty. While there, she ran the chemistry lab of the Department of Medicine and Barnes Hospital. In 1943 she was promoted to associate professor of biochemistry, a position she held until her retirement in 1959. After World War II, she switched to neuropsychiatry and ran the lab in the Department of Psychiatry.

As a researcher, Ronzoni's main focus was carbohydrate metabolism. She also researched amino acid metabolism, steroid hormones and muscle biochemistry.

== Personal life ==
While attending the University of Wisconsin, Ronzoni met George Holman Bishop. Bishop also worked at Washington University. Ronzoni and Bishop lived in the historical William Long Log House; after the death of Ronzoni in 1975, St. Louis County took over the home.
