= Bruce A. Stone =

Australian biochemist

- Born: 4 December 1928
- Died: 29 June 2008 (aged 79)
- Education: University of Melbourne University College, London
- Awards: F. B. Guthrie Award for Cereal Chemistry, Royal Australian Chemical Institute (1985) Philippine Biochemical Society Award (1991) Thomas Burr Osborne Award of the American Association of Cereal Chemists (2004) Member of the Order of Australia (2008)
- Scientific career
- Fields: Cereal chemistry Polysaccharide research
- Institutions: University of Melbourne, La Trobe University
- Doctoral advisor: Eric Crook
- Notable students: Marilyn Anderson

Signature
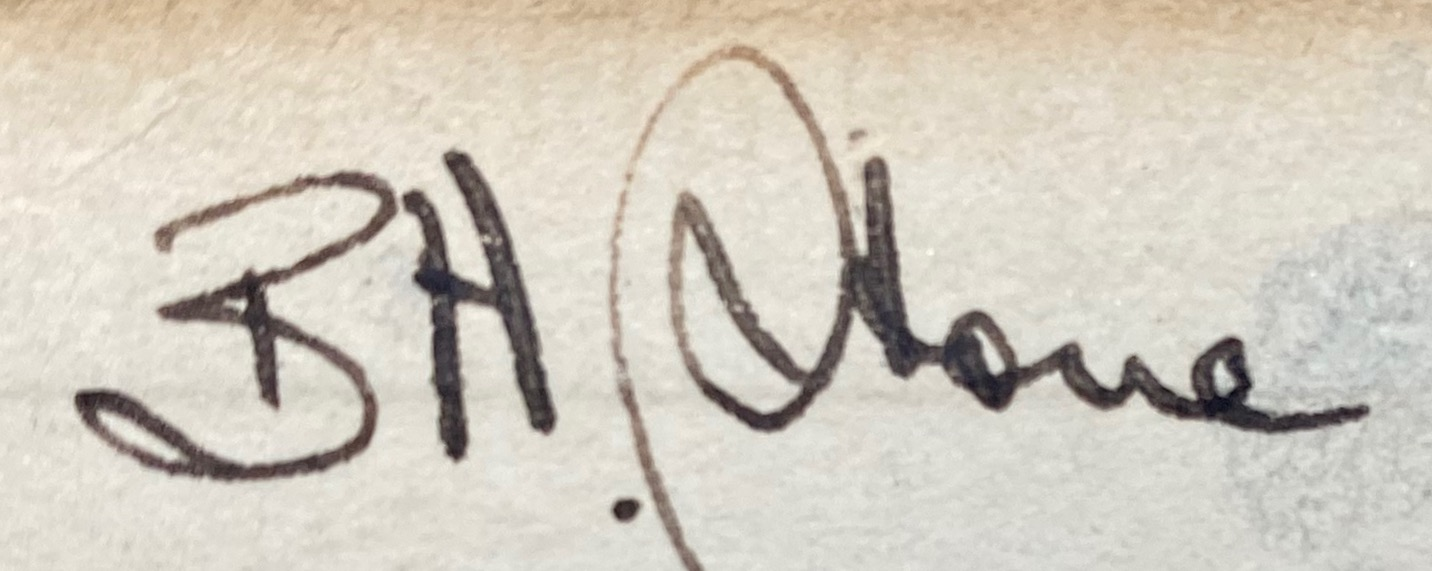

Bruce Arthur Stone AM (4 December 1928 – 29 June 2008) was an Australian biochemist and the foundation Professor of Biochemistry at La Trobe University.

Born in 1928, Stone earned a B.Sc. from the University of Melbourne in 1948, majoring in chemistry and biochemistry. In 1951, he received training in mycological taxonomy at the Commonwealth Mycological Institute in Kew, UK, which he disliked. He pursued his Ph.D. studies at University College, London, graduating in 1954. He held postdoctoral positions in Ottawa and London. He then joined the Russell Grimwade School of Biochemistry, University of Melbourne, in 1958 and later became the first Professor of Biochemistry at La Trobe University, where he served from 1972 until his official retirement in 1995. Nick Hoogenraad wrote of him: “Bruce built his department with a strong focus on research and from his staff demanded nothing but the best. A comment to a staff member seen arriving at work at 9:30am of 'did you bring the Herald' was taken as more than a throw away line."

Stone's primary research interest was in the chemistry and biochemistry of plant polysaccharides, particularly in cereals and grasses. His work had applications in agriculture, horticulture, cereal grain quality, and human and ruminant nutrition. His special focus on the plant cell wall polysaccharide callose and related (1–3)-beta-D-glucans dates back to his Ph.D. studies and continued at the University of Melbourne under Victor Trikojus from around 1960.

Stone died after a protracted battle with cancer in 2008. His legacy continues through the B.A. Stone Award for Excellence in Plant Polysaccharide Biochemistry.
