= La Trobe Institute for Molecular Science =

- Established: 2009; 17 years ago
- Mission: Translational medical research
- Director: Patrick Humbert
- Faculty: La Trobe University
- Staff: approx. 400 (2016)
- Location: Bundoora, Melbourne, Victoria, Australia
- Coordinates: 37°43′12″S 145°02′51″E
- Interactive map of La Trobe Institute for Molecular Science
- Website: www.latrobe.edu.au/lims

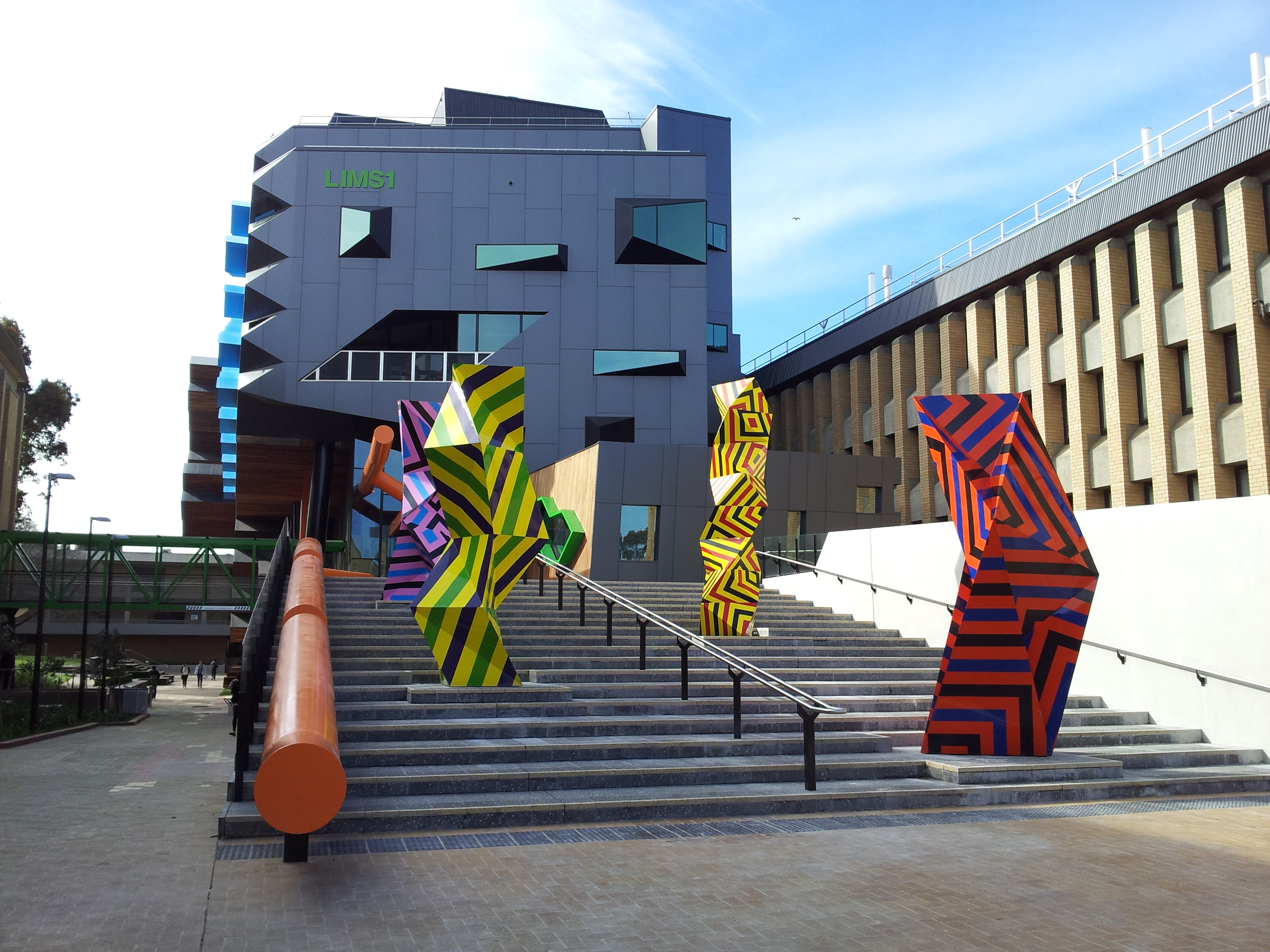
LIMS1 building featuring 'Murri Totems' by Reko Rennie

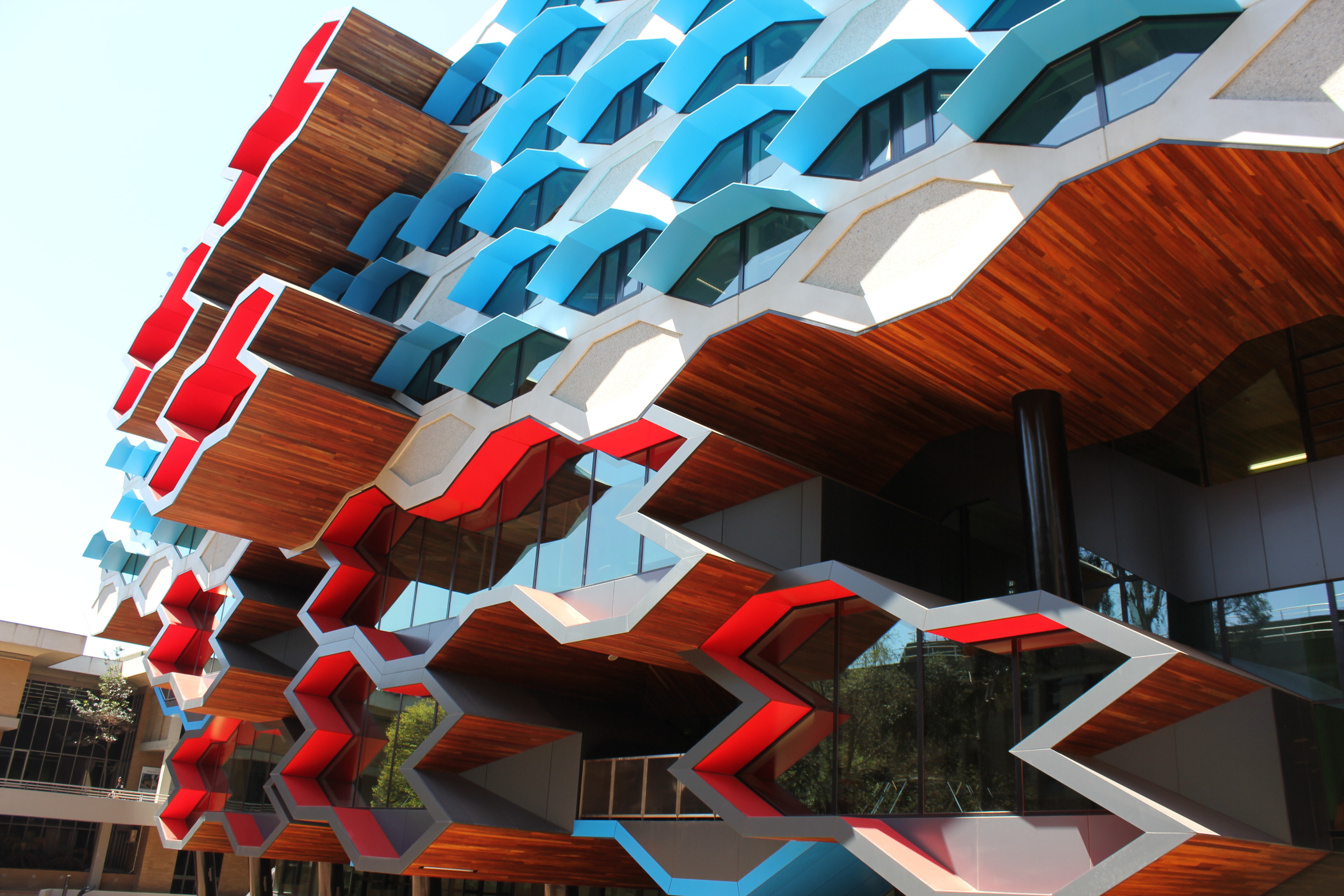
Molecular-inspired windows

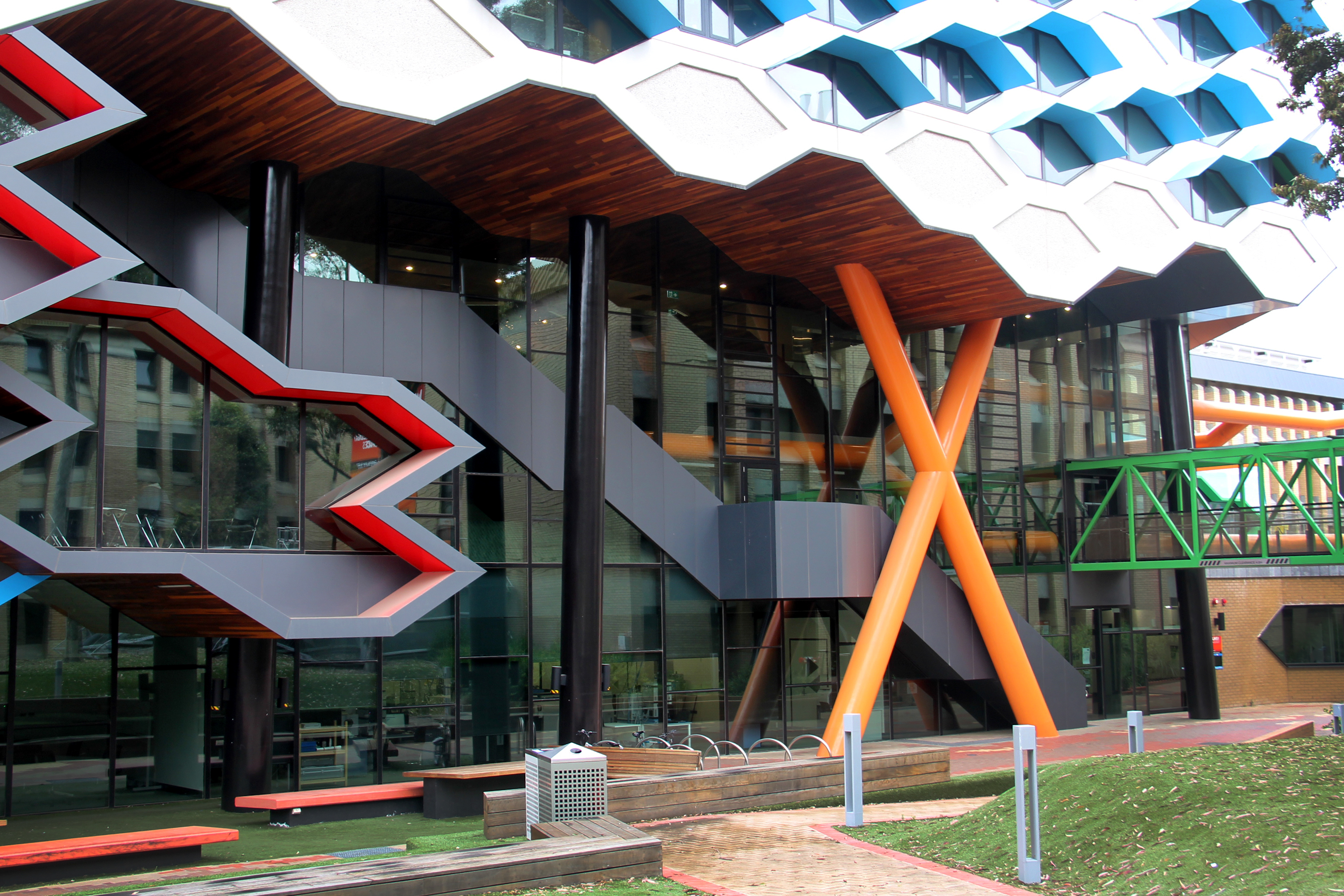
X and Y chromosomes are part of the genetics of the LIMS1 building

The La Trobe Institute for Molecular Science (LIMS) is an Australian institute based at La Trobe University in Melbourne. It contains research groups in life sciences (biochemistry and genetics), physical sciences (chemistry and physics), and applied sciences (pharmacy) and teaches undergraduate and graduate courses in these areas through the School of Molecular Sciences. Established in 2009, the institute has been led by Professor Patrick Humbert since 2022.

It also contains two biotech companies: Hexima and AdAlta. The institute is housed in three buildings: LIMS1 and LIMS2 on La Trobe University's main campus in Bundoora, and the Applied Science building on the Bendigo campus.

== Research ==
Research in the institute is organised into six strategic themes, each with an appointed leader who oversees research.

- Cancer; research includes metastasis, cell crosstalk, anti-tumour immunity, and therapeutic resistance and sensitivity.
- Infection and Immunity; research includes development of antibiotic, anti-inflammatory, and anti-autoimmune compounds.
- Neurobiology; research includes Alzheimer's, Parkinson's, multiple sclerosis, and prions.
- Molecular Design; research includes protein-drug interaction, molecular synthesis, and surface and material science.
- Molecular Sensing; research includes medical diagnostics, environmental sensing, food testing, and remote atmospheric sensing.
- Molecular Imaging; research includes X-ray crystallography, NMR, spectroscopy, and microscopy.

=== Facilities ===
The institute has two in-house platform facilities that offer support to La Trobe staff and students, as well as external clients. The La Trobe Bioimaging Platform offers flow cytometry, histology, and electron and optical microscopy services, and the La Trobe Proteomics and Metabolomics Platform offers bioinformatics, genomics, nuclear magnetic resonance (NMR), and mass spectrometry services. Each capability is managed by a dedicated support staff.

It additionally houses inductively coupled plasma (ICP) equipment, atomic absorption spectrometer (AAS), X-Ray diffractometer, crystallography, and laser research. La Trobe University's Biochemistry and Cell Biology research was ranked equal top with just one other University in the Australian Research Council's 2012 ERA report.

Research groups in the institute have multiple collaborations and links to industry, and the institute hosts two biotechnology companies: AdAlta Pty Ltd and Hexima Ltd. AdAlta develops single-domain antibodies for use as therapeutics and diagnostics. Hexima focusses on commercialising plant-derived proteins and peptides for crop genetic engineering and human antimicrobial and anti-cancer therapeutics.

== History ==
LIMS was launched in 2009 as an institute dedicated to the study of molecular structures and processes fundamental to life. The institute was established with a A$100 million in building funds from the Australian Government and La Trobe University. In 2015 the institute released its new stated vision to conduct multidisciplinary research in six key areas of research strength: cancer, infection and immunity, neurobiology, molecular design, molecular imaging and molecular sensing. Professor Nick Hoogenraad served as the institute's director from its founding in 2009 until his retirement in 2014, when the LIMS1 Auditorium was named after him. Professor Robert Pike joined La Trobe as director of LIMS in 2015. He was succeeded by Andrew Hill in 2017.

=== LIMS1 building ===
The institute's newest building, LIMS1, was designed by Lyons Architects, who were appointed following a design competition sponsored by the Australian Institute of Architects. Construction began in August 2011, with an official sod turning presided by the Minister for Innovation, Industry, Science and Research, Senator Kim Carr. The building was officially opened in February 2013 by the Parliamentary Secretary for Higher Education and Skills, Sharon Bird MP.

The LIMS1 building is an 11,000-square-metre (120,000 sq ft), six-storey, molecular sciences research hub containing 34 laboratories, with research, support and teaching facilities. It is interconnected with the LIMS2 building, an existing adjacent building, allowing co-location of research and support staff. The building's lower levels accommodate undergraduate learning spaces, with open, flexible laboratories (accommodating up to 160 students) connected to “dry” teaching rooms. The top three levels of the building contain large interdisciplinary laboratories shared by multiple research teams. The cellular facade features chromosomal design features that reflect the molecular research undertaken within the building, and is surrounded by landscaped courtyards. The LIMS1 building has achieved formal certification for 5 Star Green Star (Design) using the Education Tool Version 1 through the Green Building Council of Australia. Melbourne-based Indigenous artist Reko Rennie was awarded an A$200,000 commission to create 'Murri Totems', an installation located at the entrance of the LIMS building. The artwork consists of four 4.5-metre (15 ft) vertical structures incorporating the five platonic forms – icosahedron, octahedron, star tetrahedron, hexahedron and dodecahedron – and painted with Rennie's traditional pattern.

== Education ==
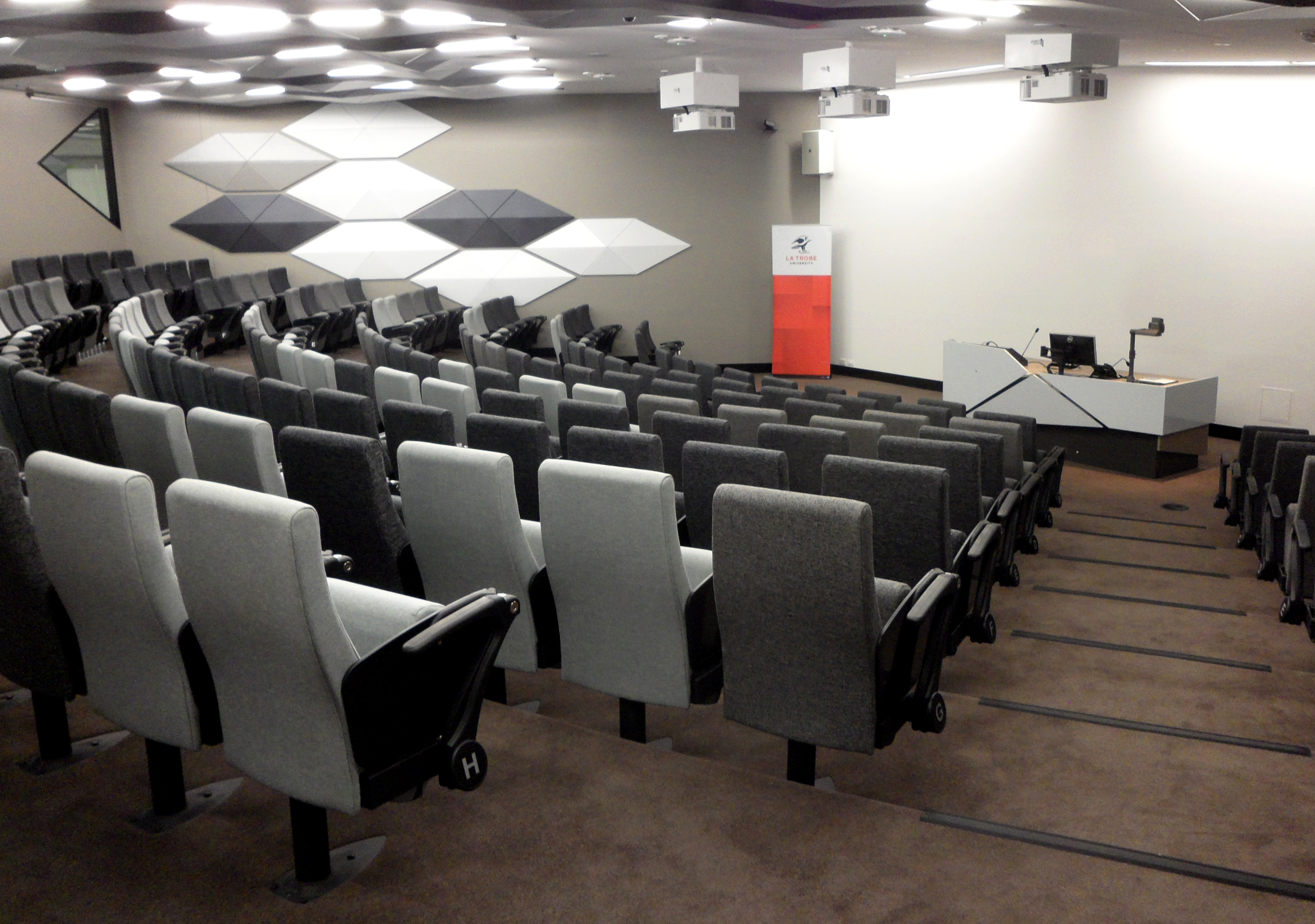
LIMS1 Hoogenraad Auditorium

The research groups in LIMS teach undergraduate and graduate courses for La Trobe University through the School of Molecular Sciences. Teaching is organised into three departments: Biochemistry and Genetics, Chemistry and Physics, and Pharmacy and Applied Science. The first three floors of the LIMS1 building contain teaching laboratories, preparation and support rooms, and a 200-seat auditorium. Additional teaching facilities are spread through the other institute buildings. In addition, LIMS is committed to stimulating an interest in science amongst secondary school students through outreach programs.

=== Undergraduate ===
LIMS collaborates with other La Trobe University departments to teach subjects in several 3-year bachelor's degrees, each with the option of a further 1-year research honours degree.

- Bachelor of Science
- Bachelor of Biological Sciences
- Bachelor of Biomedical Science
- Bachelor of Science and Society
- Bachelor of Pharmacy (Department of Pharmacy and Applied Science; Bendigo campus)

=== Postgraduate ===
The institute also runs 2-year master's degree courses.

- Master of Nanotechnology
- Master of Chemical Sciences
- Master of Biotechnology and Bioinformatics

Doctor of Philosophy degrees are also available through the research laboratories housed in LIMS.

== See also ==
- Health in Australia
