= Joe Neilands =

American biochemist

- Born: September 11, 1921; Glen Valley (near Vancouver), British Columbia
- Died: October 23, 2008 (aged 87)
- Education: Ontario Agricultural College (University of Guelph), (undergraduate degree, 1944), Dalhousie University (master's degree, 1946), University of Wisconsin, Madison (Ph.D., 1949)
- Known for: Political activism, Outlines of Enzyme Chemistry (with Paul K. Stumpf)
- Spouse: Juanita L'Esperance (1958-his death)
- Children: One son
- Awards: 1958 Guggenheim Fellowship
- Scientific career
- Fields: Biochemistry
- Institutions: University of California, Berkeley
- Thesis: Studies on (I) vitamin and amino acid content of fish and meat products (II) molybdenum toxicity in the rat (III) bound pantothenic acid. (1949)
- Doctoral students: Kary Mullis

John Brian "Joe" Neilands (September 11, 1921 – October 23, 2008) was a Canadian-born American biochemist and professor of biochemistry at the University of California, Berkeley, where he taught from 1951 until his retirement in 1993.

== Early life and education ==
Neilands was born on September 11, 1921, in Glen Valley (near Vancouver), British Columbia, to Thomas Abraham Neilands and Mary Rebecca Neilands (née Harpur), both of whom immigrated from Northern Ireland. He received his undergraduate degree from the Ontario Agricultural College (now part of the University of Guelph) in 1944, his master's degree from Dalhousie University in 1946, and his Ph.D. from the University of Wisconsin, Madison in biochemistry in 1949. He then completed a postdoctoral fellowship at the Karolinska Institutet's Medical Nobel Institute in Stockholm, Sweden.

== Career ==
Neilands joined the faculty of the University of California, Berkeley in 1951 as an assistant professor, where he remained until he retired in 1993. In 1958, he was named a Guggenheim Fellow; during his fellowship, he studied in London, Copenhagen, and Vienna. In 1974, he was named an honorary professor at the University of San Marcos in Peru. One of his doctoral students was Kary Mullis, who received a Ph.D. under his supervision in 1973 and won a Nobel Prize in 1993.

== Research ==
Neilands' main area of research was microbial iron transport. His early research (from 1950 to 1952) focused on enzymes, including the isolation of cytochrome c from different sources, and on identifying its properties. In 1957, he was the first to note that ferrichrome could act as an iron transport agent.

== Books ==
In 1958, Neilands and his colleague Paul K. Stumpf co-authored a textbook, Outlines of Enzyme Chemistry, that has been called "seminal". He also wrote the book Harvest of Death, which discussed the putative dangers of herbicides and defoliants and was published in 1971.

== Political activism ==
Neilands was very active in politics; most notably, in the 1950s, he successfully fought to prevent Pacific Gas and Electric Company from building a nuclear reactor at Bodega Bay. In the late 1960s, he ran, unsuccessfully, for the Berkeley City Council. He also protested against the Vietnam War and the Gulf War on the UC Berkeley campus.

== Death ==
Neilands died on October 23, 2008, at the age of 87, after briefly battling a rare form of tuberculosis.
