= Liz Specht =

Research scientist

Elizabeth Specht
- Education: University of California, San Diego; Johns Hopkins University
- Scientific career
- Workplaces: The Good Food Institute; University of Colorado Boulder
- Thesis: Improving the genetic tractability of the green alga Chlamydomonas reinhardtii (2014)

Elizabeth Specht is an American research scientist with a research background in chemical engineering and synthetic biology, who most recently served as Senior Vice President of Science and Technology at The Good Food Institute. Her work has focused on kickstarting and supporting the emerging alternative protein field by identifying key technology and knowledge gaps and mobilizing researchers and research funding toward those areas.

== Early life and education ==
Specht attended Duke University's Talent Identification Program during high school. She went on to study chemical and bimolecular engineering at Johns Hopkins University. When she joined Johns Hopkins, she thought she wanted to pursue a career in pharmaceutical science, but her experiences during her undergraduate changed her perspective. During her summer holidays she worked in India on an Engineers Without Borders program, where she became motivated to design solutions to help with food production and distribution. She moved to the University of California, San Diego for her doctoral research, where she studied the green alga Chlamydomonas reinhardtii. She was a postdoctoral researcher at the University of Colorado Boulder, where she focused on synthetic biology in the Boulder Sustainability Innovation Lab. In Colorado, she developed biosensors for disease diagnostics. Her experiences in research made her consider the role of synthetic biology in helping to address the climate impacts of animal agriculture.

== Career ==
In 2016, Specht joined The Good Food Institute, where she looks to identify and develop alternative proteins. On leaving academia to work in a non-profit, Specht said, “For much of my scientific career, I felt like the hallowed halls of academia didn’t shine quite as brightly on folks like me who are explicitly motivated to find the ‘low-hanging fruit’ — opportunities for relatively straightforward technology to make a massive impact in the world.” At The Good Food Institute, Specht helps investors understand new technologies, generating capital which can aid research and innovation. She believes that such investment can help to strengthen the sustainability and resilience of food systems.

Specht is responsible for the distribution of funding to develop new sources of plant protein, identify new cell lines for optimized cultivated meat and create steak-like cuts of plant based meat. Seaweed and algae represent one type of alternative protein, which could provide and effective means to feed the world's growing population. In an interview with National Geographic, Specht explained that it was possible to grow microalgae at scale, using bioreactors and LEDs. When lab-grown meat received clearance from the Food and Drug Administration in 2022, Specht explained that it meant that focus could be shifted to “what really matters in this industry, which is scale up”.

== Awards and honors ==
- In 2018, Specht was named one of Grist's 50 "Fixers" working on solutions to humanity's greatest challenges
- In 2022, Vox named Specht in their 2022 Future Perfect 50

== Selected publications ==
- Elizabeth Specht; Shigeki Miyake-Stoner; Stephen Mayfield (2010). "Micro-algae come of age as a platform for recombinant protein production". Biotechnology Letters. 32 (10): 1373–1383. doi:10.1007/s10529-010-0326-5. PMC 2941057. PMID 20556634. Wikidata Q34134908.
- Elizabeth A Specht; Esther Braselmann; Amy E Palmer (2016). "A Critical and Comparative Review of Fluorescent Tools for Live-Cell Imaging". Annual Review of Physiology. 79: 93–117. doi:10.1146/annurev-physiol-022516-034055. PMID 27860833. Wikidata Q38793820.
- Javier A. Gimpel; Elizabeth A. Specht; D. Ryan Georgianna; Stephen P. Mayfield (2013). "Advances in microalgae engineering and synthetic biology applications for biofuel production". Current Opinion in Chemical Biology. 17 (3): 489–495. doi:10.1016/j.cbpa.2013.03.038. PMID 23684717. Wikidata Q38107702.
