= Francis John Raymond Hird =

Australian biochemist

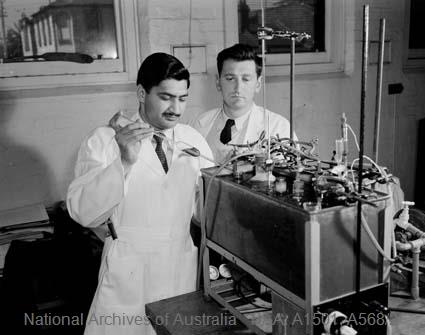
- Hird and student in laboratory, 1957
- Born: 16 June 1920
- Died: 13 November 2014 (aged 94)
- Education: University of Melbourne, Cambridge University
- Known for: Discovery of triiodothyronine
- Scientific career
- Fields: Biochemistry
- Patrons: Victor Trikojus
- Thesis: Collected papers (1962)
- Doctoral advisor: E. V. Rowsell
- Doctoral students: Nick Hoogenraad

Francis John Raymond Hird, better known as Frank Hird or, in print, F. J. R. Hird, was an Australian agricultural biochemist. He was the third head of the Department of Biochemistry at the University of Melbourne (1968–1974).

Frank Hird was born in 1920 and left school at the age of 14. Working as a messenger at the Customs Department, he completed his secondary education through night school in 1941, after which time he worked as a primary school teacher. Hird earned his Bachelor's degree in Agricultural Science with honours in 1944, and his Master's in the same field in 1947. He published a paper regarding work using paper partition chromatography to purify thyroxine with Victor Trikojus, after which he pursued postgraduate work. He completed his PhD at Cambridge University, researching transamination and transpeptidation at the Sir William Dunn Institute of Biochemistry under E. V. Rowsell from 1948 to 1951. In 1953 he received a Fulbright Scholarship and studied with Joseph S. Fruton at Yale University. He was made reader in agricultural biochemistry in 1957 and worked at the University of Oxford and the Carlsberg Laboratory in Denmark. According to a colleague, Hird was a member of the Communist Party of Australia during the 1950s.

In 1962, Hird was awarded a D.Sc. at Melbourne University where he was promoted to Senior Lecturer in agricultural biochemistry. In 1964, Hird was appointed to the newly created second Chair of Biochemistry, on a background of increasing specialisations within the School of Biochemistry. It has been noted that "the discipline of biochemistry at the University of Melbourne owes its foundation to the establishment of the Faculty of Agriculture" and that tensions developed from the overlap of interests and grants between these two schools. Hird applied for and received research grants from the Faculty of Agriculture, which freed him from the centralised control of the head of the Department of Biochemistry, Victor Trikojus. Nonetheless, he was made head of the Department upon Trikojus' retirement in 1968. He was the dean of science in 1972 and remained head of the department until 1974. He retired in 1985.

Hird's impact in biochemistry education is far-reaching, as he "helped train generations of biochemists" while at the Russell Grimwade School of Biochemistry at the University of Melbourne. His research interests were diverse, including metabolic pathways in animals, especially in ruminants, and the uptake of amino acids in plant cells. His expectations were high, as his student, future Professor of biochemistry Nick Hoogenraad recalled: "I loved his lectures. But he was a very tough man... At the end of one year, he took me into his office and said, ‘You can call me Frank now.’ The poor hapless guy in the lab next door heard me calling Frank Hird ‘Frank’ and decided to do the same thing. He was called into Frank Hird's office and told, ‘I will tell you when you can call me Frank’ – very different days from now. He was a difficult man and very demanding. He would stand over me while I was doing experiments." Regarding giving a presentation in the presence of Hird, former student John F. Williams recalled: "If you made a mistake then heaven help you, he was a very tough character to talk to, but an extremely able and interesting biochemist." He was remembered for his "ruthless pruning" of student manuscripts and his outstanding lectures, given entirely without notes, and famously featuring his own Limericks.
