= Biotechnology Letters =

- Discipline: Biotechnology
- Language: English
- Edited by: Steven W. Singer & Paula Meleady

Publication details
- Former name(s): Biotechnology Techniques
- History: 1979–present
- Publisher: Springer Science+Business Media
- Frequency: Biweekly
- Impact factor: 2.461 (2020)

Standard abbreviations
- ISO 4: Biotechnol. Lett.

Indexing
- ISSN: 0141-5492 (print); 1573-6776 (web)

Links
- Journal homepage

Biotechnology Letters is a scientific journal of biotechnology published by Springer Science+Business Media. The editors-in-chief are Steven W. Singer and Paula Meleady. According to the Journal Citation Reports, the journal has a 2020 impact factor of 2.461.
