= Robert J. Schmitz =

American plant biologist

- Born: 1980 (age 45–46)
- Citizenship: United States
- Education: Salk Institute
- Alma mater: University of Arizona, University of Wisconsin, Madison
- Known for: Genome-wide characterization of epialleles
- Scientific career
- Fields: Genomics, Epigenetics, Plant Biology
- Institutions: University of Georgia
- Thesis: Vernalization : a model for investigating epigenetics and eukaryotic gene regulation in Arabidopsis thaliana (2007)
- Doctoral advisor: Richard Amasino
- Other academic advisors: Joseph R. Ecker
- Website: schmitzlab.genetics.uga.edu

Robert J. Schmitz is an American plant biologist and epigenomicist at the University of Georgia where he studies the generation and phenotypic consequences of plant epialleles as well as developing new techniques to identify and study cis-regulatory sequences. He is an associate professor in the department of genetics and the UGA Foundation Endowed Pant Sciences Professor.

== Education and career ==
Schmitz attended the University of Arizona for his bachelors and the University of Wisconsin for his PhD. As a PhD student he worked in the lab of Richard Amasino studying the role of epigenetic modifications on vernalization in Arabidopsis thaliana. He graduated from Wisconsin in 2007. From 2007 to 2013 he was a postdoctoral scholar with Joe Ecker at the Salk Institute. In 2013 he was hired as an assistant professor in the Department of Genetics at the University of Georgia-Athens where he continues to work as an associate professor and director of the Georgia Genomics & Bioinformatics Core.

== Research ==
As a postdoc, Schmitz developed technologies for determining the methylation status of individual cytosines in plant genomes using sequencing technologies, and used them to quantify how methylation patterned varied across different individuals of the same species. He used the same technology to map segregating differentially methylated regions in recombinant inbred populations of soybean, finding underlying genetic haplotype did not consistently predict which parent's methylation state would be observed in a given genotype. He demonstrated that the loss of Chromomethylase 3, a plant methyltransferase abolishes gene body methylation and that this loss has occurred repeatedly in wild plant species.

His research group is working to use epigenetic variation to modify the phenotype of plants. They work with naturally occurring epimutations but have also developed sets of epi-RILs which have identical DNA but different DNA methylation. By using an enzyme from humans, they can remove the methylation from specifically targeted genes in plants, waking up genes which have been long dormant in the genome.

He is also working to apply epigenome profiling to the discovery of noncoding regulatory sequences in different plant species. His lab identified cis-regulatory elements in maize that control the expression of genes that are located long distances away in the genome. They combine ATAC-seq with fluorescence-activated nuclei sorting to identify the locations of open chromatin regions and transcription factor binding sites in plant genomes.

== Recognition ==
- Pew Biomedical Scholar (2015)
- Hans Fischer Fellow, Technical University of Munich (2018)
