= Cell Biochemistry and Biophysics =

- Discipline: Cell biology
- Language: English
- Edited by: Lawrence J. Berliner

Publication details
- Former name(s): Cell Biophysics
- History: 1979–present
- Publisher: Springer Science+Business Media
- Frequency: 9/year
- Impact factor: 2.194 (2020)

Standard abbreviations
- ISO 4: Cell Biochem. Biophys.

Indexing
- CODEN: CBBIFV
- ISSN: 1085-9195 (print); 1559-0283 (web)
- LCCN: 97645818
- OCLC no.: 49728714

Links
- Journal homepage; Online archive

Cell Biochemistry and Biophysics is a peer-reviewed scientific journal covering all aspects of the biology of cells, especially their biochemistry and biophysics. It was established in 1979 as Cell Biophysics with Nicholas Catsimpoolas as founding editor-in-chief, obtaining its current name in 1996. The journal is published by Springer Science+Business Media and the editor-in-chief is Lawrence J. Berliner (University of Denver).

== Abstracting and indexing ==
The journal is abstracted and indexed in:

- AGRICOLA
- BIOSIS Previews
- Chemical Abstracts Service
- CSA Environmental Sciences
- Elsevier Biobase
- EMBASE
- EMBiology
- Index Medicus/MEDLINE/PubMed
- Inspec
- Referativnyi Zhurnal
- Science Citation Index Expanded
- Scopus

According to the Journal Citation Reports, the journal has a 2020 impact factor of 2.194.

== Peer review problems ==
In March 2015 the publisher placed the journal on hold after a pattern of "inappropriate and compromised peer review" was uncovered. Retraction Watch noted that the journal had retracted 16 articles in the preceding year that had been generated by the computer program SCIgen, as well as a further paper for plagiarism, although it was not stated whether these cases were related to the suspension.
