= Enzyme memory =

Enzyme mechanisms showing memory effects

Enzyme memory is a concept in enzyme kinetics based on the idea that the kinetic properties of an enzyme may vary according to conditions in its previous catalytic cycle. It can occur both in ternary-complex mechanisms and in substituted-enzyme ("ping-pong") mechanisms, with very different consequences.

== Ternary-complex mechanism ==
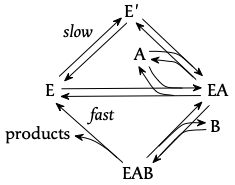
Mnemonical model of a ternary-complex enzyme mechanism

A mnemonical mechanism for a reaction A + B → products that proceeds through a ternary complex EAB is shown in the illustration at the right. The essential characteristic, that makes this different from any mechanism in which substrate binding is at or close to equilibrium, is that it contains both slow and fast steps, with the fast step preventing the binding from reaching equilibrium, because release of products is too rapid to allow this. The enzyme exists in two forms: as a free enzyme it exists as E′, but the form released at the end of the catalytic cycle is E.

E′ is the form that exists during the catalytic reaction at low concentrations of the first substrate A, because substrate binding is too slow to prevent equilibration between the two forms of free enzyme. However, at high concentrations of A, EA is formed much more rapidly, and can be swept away too fast to allow E′ to be produced. In consequence the kinetic behaviour can vary with the substrate concentration, and deviations from Michaelis–Menten kinetics can result — negative cooperativity in the case of wheat-germ hexokinase, the enzyme for which the model was proposed, and positive cooperativity for liver hexokinase D.

However, the mnemonical model is not the only possible explanation of such behaviour, and other authors have preferred a slow-transition mechanism for similar experimental data. The differences in predictions made by these two models are very small, making it difficult or impossible to distinguish between them.

The idea that kinetic mechanisms could lead to properties that would be impossible for processes at equilibrium, such as cooperativity in monomeric enzymes originated in a suggestion that the kinetic behaviour of phosphofructokinase could be explained by a non-equilibrium mechanism in which the two substrates could bind in either order and a more general suggestion of how kinetic cooperativity could arise in a one-substrate reaction. However, the absence of any experimental cases that seemed to require such models resulted in their being regarded as theoretical hypotheses rather than as practical mechanisms until the development of the mnemonical model.

== Substituted-enzyme mechanism ==
A substituted-enzyme mechanism consists of two half reactions. In the first a group G in a substrate AG is transferred to the enzyme E, which becomes EG (the "substituted enzyme"):

E + AG → EG + A

In the second half reaction the group G is transferred to the second substrate B, producing BG and regenerating the free enzyme E:

EG + B → E + BG

The complete reaction is thus

AG + B → A + BG

with E left unchanged. As the substituted enzyme EG is expected to be exactly the same regardless of which possible substrate, out of several possibilities AG, A′G, A′′G etc., donated G. One would expect, therefore, that the kinetics with respect to B would be the same regardless of the identity of AG. That is not, however, what was observed with rhodanese, or with ascorbate oxidase and aspartate aminotransferase. The reaction catalysed by ascorbate oxidase follows a triple-displacement mechanism, with two different substituted-enzyme forms, but it follows the same principles of enzyme memory.

Jarabak and Westley interpreted the results of these experiments to mean that in the first half reaction the substrate left an "imprint" on the enzyme that caused it to "remember" what it had been exposed to in the first half reaction. Subsequently, similar effects have been observed with other enzymes, such nitrate reductase from E. coli.
