= John Westley (biochemist) =

American enzymologist

- Born: 1927
- Education: University of Chicago (Ph.D. 1954)
- Known for: Studies of enzyme kinetics, especially of sulfurtransferases
- Scientific career
- Fields: Biochemistry
- Workplaces: University of Chicago
- Thesis: Studies on the synthesis of histidine by Escherichia coli (1954)

Notes
- A photograph may be found at https://photoarchive.lib.uchicago.edu/db.xqy?one=apf1-13257.xml, but cannot be displayed here on account of copyright restrictions

John W. Westley (1927–) was an American enzymologist at the University of Chicago, best known for his research on rhodanese and other sulfurtransferases.

== Education and employment ==
John Westley obtained his Ph.D. in 1954 at the University of Chicago on the basis of a thesis entitled "Studies on the synthesis of histidine by Escherichia coli". He subsequently worked in the Department of Biochemistry (now Department of Biochemistry & Molecular Biology) of the University of Chicago.

== Research ==
John Westley's doctoral research concerned the biosynthesis of histidine in Escherichia coli. Subsequently he became an enzymologist and worked principally on rhodanese (thiosulfate sulfurtransferase, EC 2.8.1.1), starting with a comparison of the enzyme forms isolated from beef liver and kidney and purification of the kidney enzyme.

He continued to study the kinetic behaviour of the liver enzyme, and was probably the first to study memory effects in substituted-enzyme ("ping-pong") mechanisms. Memory effects are also possible in ternary-complex mechanisms, as in the "mnemonical model" used by Ricard and co-workers to explain the deviations from linear kinetics observed in wheat-germ hexokinase. However, the kinetic effects are completely different. The memory effects discussed by Katz and Westley, do not generate departures from linear kinetics but instead allow an enzyme to "remember" which of various alternative substrates it handled in the previous catalytic cycle and modify its kinetic properties accordingly. In addition to specific reports on sulfurtransferases he wrotre a review on these enzymes.

Westley was also concerned with more general aspects of enzyme kinetics, such as uncompetitive inhibition in metabolic systems, metabolite channelling, and rapid-equilibrium mechanisms, and regulation.

== Enzymic catalysis ==
In addition to his research publications, Westley is also known for his book Enzymic catalysis, which in its time was an important textbook on the subject.
