= Nick Hoogenraad =

Australian biochemist

- Born: Nicolaas Johannes Hoogenraad; The Hague, Netherlands
- Education: University of Melbourne
- Children: 2
- Awards: ASBMB Lemberg Medal; AMRAD/Pharmacia Biotechnology Medal; Leach Protein Chemistry Medal; Officer of the Order of Australia
- Scientific career
- Fields: Agricultural biochemistry Medical biochemistry Mitochondrial biochemistry
- Workplaces: University of Melbourne; Stanford University; La Trobe University
- Thesis: Studies on the Contribution of Rumen Bacteria to the Nutritional Requirements of Sheep (1969)
- Doctoral advisor: Frank Hird
- Website: https://scholars.latrobe.edu.au/njhoogenraad

Nick Hoogenraad, AO is an Australian biochemist. He is currently Emeritus Professor of Biochemistry at La Trobe University. Hoogenraad's work led to the discovery of the mitochondrial unfolded protein response.

Hoogenraad was born in The Hague to Ton and Lique Hoogenraad, and was one of six children. Hoogenraad completed a bachelor of agricultural science, by the end of which time he had "fallen in love with biochemistry", partly due to reading The Origin of Life by Soviet biochemist Alexander Oparin. He completed his Ph.D. under agricultural biochemist Frank Hird, using biochemical and electron microscopy techniques to compile the first atlas of the bacteria in the rumen of sheep. Working with the rumen bacteria was unpleasant and another member of Hird's lab, Max Marginson, started calling Hoogenraad "rumencrud" in allusion to this. This behaviour stopped after Hoogenraad placed some foul-smelling butyric acid on Marginson's jacket.

He began work as a postdoctoral researcher in the Pediatric department at Stanford University in 1969, becoming assistant professor in Human Biology in 1971, and returning for a year as visiting professor in 1979. He returned to Australia in 1974 after being hired by Bruce Stone to join the new department of Biochemistry at La Trobe University. He became Head of Biochemistry when Stone retired in 1993. In 1998 he was appointed Head of the School of Molecular Sciences which was restructured multiple times, and by his retirement in 2014 contained three departments: Biochemistry and Genetics, Chemistry and Physics, and Pharmacy and Applied Science. Hoogenraad also served as the founding director of the La Trobe Institute for Molecular Science from 2009 to 2014. An auditorium in the LIMS1 building is named after him.

His most recent research interest is cachexia. In 2015 his team published research showing how mice that do not have the receptor for a protein called Fn14 do not develop cachexia in cancer. Mice treated with anti-Fn14 antibodies also do not develop cachexia.
