= Richard Amasino =

American geneticist (born 1956)

Prof Richard M. Amasino
- Born: 1956
- Citizenship: United States
- Education: Pennsylvania State University, Indiana University Bloomington
- Scientific career
- Workplaces: University of Wisconsin–Madison
- Thesis: Control of tobacco crown gall tumor morphology (1982)
- Doctoral advisor: Carlos O. Miller
- Doctoral students: Robert J. Schmitz

Richard Amasino is a professor of biochemistry and genetics at the University of Wisconsin–Madison. He got his bachelor's degree in biology at Pennsylvania State University. He went on to receive his PhD in biochemistry at Indiana University Bloomington in 1982 and did post doctoral research at the University of Washington. Amasino's research focuses on plants and how plants know when to flower. In 2006 he was elected to the National Academy of Sciences.

Amasino’s research has focused on how plants know when to flower after exposure to winter, a process called vernalization. Amasino discovered that annual and biennial Brassicaceae—and in particular Arabidopsis thaliana—will only flower after prolonged cold treatment by shutting off a gene called Flowering Locus C (FLC). Recently, his work has centered on vernalization responses in temperate grasses using Brachypodium distachyon.

== Honors and awards ==
- 2018 Carlos O. Miller Professor of Biochemistry
- 2013 Hilldale Professorship
- 2011 American Association for the Advancement of Science Fellow
- 2009 Elected Fellow of the American Society of Plant Biologists
- 2008 Hildale Professorship
- 2006 Elected to the U.S. National Academy of Sciences
- 2006 Howard Hughes Medical Institute Teaching Professor
- 2003 Wisconsin Distinguished Professor Biochemistry, UW-Madison
- 1989-1994 Presidential Young Investigator Award, National Science Foundation
- 1986 McKnight Foundation Individual Research Award in Plant Biology
