= Gösta Pettersson (biochemist) =

Biochemist from Sweden

- Born: 24 November 1937 (age 87); Varberg, Halland County, Sweden
- Education: Lund University (Ph.D. 1966)
- Known for: Alcohol dehydrogenase
- Children: Ulf Ryde-Pettersson
- Scientific career
- Fields: Biochemistry (especially kinetics)
- Institutions: Lund University, Sweden
- Thesis: Studies on the biosynthesis of fungal toluquinones (1966)

Gösta Pettersson is an emeritus professor in biochemistry at Lund University, Sweden. He was born in 1937 in Varberg, Sweden. He gained his Ph.D. at Lund University in 1966 on the basis of a thesis on toluquinones (natural products), and his early research was mainly concerned with fumigatin and other products of fungal metabolism.

The turning point in Pettersson's career came in the wake of a kinetic study of an enzyme from Aspergillus fumigatus. This paper has had virtually no influence on the progress of biochemistry, having never been cited in half a century except for once by its author, but it marked the beginning of the work on enzymes and kinetics for which Pettersson is best known.

== Alcohol dehydrogenase ==
The major experimental focus of Pettersson's work on the kinetics of enzyme-catalysed reactions was the enzyme alcohol dehydrogenase, principally the enzyme from horse liver, but to some degree from other sources, such as the insect Drosophila melanogaster. His work in this area concerned both "classical" steady-state kinetics, such as pH-dependence, as well as study of transients in the mechanism. In recognition of his contributions to the study of alcohol dehydrogenase Pettersson was invited to write a review on the topic in collaboration with Judith Klinman.

== Analysis of enzyme kinetic data ==
In parallel with his study of alcohol dehydrogenase, Pettersson developed methods in enzyme kinetics based on mathematical modelling and valid statistical analysis. On the basis of this expertise he has written a text book (in Swedish) on enzyme kinetics.

In a number of papers Pettersson argued against the interpretations of their kinetic data proposed by other authors, in relation for example to wheat-germ hexokinase and hexokinase from rat liver.

== Multienzyme systems ==
Pettersson developed mathematical models of multi-enzyme systems, most notably the Calvin cycle, and he entered into the controversy over whether direct transfer of the product of an enzyme-catalysed reaction to an enzyme of which it is the substrate (metabolite channelling) is a real phenomenon adequately supported by the experimental results claimed to demonstrate it.

== Global warming ==
After retirement, Pettersson has studied the question of global warming and has published a critical book against alarmists, in which the greenhouse effect is critically discussed from a scientific and kinetic perspective.
