= Biochemist =

Scientist specialized in biochemistry

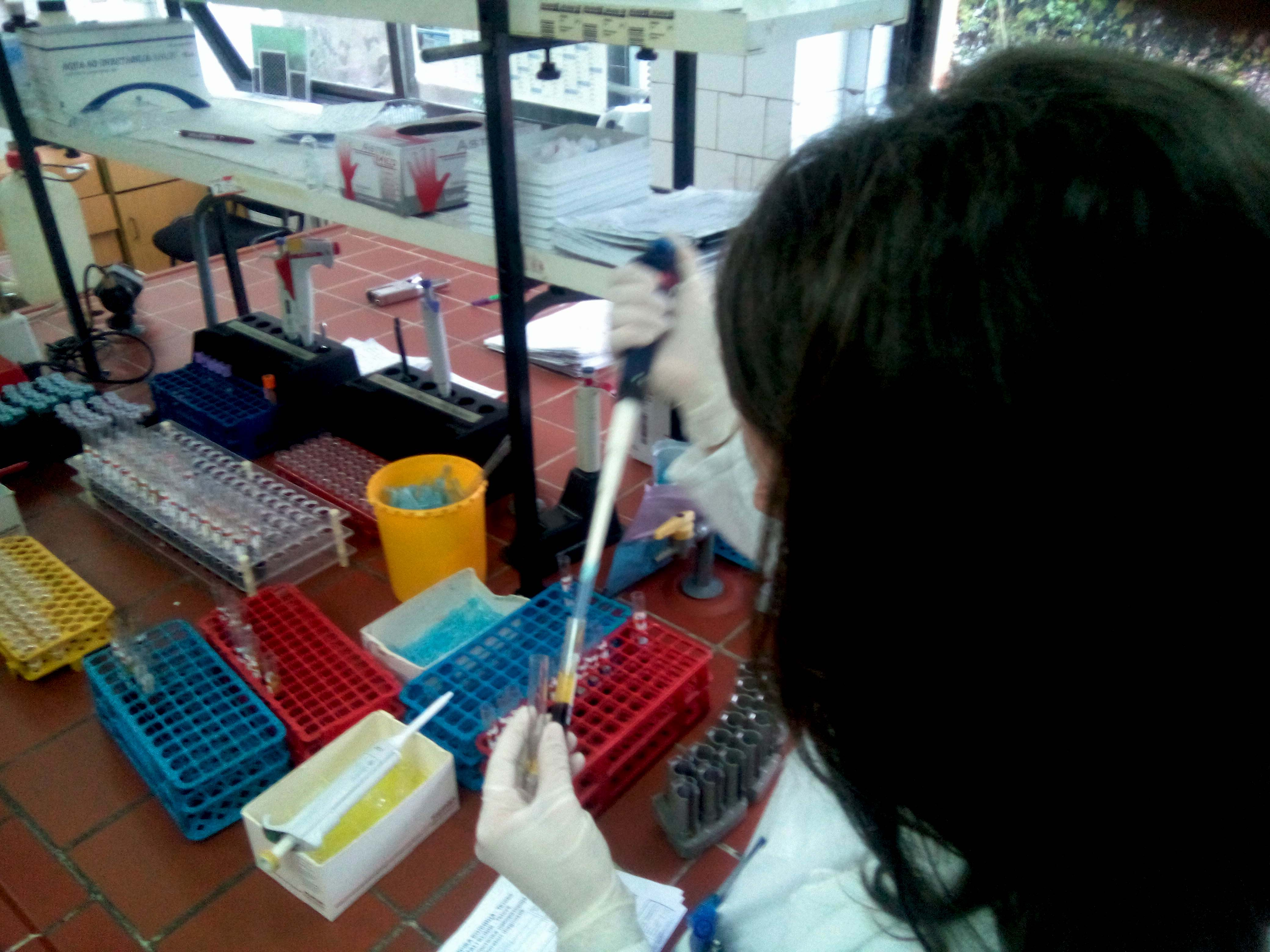
Biochemist working in biochemical laboratory

Biochemists or biological chemists are scientists who are trained in biochemistry. They study chemical processes and chemical transformations in living organisms. Biochemists study DNA, proteins and cell parts.

Biochemists also research how certain chemical reactions happen in cells and tissues and observe and record the effects of products in food additives and medicines.

Biochemist researchers focus on planning and constructing research experiments, mainly for developing new products, updating existing products and analyzing said products. It is also the responsibility of a biochemist to present their research findings and create grant proposals to obtain funds for future research.

Biochemists study aspects of the immune system, the expressions of genes, isolating, analyzing, and synthesizing different products, mutations that lead to cancers, and manage laboratory teams and monitor laboratory work. Biochemists also have to have the capabilities of designing and building laboratory equipment and devise new methods of producing correct results for products.

The most common industry role is the development of biochemical products and processes. Identifying substances' chemical and physical properties in biological systems is of great importance, and can be carried out by doing various types of analysis. Biochemists must also prepare technical reports after collecting, analyzing and summarizing the information and trends found.

In biochemistry, researchers often break down complicated biological systems into their component parts. They study the effects of foods, drugs, allergens and other substances on living tissues; they research molecular biology, the study of life at the molecular level and the study of genes and gene expression; and they study chemical reactions in metabolism, growth, reproduction, and heredity, and apply techniques drawn from biotechnology and genetic engineering to help them in their research. About 75% work in either basic or applied research; those in applied research take basic research and employ it for the benefit of medicine, agriculture, veterinary science, environmental science, and manufacturing. Each of these fields allows specialization; for example, clinical biochemists can work in hospital laboratories to understand and treat diseases, and industrial biochemists can be involved in analytical research work, such as checking the purity of food and beverages.

Biochemists in the field of agriculture research the interactions between herbicides with plants. They examine the relationships of compounds, determining their ability to inhibit growth, and evaluate the toxicological effects surrounding life.

Biochemists also prepare pharmaceutical compounds for commercial distribution.

Modern biochemistry is considered a sub-discipline of the biological sciences, due to its increased reliance on, and training, in accord with modern molecular biology. Historically, even before the term biochemist was formally recognized, initial studies were performed by those trained in basic chemistry, but also by those trained as physicians.

== Training ==
Some of the job skills and abilities that one needs to attain to be successful in this field of work include science, mathematics, reading comprehension, writing, and critical thinking. These skills are critical because of the nature of the experimental techniques of the occupation. One will also need to convey trends found in research in written and oral forms.

A degree in biochemistry or a related science such as chemistry is the minimum requirement for any work in this field. This is sufficient for a position as a technical assistant in industry or in academic settings. A Ph.D. (or equivalent) is generally required to pursue or direct independent research. To advance further in commercial environments, one may need to acquire skills in management.

Biochemists must pass a qualifying exam or a preliminary exam to continue their studies when receiving a Ph.D. in biochemistry.

Biochemistry requires an understanding of organic and inorganic chemistry. All types of chemistry are required, with emphasis on biochemistry, organic chemistry and physical chemistry. Basic classes in biology, including microbiology, molecular biology, molecular genetics, cell biology, and genomics, are focused on. Some instruction in experimental techniques and quantification is also part of most curricula.

In the private industries for businesses, it is imperative to possess strong business management skills as well as communication skills. Biochemists must also be familiar with regulatory rules and management techniques.

Due to the reliance on most principles of the basic science of Biochemistry, early contemporary physicians were informally qualified to perform research on their own in mainly this (today also related biomedical sciences) field.

== Employment ==
Biochemists are typically employed in the life sciences, where they work in the pharmaceutical or biotechnology industry in a research role. They are also employed in academic institutes, where in addition to pursuing their research, they may also be involved with teaching undergraduates, training graduate students, and collaborating with post-doctoral fellows.

Because of a biochemists' background in both biology and chemistry, they may also be employed in the medical, industrial, governmental, and environmental fields. Slightly more than half of the biological scientists are employed by the Federal State and local governments. The field of medicine includes nutrition, genetics, biophysics, and pharmacology; industry includes beverage and food technology, toxicology, and vaccine production; while the governmental and environmental fields includes forensic science, wildlife management, marine biology, and viticulture.

The average income of a biochemist was $82,150 in 2017. The range of the salaries begin around 44,640 to 153,810, reported in 2017. The United States Federal Government in 2005 reported the average salaries in different fields associated with biochemistry and being a biochemist. General biological scientists in nonsupervisory, supervisory, and managerial positions earned an average salary of $69,908; microbiologists, $80,798; ecologists, $72,021; physiologists, $93,208; geneticists, $85,170; zoologists, $101,601; and botanists, $62,207.

== See also ==
- List of biochemists
