= Victor James =

Australian Unitarian minister (1897–1984)

Rev. Victor Montgomery Keeling James (19 March 1897 – 1984) was a Unitarian minister in Melbourne, Victoria from 1947 to 1969. He was the target of right-wing hostility in the 1950s and 1960s due to his activities in the peace movement and links to Communist China.

== Background ==
The Melbourne Unitarian Church was founded in 1852 as the Unitarian Christian Church, a conventional anti-Trinitarian church with the Bible as its foundation. (Note: Melbourne Unitarian Christian Church held its first services at the Mechanics' Institute in January 1853. Its first chapel, on Grey Street, Eastern Hill, was registered as a church in November 1854, rebuilt in 1864, and a new church on Grey Street opened in 1887. Grey Street West was renamed Cathedral Place (for the nearby Catholic cathedral) in 1940.)

Its services and sacraments were similar to those of regular Protestant churches, including Holy Communion, but substituted reason for dogma, so little credence was given to heaven, hell and reincarnation, original sin, Virgin Birth, Resurrection and Redemption. Their claim to be Christian was denied by most other church leaders. Members of the congregation were predominately of British extraction, and generally thoughtful, educated, cultured, civic-minded and prosperous. In the latter half of the 19th century they generally supported the causes of women's suffrage and Aboriginal rights, and opposed the Boer War and exploitation of Kanaka labour.

William Bottomley (1882–1966) was born in Wharfedale, Yorkshire, son of a Wesleyan lay preacher who died when Bottomley was 16 years old. He, also, was a preacher before becoming a Unitarian and paid propagandist for the Independent Labour Party. He came to Melbourne from Somerset in April 1926, succeeding Rev. J. T. Hustow as minister of the Melbourne church on Grey Street, Eastern Hill. An adjacent manse was completed for the minister's family the following August. He was soon involved in social reform causes, working for reform of the divorce laws. He was known as a pacifist, a cause which was gaining ground following the jingoism of the First World War, in which he served. He briefly entered politics as a candidate against Harold Holt for the Federal seat of Fawkner in 1937 and opposed participation in WWII. He was a popular and energetic minister, attracting a large following to the church, including university students to its Young People's Society. He participated at the opening of the new Sydney Unitarian Church in 1940, taking the pulpit on its first Sunday. He was involved with the Workers' Educational Association and the University Extension Board. He gave thoughtful and entertaining talks on ABC radio. He conducted a popular program, "The Unitarian Half-hour" weekly on radio 3XY, which ran from 1943 or earlier. He published a monthly magazine, The Beacon from the mid-40s, which would survive to 1956. He attracted guest speakers ranging from the conservative Wilfrid Kent Hughes to Maurice Blackburn. Zelman Cowan was a regular before he became a national figure and O. R. Snowball used the pulpit in his push for divorce reform. Bernard O'Dowd and Marie Pitt were active members. The vibrant intellectual atmosphere and freedom of the church also attracted a number of "free spirits" and "oddball" individualists.

== History ==
Victor James was born in Pontypool, Wales, son of a dentist, druggist and Calvinist Methodist lay preacher, but strongly influenced by his neighbour, a shoemaker and student of Darwinian evolution, who encouraged him to question Biblical authority. Following demobilisation in 1918 he trained as a dentist, with a practice in Ilminster, Somerset, and by 1922 was married and living in Taunton, where he heard Bottomley preaching and so became a regular attendee and occasional lay preacher of Taunton Unitarian Chapel on Mary Street. (Note: Misreported in the Scott book as "St Mary's Unitarian church", surely an oxymoron) He began preaching at nearby Yeovil, which had lost its regular minister and was in danger of closing. He abandoned dentistry to study externally for the Unitarian ministry, a four-year course at Manchester College, Oxford; he then returned to South Wales, where he became minister of the Unitarian churches of Aberdare and Mountain Ash nearby.

Bottomley came out of his service in the First World War disillusioned but not an absolute pacifist. He was not enamored of the anti-religious and undemocratic nature of Communism. He championed workers' rights but not absolutely — he spoke against the miners' strike of 1949.

James had not only served in that conflict but, due to his longstanding antipathy to Fascism, served also in WWII as instructor with rank of company commander in the Welsh Regiment, followed by an RAF regiment (5358 Airfield Company) as squadron leader in China. He then served as Provost Marshal at Kowloon, accompanied by his wife, in the years 1945–1946. He was not as religious as Bottomley, being more humanist, perhaps agnostic.

=== Melbourne church ===
James was invited by Bottomley to take the position of assistant minister of the Melbourne church. He arrived by the Orion with his wife and four children on 3 July 1947. He became publicly involved in freedom of speech and anti-war movements (see below), generally perceived as Communist-inspired. Though he was at pains to point out that his participation was from personal conviction and not on behalf of his congregation, it drew unwelcome attention to the church, which in 1949 split along political lines.

There had also been allegations that Bottomley had been overly familiar with one female member of the congregation (though no suggestion of immorality was made) culminating in an effusive Christmas card, recovered by James from a wastebasket. This was used as further ammunition by James, who was in the process of suing Bottomley for libel. A meeting of the congregation, though "stacked" with friends of Bottomley, found against him, and he resigned rather than accept their verdict. Bottomley and his followers founded the Unitarian Fellowship of Australia, which held its first meeting on 7 March 1950 at the Lecture Hall, 25 Russell Street, Melbourne, and founded the monthly magazine Quest.

James conducted "The Unitarian Half-hour" from 1947 or earlier to 1964. In 1952 James invited Stephen Fritchman, (Note: Stephen Hole Fritchman (1902–1981), born into a Quaker family, was appointed minister to the Petersham, Massachusetts Unitarian Church in 1930 and editor of The Christian Register in 1942, transforming the conservative AUA journal into a bright, controversial magazine. He came under fire from the US State Department when he refused under oath to name Communists in his congregation to the House Committee.) pacifist and minister of the First Unitarian Church of Los Angeles to address the congregation on the occasion of its 100th anniversary service. He was also to have toured other States, sponsored by the Australian churches, but his application for a passport was refused by the US State Department.

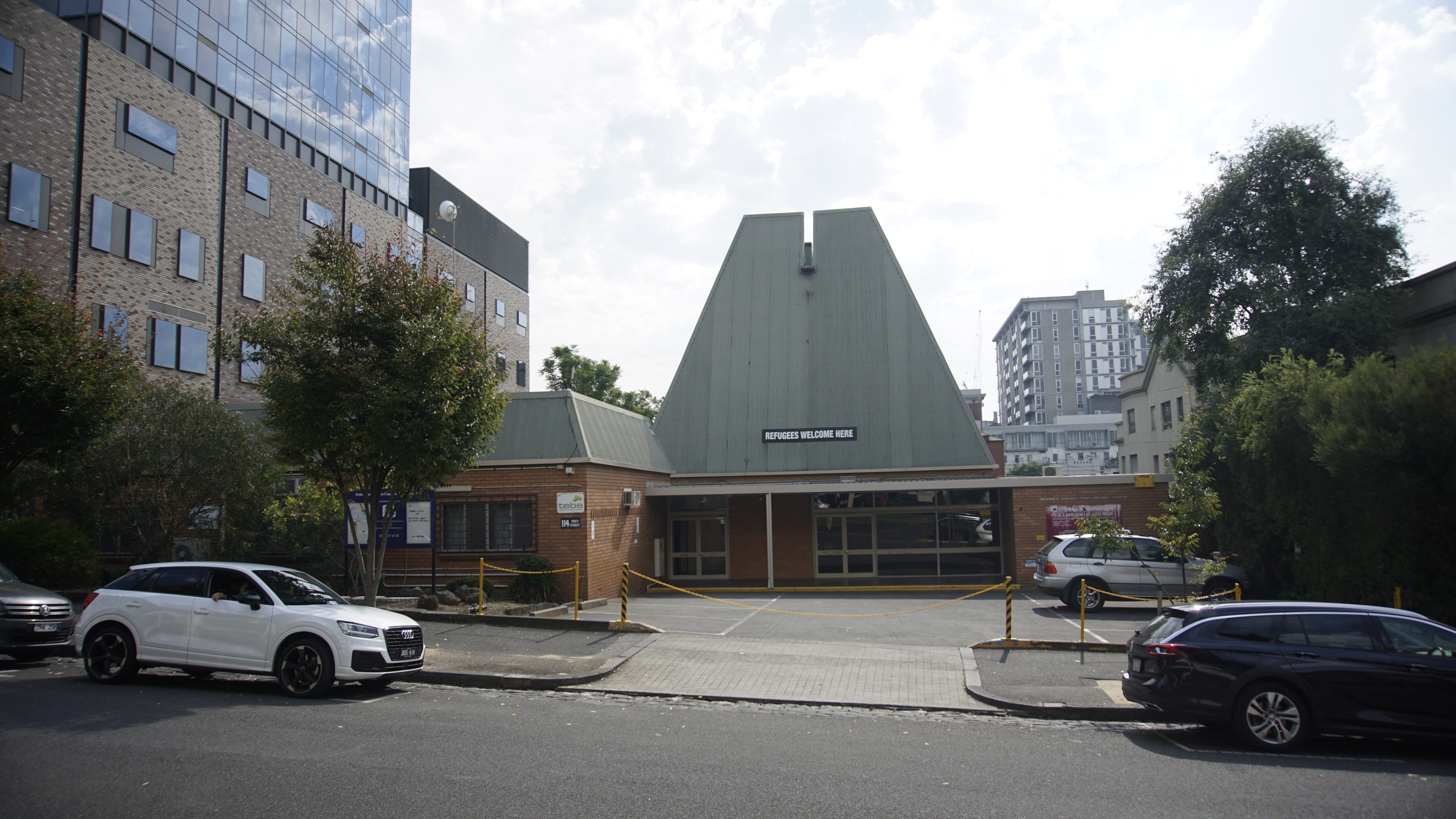
Peace Memorial Unitarian Church, Melbourne

With the smaller congregation and departure of its more generous supporters, maintenance of the old building in Cathedral Place became insupportable, and in 1964 James's congregation built the Melbourne Unitarian Peace Memorial Church at 110 Grey Street, East Melbourne, 37.8112°S 144.9849°E opposite Mercy Hospital.

James left the ministry in 1969 and was succeeded in 1972 by Terrence (Note: Spelled "Terence" in the Scott book) Stokes, previously known for his involvement with the Victorian branch of the Society of Organists.

=== Activist ===
Perhaps his first foray into public activism was in 1949, when he was one of 23 clergy who signed a public letter of protest against the proposal of a large section of city councillors to ban one John Rodgers, director of Australia-Soviet House, from holding a meeting in the Melbourne Town Hall, and efforts by the RSL to disrupt such events.

The Democratic Rights Council was founded in Sydney, 1935, by the Labour Council, which had come under attack as a pro-communist body. James was a member when he and a handful of others, in September 1949 following a successful peace rally, founded the Australian Peace Council (APC). Charter members included Doris Blackburn MHR, Leonard Mann, Frank Dalby Davison, Eleanor Dark, William Hatfield, Canon W. G. Thomas (secretary of Anglican Board of Missions), Jessie Street, Dr. Eric Dark, Dr. R. C. Traill, F. J. Waters (President of the Queensland Legion of Ex-Servicemen), J. W. Legge M.Sc., of Melbourne University.

A major preoccupation of the Australian Government in 1950 was the Communist Party Dissolution Bill, which would make the Australian Communist Party, and party membership, illegal. In June James spoke against the Bill and he, the Methodist Rev. F. J. Hartley, and the Presbyterian Rev. A. M. Dickie, all signatories to the Town Hall letter, founded the Democratic Rights Council in response. Dubbed the "peace parsons", they had also been involved in the formation of the APC. James was elected secretary of the organization, which despite being derided as Communist fellow-travellers, by June 1950 had 107,000 members. James's other activities include:

- President of the East-West Committee for Friendship with Asia
- Founder, Peace Quest Forum in Victoria
- Member of the Executive of the Peace Liaison Committee for Asian and Pacific Regions and leader of a committee opposed to re-arming Japan.
- He criticised the government's refusal to issue passports to 23 men, including Jim Healy, (Federal Secretary of WWF and leader of workers who attempted to block export of pig-iron to Japan in 1939) invited to attend Asian and Pacific Peace Conference.

== Travels ==
- He led the Australian delegation to the Peking Peace Conference in September 1952. He travelled on his British passport, whereas those with Australian passports were blocked from leaving, an action supported by the Labor opposition. It may be that only three Australians attended: James, Sydney carpenter and unionist Bruce Hart, and Mrs Nancy H. Lapwood, lecturer in English at Peking University. Ten New-Zealanders attended. Wilfred Burchett, journalist and author, left for China in January 1952, but is not known to have attended.
- James was a delegates to the third World Congress for Peace held in Vienna December 1952. Elizabeth Vassilieff of the Fellowship of Australian Writers and Dr Clive Sandy (another dentist, member of Democratic Rights Council and Essendon Peace Council) were elected to attend but did not leave Australia.
- With Rev. Francis John Hartley to World Peace Council disarmament conference, Helsinki in April 1956.

In none of these events was he supported by the Unitarian church.

== Other interests ==
James was an expert woodworker, specialising in fine carpentry, carving and wood turning

He had his own workshop where he built radio and electronic equipment and inculcated the ideals of fine craftsmanship in his son William, later a maker of precision optical instruments for astronomy.

== Bibliography ==
- Windows in the Years (autobiography), intro by Terrence Stokes; foreword by Phillip Adams
- this religion business [LC as titled] (1973), Beacon Publications, Melbourne. An overview of humanist religious thought, from a series of sermons delivered in July 1969.

== Family ==
James married Ida Rose Relleen (2 July 1903 – 5 July 1958) in Ilminster.

- (Mfanwy) Avril James (c. 1926 –) married Gordon Ernest Mitchell (6 June 1924 –) on 15 April 1950. Mitchell was a precision optical technician.
- Thelma James (24 March 1928 – 2016) married James Park (10 December 1921 –), a Scottish carpenter, (VPF 11188)
- William Edwin James (6 March 1931 – May 1995) noted maker of instruments for optical astronomy VPF 4518
- David Reeleen James (1 September 1932 –)

Later address was 124 Glenfern Road, Lysterfield

== Further resources ==
- The University of Melbourne holds an extensive collection of Victor James ephemera in their archives.
- Australian Archives has much of ASIO's extensive file on him (Series A6119; control symbols 2175–2178) names of agents and informants have been blacked out and some reports have been withheld according to one or more of these "exemption criteria":

- 33(1)(a) - would damage Australia's security, defence or international relations;
- 33(1)(d) - would be a breach of confidence;
- 33(1)(e)(ii) - would, or could reasonably be expected to disclose the existence or identity of a confidential source of information, including a person providing confidential information to the National Crime Authority or the Australian Federal Police or a witness under the Witness Protection Act 1994;
- 33(1)(g) - would unreasonably disclose information about the personal affairs of a person;
The records are in four volumes:
- Vol. I 1949–57
- Vol. II 1956–63
- Vol. III 1963–65
- Vol. IV 1966

== Postscript ==
Hartley and Dickie were awarded the 1965 Joliot-Curie gold medal by the World Peace Council. The reference does not mention James.
