= Vassilieff =

Vassilieff is a surname. Notable people with the surname include:

- Danila Vassilieff (1897–1958), Russian-born Australian painter
- Elizabeth Vassilieff (1915–2007), Australian artist
- Marie Vassilieff (1884–1957), Russian-born painter
