= Carlos Leon =

Carlos Leon may refer to:

- Carlos Leon (athlete), American Paralympic shot putter
- Carlos Augusto León (1914–1997), Venezuelan poet, essayist, politician and scientist
- Carlos De León (born 1959), Puerto Rican boxer
