= F. J. Hartley =

Francis John Hartley
- Born: 11 March 1909; Rutherglen, Victoria
- Died: 5 July 1971 (aged 62); Prahran
- Resting place: Springvale (cremated)
- Education: University of Melbourne, Queen's College
- Occupation: Military chaplain (Padre)
- Known for: Methodist and peace activist
- Awards: Joliot-Curie gold medal (1965)
- Honours: Mentioned in dispatches

Rev. Francis John "Frank" Hartley (11 March 1909 – 5 July 1971) was an Australian Methodist minister who served as a padre in wartime New Guinea, and became a peace activist, one of the three "peace parsons".

== History ==
=== Early life and education ===
Hartley was born in Rutherglen, Victoria to Francis Robert Hartley and Minnie Annie Theresa Hartley, née Green. He was educated at the public schools at Wonthaggi, where he came under the influence of the coal miner and trade unionist, Idris Williams (trade unionist). Around 1925, with assistance from his father, opened a mercer's shop.

He enrolled in 1930 at Otira Methodist Home Missionary Training College, then, staying at Ormond College, he studied at the Melbourne College of Divinity, from which he was awarded a Bachelor of Divinity (B.D.) in 1935. This qualification was not universally recognised, which may be why he followed up at the University of Melbourne, Queen's College, where he graduated B.A. (with Honours) in 1938. He played cricket for Queen's against Ormond in 1935 and 1937.

=== Military service ===
Hartley was stationed at Yarrawonga in 1938, Wandiligong & Bright in 1939. He served six months with the CMF in 1941 then enlisted with the army for overseas service and served 4 months as chaplain, 2/7 Cavalry Regiment, in Palestine 1941–42, then two 5-month tours of duty in 116 Australian General Hospital, New Guinea in 1942–43 and 1943–44. He was mentioned in despatches in 1943

=== Peace activist ===
His later ministry included Murrumbeena, then Oakleigh in 1946, and Newport in 1951.He came to public attention in 1950 when he, Rev. Victor James, of the Unitarian Church, and the Presbyterian Rev. A. M. Dickie, founded the Democratic Rights Council, formed to protest against mooted amendments to the Crimes Act, which would have denied access of named (in this case communist) organizations to forums of public discussion. Hartley, who was at pains to point out that his involvement was as a member of the DRC, not of the church, was elected president of the organization, which by June 1950 had 107,000 members. The three were not new to controversy — they were among the 26 clergy involved in a 1949 protest for freedom of speech when the Melbourne City Council came close to banning one John Rodgers, director of Australia-Soviet House from holding a meeting in the Melbourne Town Hall, and efforts by the RSL to disrupt such events.

Dubbed the "peace parsons" they were also involved in the founding of the Australian Peace Council, a fore-runner of the Campaign for Nuclear Disarmament, and tainted with accusations as Communist fellow-travellers.

In 1955 he was appointed superintendent of the Prahran Methodist Mission, and was involved in other practical charitable institutions, notably Meals on Wheels, Homes for the Aged, Somers Youth Camp and the Tyabb Training Farm.

He was, with Rev. Alf Dickie, a recipient of the 1965 Joliot-Curie gold medal by the World Peace Council.

He died in Prahran, Victoria and his body cremated at Springvale.

== Family ==
Hartley married Marion Hamilton Thomson Lyon on 8 April 1939. She had graduated B.D. from Ormond College with Hartley in 1935. Their children include:

- Francis Thomas Hartley (3 August 1941 – )
- son (born 19 July 1944 in Brisbane)
- Marion Naomi Hartley (born 28 March 1949)
