= Pat Mackie =

Australian trade unionist (1914–2009)

Pat Mackie (30 October 1914 – 19 November 2009) was a New Zealand miner and unionist, who gained national attention as the leader of the Mount Isa Mines Strike of 1964.

== Early life ==
Mackie was born in 1914 in New Zealand as Maurice Patrick Murphy, son of Matthew and Ellen Murphy. The birth was registered in Ohakune. He gained criminal records in a number of countries under various aliases.

The article "1964 Mount Isa Mines strike" says Mackie was New Zealand-born but a "Canadian-trained activist" and a member of the Industrial Workers of the World (the "Wobblies", who were syndicalist rather than Marxist), but gives no source for these allegations.

Eventually he moved to Australia, under a false identity carrying the name of Eugene Markie. He went to work as a miner for Mount Isa Mines in Queensland, and when he registered to work there, a comment was made to him along the lines that Eugene was a girl's name. He replied "Bill, Fred, Pat, call me what you like". "Pat it is" the man said. Mackie's pseudonym came from a misprint on his payslips when he first began work in the mines, which he attempted to have corrected. However, as the company kept producing cheques and payslips in the name of "Mackie", he ultimately adopted the name and called himself "Pat Mackie".

== Mount Isa Mines lockout ==
The dispute which led to the Mount Isa Mines Lockout of 1964 involved numerous issues of pay and conditions and lasted an unprecedented 32 weeks.

Mackie was a member of the Australian Workers' Union (AWU) and became the de facto leader of the lockout. While it was AWU policy to resolve the dispute through arbitration before the Industrial Relations Commission, he pursued direct action and insisted on an enterprise agreement with the company. As a consequence the AWU expelled him from the union, which allowed the company to terminate his employment. The dispute was prolonged by the insistence of workers that he be reinstated, a demand that was never met.

After the dispute, Mackie was banned from Mount Isa Mines, and the government unsuccessfully tried to have him deported to New Zealand.

== Media profile ==
Mackie was the subject of intense media speculation at the time of the dispute, and became an iconic figure in Australia. As he wore a baseball cap of the Boston Red Sox, and spoke with an apparent American accent, he was often portrayed as an "American gangster" and foreign communist. Mackie lived for a time on the Mineside and later lived on Buckley Avenue, Parkside near the Mount Isa State High School. He also drove a Willys Jeep. Sometimes he was accused of deliberately weakening Australia to help an invasion by communist China, and his criminal record was constantly mentioned.

Mackie successfully sued a newspaper owned by Australia media mogul Frank Packer in the early 1970s for defamation. He won damages totalling $30,000. A third was awarded for misrepresenting his criminal record, while the remainder was awarded for misrepresenting his involvement in the dispute.

== Legacy ==
Mackie's story inspired a Queensland Music Festival musical production entitled Red Cap which premiered at the Mount Isa Civic Centre on 11 July 2007.

Pat Mackie died on 19 November 2009, aged 95.

== Personal ==
He was the fourth husband of Elizabeth Vassilieff (née Sutton), whose second husband was the Russian-born Australian artist Danila Vassilieff.
