= Australian Association of Scientific Workers =

Defunct Australian science workers' organisation

The Australian Association of Scientific Workers (AASW) was formed in 1939 as a grassroots and industry-focussed alternative to the existing scientific societies. It was disbanded in 1949 as a result of political attacks in a climate of Cold War hysteria.

The association comprised a federal council as well as divisions in each of Australia's six states. Various subcommittees were set up to study various problems and provide practical solutions. One of these was the drugs subcommittee, which investigated the synthesis of drugs critical to the war effort, while the shipping routes whereby these drugs were imported were under threat. The association was also concerned with the transfer of scientific workers from wartime to peacetime projects once hostilities ceased, and encouraged debate on the social responsibility of science. The AAWS was suspected by ASIO of communist ties, resulting in at least one of its members (Sprigg) being placed under surveillance.

The federal council's records are held by the Australian National University archives.

== Members ==
- Adrien Albert, chemist (drugs subcommittee, 1939)
- Eric Ashby (later Baron Ashby), botanist
- Eric Burhop, physicist (founding member, 1939)
- Leonard Ulysses Hibbard, engineer
- J. W. Legge, biochemist (founding member)
- Alan Newton, surgeon
- Kathleen Sherrard, geologist and paleontologist (founding member, 1939)
- Reg Sprigg, geologist (secretary, 1943)
- Victor Trikojus, biochemist (founding member, chairman 1939–44, head of drugs subcommittee, 1940–1)
