= Sydney Unitarian Church =

The Sydney Unitarian Church, also known as the Hyde Park Unitarian Church began around 1850 as the Unitarian Communion or Unitarian Congregational Church, meeting in a chapel which opened in 1853 on Macquarie Street, near the Mint.

Building began on the new church on Liverpool Street, Hyde Park, in 1872, opened August 1879. The building was a special project of the Rev. Dr Pillars, but he did not live to see it opened, having died accidentally in 1875.

Services at Liverpool Street became increasingly disrupted in the early 20th-century due to vehicular traffic, and the property was offered for sale but withdrawn when the highest bid was £37,000. The congregation celebrated the building's 50-year Jubilee in the weekend of 24–25 August 1929. The building was gutted by fire on 6 November 1936. The vacant site was sold in the depths of the Great Depression, 1938, for £23,000.

A replacement building at 15 Francis Street, near College Street, was opened by Rev. Heathcote on 23 November 1940. Rev William Bottomley, from the Melbourne congregation, was involved in the ceremony.

== Ministers ==
- Dr George Heape (Note: Often misspelled "Heap") Stanley (c. 1817 – 12 March 1891), BA graduate of London University, arrived in November 1853, served as minister for 11 years. He was the first LLD graduate of Sydney University, then operated a private school.
- James Pillars (1834 – 31 July 1875) served 1864–1875. While rock-climbing with two young friends at the South Head he fell to his death; the body was washed away and never found.
- John Henry Smith (perhaps c. 1843–1925) served from 1879 to 1882. He opened the Liverpool Street church on 30 August 1879, resigned in 1882 to become headmaster of a country school, perhaps Penrith Public School, which became Henry Street Infants' School. He (if the same John Henry Smith), founded the Penrith School of Arts in 1900, retired in 1907 to live at Bondi, and died aged 82 in 1925.
- Abram Birtles Camm (died 1891) served 1882 to 1885, then returned to England, and the Banks Street church, Blackpool. He died after, presumedly, falling from a railway carriage window in the Peak Forest tunnel.
- Edward Richard Grant (c. 1838 – 20 January 1888) arrived 1885; died at the Prince Alfred Hospital from Bright's disease.
- George Walters (23 October 1853 – 16 November 1926), previously at the Melbourne Unitarian Church, served from June 1888 to 1898, when he resigned to form a breakaway congregation "The Australian Church", a creedless church similar to Charles Strong's congregation in Melbourne. Replacements were found in John Herman Leopold Zillman PhD (c. 1841 – 28 September 1919) (Note: Zillman was earlier an Anglican priest, the first appointed to the Adelong parish in the gold rush days.) and Charles Bright (c. 1831 – 17 April 1903). (Note: Bright married Pillars' widow, Annie, in 1883 He died before the reunification; she lived a further ten years, a valuable and energetic worker for the church.) The new church struggled financially and rejoined in 1903, and Walters continued to serve until November 1926, when he was accidentally killed by a motor car while alighting from a tram.
- Albert Thornhill (c. 1870 – 5 May 1938) graduate of Cambridge University and Manchester Theological College; came from Auckland in January 1929 and retired in December 1931.
- Rev. Wyndham Selfe Heathcote (1862–c. 1956), an Anglican priest, of the same "advanced modernist" school as Bishop Barnes and Dean Inge, previously of the Adelaide Unitarian Church, began preaching at the Sydney church in 1927. He was noted for defending people with unpopular views, such as Professor John Anderson, who attacked teaching of religion in schools and Dr Robert V. Storer, author of A Survey of Sexual Life in Adolescence and Marriage. Heathcote retired in 1945 but continued to take the pulpit occasionally. He died in Sydney around 1960, aged 94 years.
