= Kathleen Sherrard =

Australian geologist and paleontologist

Kathleen Margaret Maria Sherrard (15 February 1898 – 21 August 1975) was an Australian geologist and paleontologist.

== Early life and education ==
The daughter of John McInerny, a medical practitioner, and Margaratta Wright (née Brayshay), she was born Kathleen McInerny in North Carlton, Melbourne, and later lived in Beijing.

She studied geology and chemistry at university, receiving a BSc (in 1918) and MSc (in 1921) from the University of Melbourne and winning the Kernot and Caroline Kay research scholarships.

== Career ==
McInerny became a demonstrator and then assistant geography lecturer at the University of Melbourne in 1919, supporting her family after her father's death. She was honorary secretary of the Victorian Women Graduates' Association from 1920 to 1928. She spent six months in 1927 working under Professor Arthur Hutchinson at the mineralogical laboratory of the University of Cambridge, attending lectures in crystallography and mineralogy. From 1928 to 1938 she was honorary secretary of the Australian Federation of University Women.

Prior to the 1960s it was difficult for married women to find employment in Australia, and her marriage in 1928 was the end of Sherrard's paid career in geosciences. Instead, she involved herself in social causes and self-funded her education and research.

Sherrard was a member of the Royal Society of New South Wales, the Royal Society of Victoria, the Linnean Society of New South Wales and the Geological Society of Australia.

Professor Leo Cotton at the University of Sydney granted her access to the facilities in the Geology Department and from the 1950s she was considered a staff member in the department. Sherrard switched from geology to palaeontology, becoming a keen palaeontologist. She worked on refining Ordovician to Silurian graptolite zones and studying tentaculites and other invertebrates. She published 15 research papers in refereed journals between 1928 and 1975, attended domestic and international conferences and undertook fieldwork, sometimes taking her two sons with her.

In 1939, Sherrard helped establish the Australian Association of Scientific Workers. In this role she convened a sub-committee which studied the effects of nutrition on child growth and worked on problems of food storage and distribution in the event of any large scale evacuation from cities during World War II. Toward the end of World War II, Sherrard published a paper in the Australian Women's Digest, which challenged women pursuing science careers to think about their future.

In 1950 she spent three months at the University of Cambridge and the Sedgwick Museum studying under Dr Gertrude Elles, and in 1967 examined fossil collections in Peking (later Beijing).

She tried to promote an increased involvement by women in science.

== Recognition ==
Her papers were donated to the State Library of New South Wales, Mitchell and Dixson Libraries Manuscripts Collection. A species of graptolite is named for her - Monograptus sherrardae.

== Personal life ==
In 1928, she married Howard Macoun Sherrard; the couple had two sons. They moved to Sydney after their marriage.

== Death ==
Sherrard died at home in Centennial Park, Sydney in 1975, at the age of 77. She was survived by her husband and sons.
