= Rudi Lemberg =

German-Australian biochemist (1896–1975)

Rudi Lemberg FRS
- Born: Max Rudolf Lemberg; 9 October 1896
- Died: 10 April 1975 (aged 78)
- Known for: Research on porphyrins; Hematin Compounds and Bile Pigments (with J. W. Legge)
- Spouse: Hanna Lemberg
- Children: None
- Scientific career
- Institutions: University of Heidelberg, Kolling Institute of Medical Research

Max Rudolf "Rudi" Lemberg FRS FAA (19 October 1896 – 10 April 1975) was a German-Australian biochemist who specialised in porphyrin structure and function. He was a Foundation Fellow of the Australian Academy of Science (FAA).

Lemberg served in the German Army during WWI and earned an Iron Cross. He married textile artist Hanne in Breslau in 1924. The couple were involved in social work programs to improve the slums and in youth groups. The Lembergs moved to Heidelberg after their marriage, where Rudi worked at the university until 1933.

Rudi, whose family background was Jewish, fled Nazi Germany with Hanna in 1933. He was recommended for a position at the University of Cambridge, and the Lembergs moved from there to Sydney in 1935. He applied for naturalization as an Australian citizen in 1937.

He was a director of the Kolling Institute of Medical Research from 1935 to 1972, establishing a major research focus on porphyrins, structures within molecules which give the red colour to blood and the yellow colour to bile. In 1949, he and collaborator J. W. Legge published Hematin Compounds and Bile Pigments, the "high-water mark in Lemberg's scientific development and thinking".

In 1953, they built a home in North Wahroonga, called The Sanctuary.

The house was designed by fellow German refugee Hugh Buhrich in the Bauhaus style. The Lembergs joined the Quakers in 1956. In 1973 Hanna Lemberg made an embroidered wall-hanging (or tapestry) titled The Sanctuary depicting their home on a large native bush land plot. The Lembergs gave part of their property to the Religious Society of Friends (Quakers) where a meeting house was built, meetings held, and Rudi taught young friends about evolution and the spirit. Rudi died in 1975, and Hanna died in 1998. The couple had no children and left their property to the Quakers.

== Rudi Lemberg Travelling Fellowship ==
The Rudi Lemberg Travelling Fellowship offered by the academy is named in his honour.

Awardees:

- 2020 – Robert Edwards
- 2018 – Christina A. Kellogg
- 2016 – Lawrence Berliner
- 2012 – Peter Jones
- 2010 – Johann Deisenhofer
- 2008 – John F. Allen
- 2006 – Jan Vymazal
- 2004 – Gerard Dismukes
- 2002 – Petra Fromme; Richard Perham
- 2001 – D.M.J.S. Bowman
- 1999 – Vern Schramm
- 1997 – Martin Brand
- 1996 – Tim Flannery
- 1993 – Winslow Briggs
- 1992 – Edward Kosower
- 1991 – Robert Huber
- 1990 – Jerker Porath
- 1989 – Michael Rosenzweig
- 1986 – Hugo Scheer
- 1985 – Michael Rossmann
- 1984 – O.T.G. Jones
- 1983 – Jack Heslop-Harrison
- 1982 – Wolfgang Joklik
- 1981 – Emanuel Margoliash; Peter H. Raven
- 1980 – L.E. Mortenson; G.J.V. Nossal
- 1979 – Britton Chance; John Gurdon; Gunther Stent
