= Adrien Albert =

Australian chemist

- Born: 19 November 1907; Sydney, New South Wales, Australia
- Died: 29 December 1989 (aged 82); Canberra, Australia
- Education: Scots College; University of Sydney; College of the Pharmaceutical Society, University of London (Ph.D., 1937) (DSc., 1947)
- Known for: Selective Toxicity
- Awards: University Medal in Pharmaceutical Science
- Scientific career
- Fields: Medical Chemistry; Pharmacology; Toxicology
- Workplaces: University of Sydney; Wellcome Research Institution, London; John Curtin School of Medical Research, Australian National University

Signature
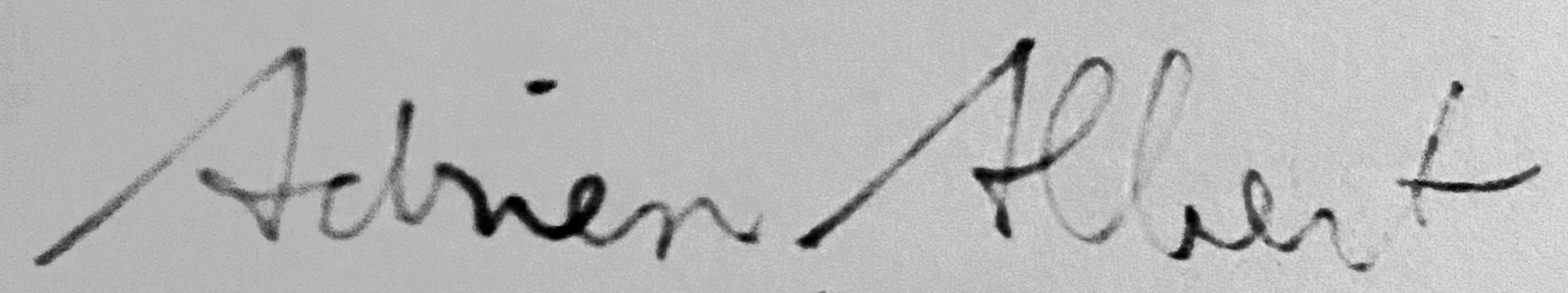

Adrien Albert AO (19 November 1907 – 29 December 1989) was a leading authority in the development of medicinal chemistry in Australia. Albert also authored many important books on chemistry, including one on selective toxicity.

== Education and appointments ==
Albert attended primary schools in Randwick and Coogee, but soon settled into the Scots College in Sydney where he excelled in both music and science. He graduated in 1924. He was expected to join the family music-publishing business and while he maintained a lifelong love of music, he was more drawn towards the sciences. At first, a compromise was reached and he studied pharmacy part-time at the University of Sydney. However he did not enjoy the work and upon becoming a registered pharmacist in 1928, he left the profession to pursue his love of science. He was awarded BSc with first class honours and the University Medal in 1932 at the University of Sydney. He gained a PhD in 1937 and a DSc in 1947 from the University of London. In 1939 he was a foundation member of the Drugs sub-committee of the Australian Association of Scientific Workers. His appointments included Lecturer at the University of Sydney (1938–1947), advisor to the Medical Directorate of the Australian Army (1942–1947), research at the Wellcome Research Institute in London (1947–1948) and in 1948 the Foundation Chair of Medical Chemistry in the John Curtin School of Medical Research at the Australian National University in Canberra where he established the Department of Medical Chemistry. Despite his prolific research output and excellent reputation as a lecturer, in 1970 the university closed the Department of Medical Chemistry and spun its activities into the Medical Chemistry Group with a more limited scope. While the prevailing trend in medical chemistry research focussed increasingly on finding new and more effective drugs, Albert had always prioritised research into the links between physico-chemical properties of drugs and their biological effects as being, in his mind, of greater overall benefit to medical chemistry than the search for new drugs. He retired in 1972.

== Scholarship ==
Albert was a scholar of heterocyclic chemistry. He authored Selective Toxicity: The Physico-Chemical Basis of Therapy, first published by Chapman & Hall in 1951. In 1960, he founded the field of economic toxicology, which is the study of the harmful effects of chemicals which are intentionally administered by humans in order to achieve a result, such as pesticides. Albert was known for his molecular approach to chemical pharmacology, which was more accepted in the USA compared to Europe at that time. Albert travelled extensively and acted as a sort of roving ambassador for Australian science.

Albert devoted his life to research: he did not like administrative work, and he only made himself available for lectures in the beginning and end parts of his academic career.

== Honors and legacy ==
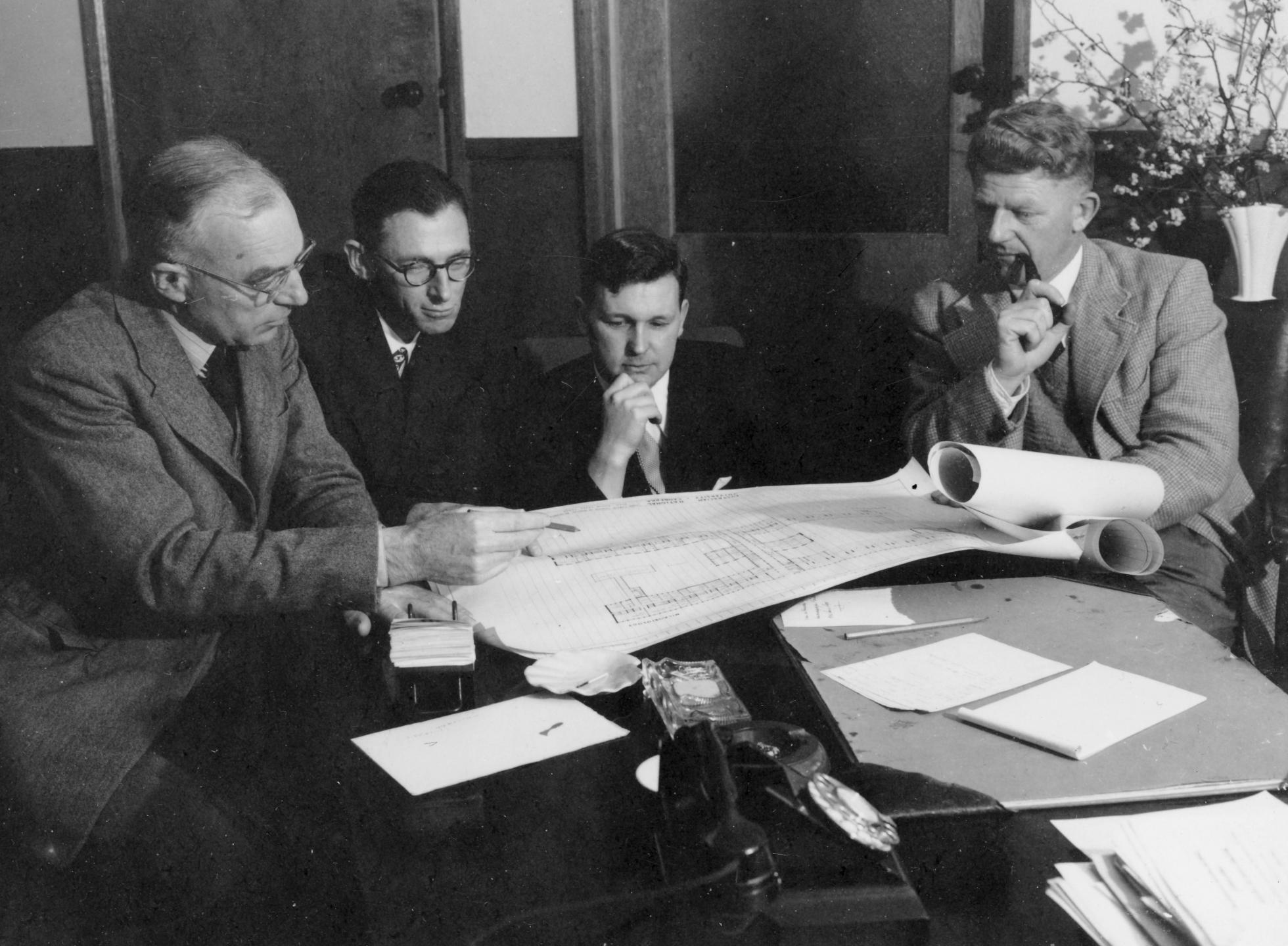
Professors John Eccles, Adrien Albert, Frank Fenner and Hugh Ennor study the plans for the proposed new John Curtin School of Medical Research

Albert was made an Officer of the Order of Australia (AO) in the 1989 Australia Day Honours for "services to medical chemistry, particularly in the fields of teaching and research". He was a Fellow of the Australian Academy of Science.

The Adrien Albert Laboratory of Medicinal Chemistry at the University of Sydney was established in his honour in 1989. His bequest funds the Adrien Albert Lectureship, awarded every two years by the Royal Society of Chemistry. The Royal Australian Chemical Institute established the Adrien Albert award in his honour.

== Personal life ==
Albert was born to Jacques Albert, a businessman in the music industry, and his third wife, Mary Eliza Blanche Allen. Albert had two much older half brothers, stemming from his father's previous marriage. After a few years, Jacques died, and so, Adrien Albert was raised by his mother and another relative.

Being tall and thin, Albert acquired the nickname "the snake" from his colleagues. It has been suggested that Albert suffered from Marfan syndrome however he was never diagnosed. Overwork and poor diet during his PhD studies in London in the mid-1930s caused a stomach ulcer to haemmorage, requiring emergency surgery. The surgery saved his life however he suffered lifelong stomach complaints as a result. Due to this ailment, he slept in every morning, but made up for time lost by working well into the night. He never married, explaining that having a family would take time away from his research. Other facets of his personality point towards a certain antipathy towards women: he drew cartoons for his friends about the dog Woofred and his wife, Ima Bitch, and he generally steered clear of female colleagues. Ironically, given his lifetime of drug research and introduction of the term selective toxicity into medical chemistry, he died of complications arising from a long-running infection of drug-resistant Staphylococcus aureus.

Fluent in French, German and Italian, Albert loved music and could play the piano very well, although he ceased to do so later in life. He enjoyed botany, particularly exotic flowers and had an extensive knowledge of native Australian plants.
