= Llanwern High School =

School in Newport, Wales

Coordinates: 51.5861°N 2.9319°W

Llanwern High School is a secondary school near Llanwern, on the eastern edge of Newport, Wales. The school has a capacity for 1450 pupils.

== History ==
Previously known as Hartridge High School, it changed its name in 2012 to Llanwern High School, recruited a new headteacher, Peter Jenkins, and built a new £29 million school building. Pupils and teachers moved into the new school in May 2012 and it was officially opened on 19 September 2012 by Wales rugby players Dan Lydiate and Toby Faletau.

== School characteristics ==
The school was profiled in The Guardian in 2006 by journalist Stephen Moss, whose own school it had been in the 1960s. Moss identifies the level of deprivation locally which means that the school "no longer gets enough pupils to produce a grammar stream". He quotes the then deputy head, "We have a small number of children who would stand their own anywhere, and we obviously nurture those, and they have as good a chance here as anywhere". Moss found the lessons "impressive" and noted that the sixth-form was a "school of sporting excellence". He describes the children as "articulate, thoughtful and a little wayward". He notes that the "school's academic performance is grisly by national standards", citing the 2006 results, but that this is misleading because of the school's catchment area and children's attainment when they come to the school.

== Inspection by Estyn ==
As of 2022, the school's most recent inspection was in 2019, with a judgement of Adequate but "in need of significant improvement". There was a monitoring visit in 2019, which found Significant Improvement.

== Notable former pupils ==
- Mark Aizlewood, Wales international football player
- John F. Allen, biochemist
- John Blackburn, Anglican priest and Chaplain General of the British Army
- Christian Malcolm, international sprinter
