= A. M. Dickie =

Australian Presbyterian minister and activist (1903–1978)

Alfred Matthew Dickie (1903–1978) was a Presbyterian minister in Victoria, Australia noted as a peace activist.

== History ==
Dickie was ordained a Presbyterian minister around 1933 and served as Moderator of the Melbourne South Presbytery in 1939. He was a co-founder, on 1 July 1949, with the Unitarian Rev. Victor James and Frank J. Hartley (Methodist), dubbed the "peace parsons" of the Australian Peace Council, a fore-runner of the Campaign for Nuclear Disarmament, and tainted with accusations as Communist fellow-travellers.

Throughout the Cold War years of the 1950s Dickie spoke out against nuclear weapons and urged Christians to work for social equality, ostensibly aims of the Soviet Union. After the disbandment of the APC, of which he was chairman, he held a similar position with the Congress for International Cooperation and Disarmament. Despite his controversial associations, which culminated in vehement opposition to Australia's involvement in the Vietnam War, he was elected Moderator of the Victorian church for the year 1965–66 and served as executive officer of the Melbourne Presbytery from 1968 to 1972.

In 1965 along with Frank Hartley he was awarded the Joliot-Curie gold medal by the World Peace Council.
