= J. W. Legge =

Australian scientist and activist

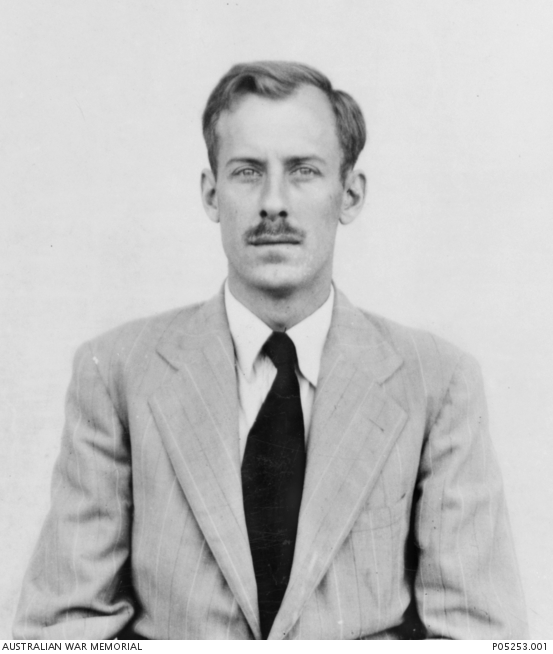
- Australian Army portrait, 1945
- Born: 3 April 1917; East Malvern, Victoria, Australia
- Died: 29 October 1996 (aged 79)
- Education: Geelong College, University of Melbourne (BSc)
- Known for: Hematin Compounds and Bile Pigments (with Rudi Lemberg)
- Children: 4
- Scientific career
- Workplaces: Kolling Institute of Medical Research, Sydney; Australian Chemical Warfare Research & Experimental Section Royal Australian Engineers; Molteno Institute, Cambridge University; University of Melbourne
- Academic advisors: Rudi Lemberg, David Keilin

John Williamson Legge, better known as Jack Legge (3 April 1917 – 29 October 1996), was an Australian biochemist and communist activist. He is best known for his work testing the effects of mustard gas on Australian troops in tropical conditions during World War II.

== Early life ==
Legge was born at 18 Beaver Street, Malvern East, Victoria, the only child of Congregationalist Rev. George Alexander Williamson Legge (1871 – 22 March 1931) and his second wife Florence Legge, née Laver. He was educated at Geelong College and the University of Melbourne, completing his BSc in absentia in 1938.

Shortly before his graduation, he moved to Sydney to work under Dr M. Rudolf "Rudi" Lemberg at the Kolling Institute of Medical Research under a grant from the National Health and Medical Research Council (NHMRC) studying blood pigment metabolism. Their research resulted in their successful book Hematin Compounds and Bile Pigments being published in 1949. As a director of the biochemical research laboratories, Lemberg appointed Legge in 1937. "Those were the days of the threat of Nazism. Legge the Marxist and Lemberg the social democrat argued through the historical antagonism of ideologies to form a united front of two. Lemberg's pleasure at finding someone who spoke the same language and Legge's respect for his intellect developed into an understanding and affection that was life-long."

== Chemical weapons research ==
As early as 1939, Legge was thinking seriously about air-raid precautions, including gas attacks on civilians. In July 1939, he became a founding member of the Australian Association of Scientific Workers. This organisation, formed as a grassroots and industry-focussed alternative to the existing scientific societies, was disbanded in 1949 as a result of political attacks founded in Cold War hysteria. From 1942 to 1946 Legge worked with the Australian Chemical Warfare Research & Experimental Section (later known as the 1st Field Trials Company, Royal Australian Engineers) on research into protective clothing and other aspects of defence against chemical warfare attacks in tropical conditions. Due to the necessity to conduct testing in tropical climates, his unit worked throughout North and Far North Queensland. Significantly, he discovered that a chemical in the standard British protective clothing reacted in tropical conditions to form aniline, a toxic chemical. Following this discovery, American protective clothing was tested and found to be suitable, though uncomfortable. This included physiological research on the effects of mustard gas trials on Australian Defence Force volunteers in Townsville, North Brook Island, Proserpine and Mission Beach. Legge and a fellow biochemist (later Prof. Sir) Hugh Ennor designed and oversaw the construction of a 100 m³ stainless steel temperature-controlled gas chamber. Legge described the work as "grisly" but necessary, because it was known that the Japanese armed forces had large stocks of this gas, and that tropical heat and humidity would render it more effective in use than it had been on the Western Front in World War I. During this time, he was recalled as recalled Jack Legge as "a slight, mild mannered man, subtle in argument and persuasive in direction". In later life he supported claims for compensation by those volunteers who suffered chronic illness that may have been a result of those trials. This included the official photographer of the project, who developed severe chronic respiratory problems owing to his occupational exposure to the gas, from which he later died. The 1989 documentary film Keen as Mustard documented these events.

== The University of Melbourne ==
Legge was granted a fellowship which enabled him to spend two years in England, working at the Molteno Institute, Cambridge University under Professor David Keilin who, in the early 1930s had been an associate of Rudi Lemberg before his departure to Sydney in 1935. He moved his family to the Melbourne suburb of Greensborough when he was hired by Victor Trikojus as a biochemistry lecturer at the University of Melbourne in 1950. About his entry into the department, Frank Hird wrote:

Jack came into the Department like a good-natured whirlwind; he was bubbling with fresh knowledge and a multitude of new ideas and immediately set about doing half a dozen things at once. The things he was doing were at the forefront of biochemistry which was to be a feature of his life in biochemistry. The mild austerity of the Department was softened by Jack's presence and the young people found him both socially and mentally attractive and always accessible.

The conservative Trikojus, department head, maintained his public support of Legge, a communist, throughout his tenure and especially before his appearance before the Petrov Royal Commission. In 1960 his area of research was the biochemistry of the hormone secretin, despite it being "outside his prime interest" which was the metabolism of bacterial and animal cells. He was described by a former student as "a brilliant man with a very agile mind", but that Legge didn't do much research, being so involved in activism for the Communist Party.

Despite earning the esteem of his colleagues, his obvious passion for teaching, and his flair for research, the highest position Legge achieved was that of senior lecturer. It has been noted that, as for other Australian communists during the cold war, Legge's political beliefs may have adversely affected his career. As one academic noted: "Jack Legge... [was] one of the very few of his academic contemporaries never to be promoted to a professorship." However, his colleague and later head of department Frank Hird recalled that Legge was prone to not finishing what he had begun, that he spent too much time trying to help others and not enough time on his own work, and that while he was well-regarded for his teaching, his undergraduate lectures were too advanced for most students. Legge retired from the university in 1981. A passionate educator, he continued to be a science communicator after his retirement, using his radio program "CR Science" on Melbourne radio station 3CR to inform the public about scientific breakthroughs in the mid-1980s. His health declined in retirement and he was incapacitated by a stroke before his death in 1996. His records are held by the State Library of Victoria.

== Politics ==
Legge joined the Communist Party of Australia (CPA) in 1935 or 1936 and helped distribute the Tribune at a time when the newspaper was banned. In 1946 he was contributing articles on science for the Tribune. He was, in September 1949, a charter member of the Australian Peace Council. On 29 October 1954, he appeared before the Royal Commission on Espionage in relation to these and other activities he carried out on behalf of the Communist party. He was extensively questioned about an alleged 1950 meeting with his cousin George Legge who worked for the Department of External Affairs in Canberra at the time. In particular, he was questioned about allegations made that his name was written in notes allegedly made by a former MVD chief named Sadovnikov. Petrov turned these notes over to the Australian Government following his defection. These notes alleged that Legge and his friend Walter Seddon Clayton, also a CPA member, had a meeting in 1950 with George Legge to ask his advice on foreign affairs so as to aid the development of the Australian Communist Party's foreign policies. George Legge told his superiors about this meeting, after which he was transferred to a minor posting, from which he resigned. Jack Legge denied the meeting had ever taken place, and denied he had been involved in espionage or any wrongdoing.

Frank Hird noted that Legge believed in science just as firmly as he believed in communism, and that these were sometimes in conflict. He gave the example of Lysenkoism, which was (until 1953) the official Soviet theory of genetics, to which all communists were supposed to adhere. Legge seemingly tried to find a middle path between evidence-based genetics and the Soviet-sponsored dogma by explaining conventional concepts in genetics to fellow communists, and by challenging his colleagues with examples of inheritance which conventional genetics could not at the time explain.

Legge wrote for the Communist Party of Australia magazine Australian Left Review, including the obituary of fellow biologist and communist J. D. Bernal, and a review of Jonathan Schell's book "The Fate Of The Earth".

== Family ==
Legge married Gertrude Avon Guiterman, a fellow member of the Communist Party of Australia, on 29 June 1940. They had four boys, including educator, author and activist John Michael Legge. Legge's papers are held at the University of Melbourne Archives. Files relating to his appearance before the Royal Commission are held at the National Archives of Australia.

== Gallery: work with the Australian Chemical Warfare Research & Experimental Section ==
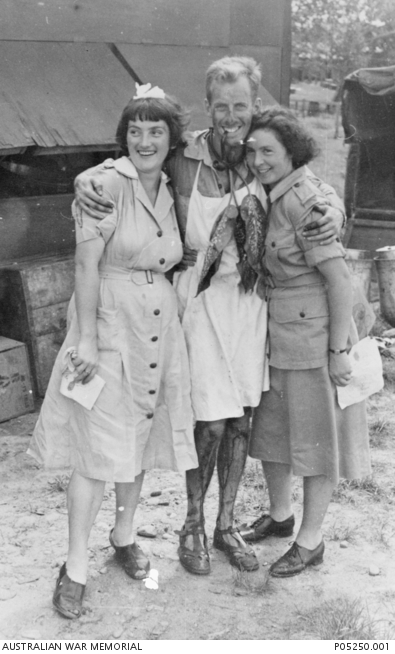
Legge with colleagues at fancy-dress party, Innisfail, 1943

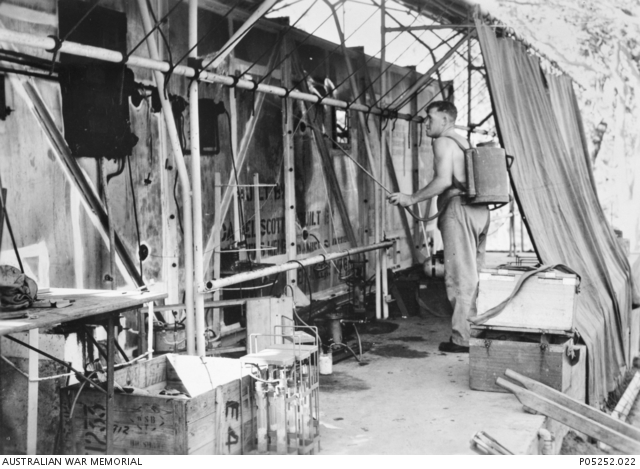
Example of gas chamber, Innisfail, 1943

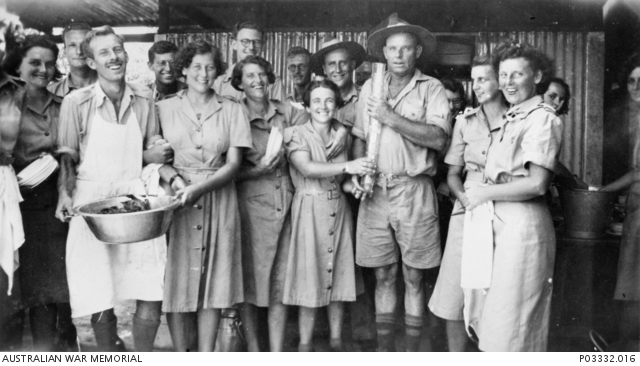
Legge (holding pot) and colleagues help clean up after Christmas dinner. Innisfail, 1943

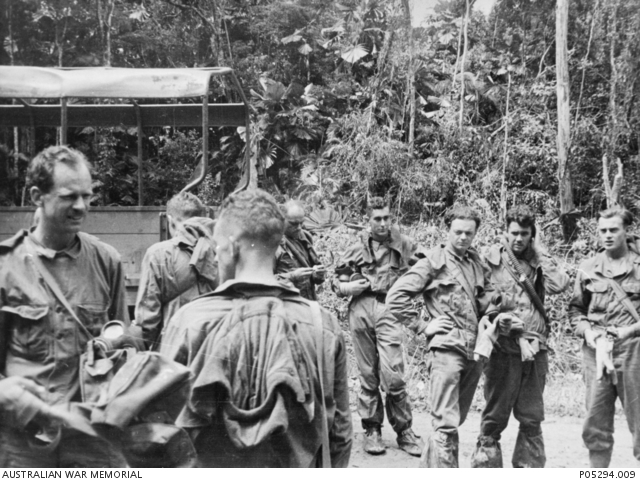
Legge briefing volunteers, North Brook Island, 1944

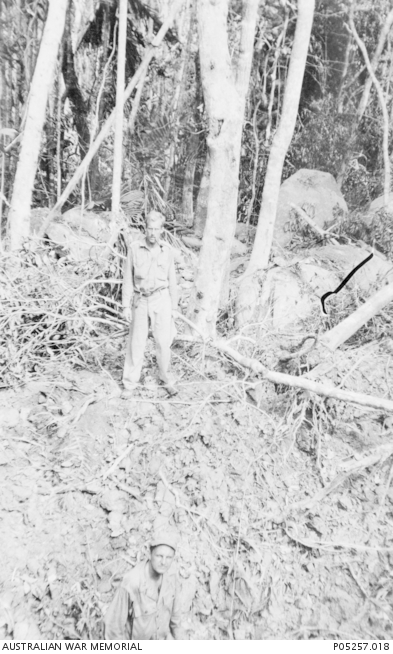
Legge stands above a bomb crater on North Brook Island, Jan 1944

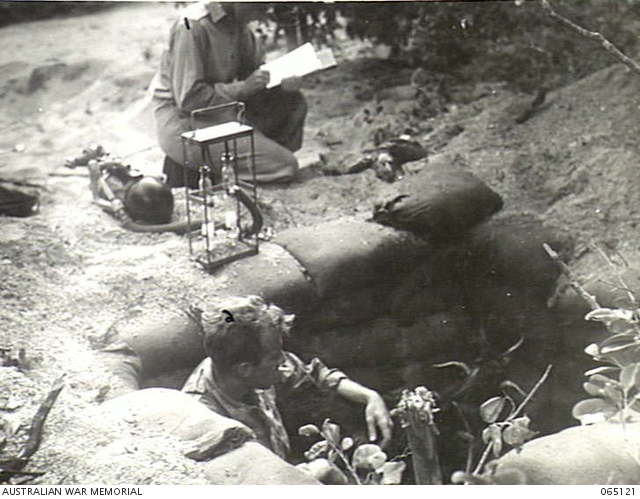
Legge & Lucas checking on goats to be used in mustard gas experiments, North Brook Island, 1944

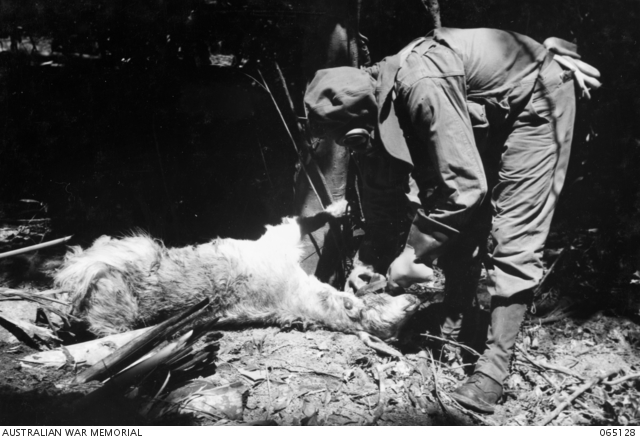
Legge conducting a post-mortem on one of the goats the next day

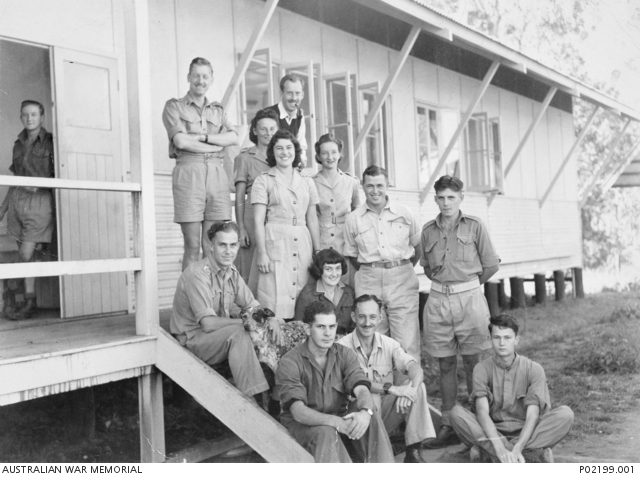
On base near Proserpine. Legge is at back right
