= John F. Allen (biochemist) =

British biochemist

John Allen
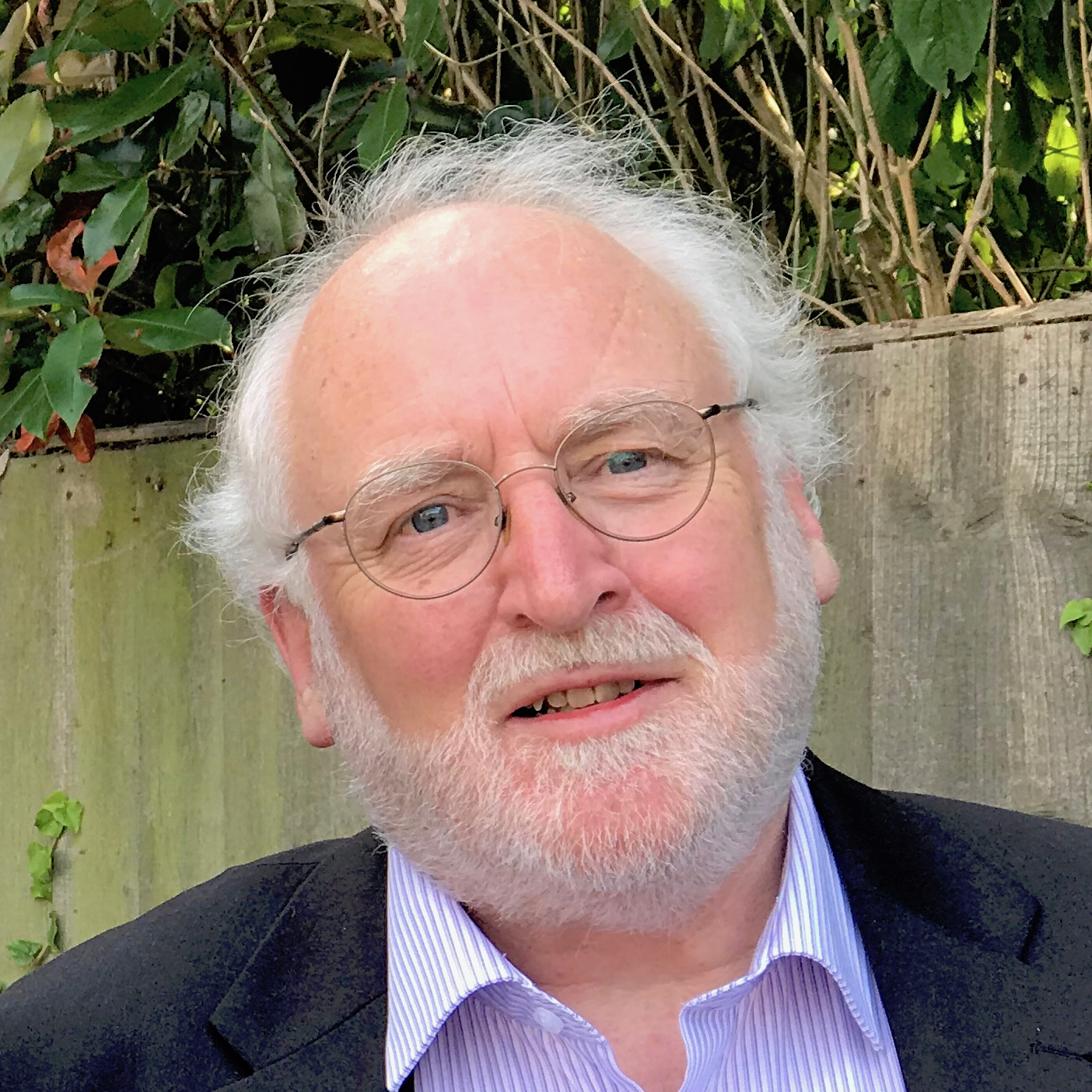
- Professor Allen (July 2018)
- Born: 23 June 1950 (age 76)
- Education: King's College London
- Scientific career
- Fields: Biochemistry

John Allen (born 23 June 1950) is a British biochemist. He is an honorary professor at the Department of Genetics, Evolution and Environment at the University College London in the United Kingdom.

== Background and education ==
Allen attended Lliswerry Primary School, Newport and Hartridge High School, Newport, Monmouthshire, Wales. He obtained a BSc from King's College London in 1972 from the School of Biological Sciences. He subsequently obtained a PhD from King's College as well. From 1975 to 1977, Allen was a Science and Engineering Research Council (SERC) postdoctoral research fellow at the Botany School of the University of Oxford. During his position as a postdoctoral research assistant at the Department of Biological Sciences, University of Warwick in the UK (1979-1983), he was also a visiting research associate at the University of Illinois Urbana-Champaign in the US (1980). In 1983 he took up a lectureship in the Department of Pure and Applied Biology at the University of Leeds. He returned to the US from 1986 to 1987 as a Nuffield Foundation Science Research Fellow at the Lawrence Berkeley National Laboratory. In 1990 he became Professor of Plant Physiology at the University of Oslo, Norway. He moved in 1992 to Sweden where he became the first professor in Plant Cell Biology at Lund University. He stayed in Lund until 2005 when he became a Professor of Biochemistry at Queen Mary University of London. He was honoured with a Royal Society Wolfson Research Merit Award (2005-2009). In 2015, he became honorary professor at University College London.

== Contributions to science ==
Allen is a plant biochemist, in particular relating to regulation of photosynthesis. His work has been cited over 12,000 times. He has given over 300 seminars in 22 countries and 4 continents. 19 of these were plenary or named lectures. Professor Allen's name is linked to the CoRR hypothesis which he formulated in 1993 in the Journal of Theoretical Biology, introducing the term "CoRR" in 2003. Briefly, the CoRR hypothesis states that endosymbiotic organelles such as mitochondria and chloroplasts retain genomes to provide for regulation of gene expression by electron transport and the redox state of the organelle.

In addition, Allen works on mitochondrial ageing in relation to sex.

== Honours and awards ==
Allen has been granted the following honours and awards:

- 2015-2017, Leverhulme Emeritus Research Fellow
- 2012-2013, Visiting Professor, Genetics, Evolution and Environment, University College London
- 2009–present, Fellow of the Linnean Society of London
- 2009-2010, Fellow of the Institute of Biology
- 2008, Rudi Lemberg Travelling Fellowship of the Australian Academy of Science
- 2007, William Evans Fellow at the University of Otago, New Zealand
- 1993–present, Member of the Royal Physiographic Society of Lund

== Selected highly cited publications ==
- Allen, John F. (1992). "Protein phosphorylation in regulation of photosynthesis". Biochimica et Biophysica Acta (BBA) - Bioenergetics. 1098 (3): 275–335. doi:10.1016/S0005-2728(09)91014-3. PMID 1310622.
- Allen, John F.; Bennett, John; Steinback, Katherine E.; Arntzen, Charles J. (1981). "Chloroplast protein phosphorylation couples plastoquinone redox state to distribution of excitation energy between photosystems". Nature. 291 (5810): 25–29. doi:10.1038/291025a0.
- Pfannschmidt, Thomas; Nilsson, Anders; Allen, John F. (1999). "Photosynthetic control of chloroplast gene expression". Nature. 397 (6720): 625–628. doi:10.1038/17624.
- Allen, J. F.; Forsberg, J. (2001). "Molecular recognition in thylakoid structure and function". Trends in Plant Science. 6 (7): 317–26. doi:10.1016/S1360-1385(01)02010-6. PMID 11435171.
- Allen, J. F. (1993). "Control of gene expression by redox potential and the requirement for chloroplast and mitochondrial genomes". Journal of Theoretical Biology. 165 (4): 609–31. doi:10.1006/jtbi.1993.1210. PMID 8114509. S2CID 26664598.
- Allen, J. F. (2003). "The function of genomes in bioenergetic organelles". Philosophical Transactions of the Royal Society B: Biological Sciences. 358 (1429): 19–38. doi:10.1098/rstb.2002.1191. PMC 1693096. PMID 12594916.
- Allen, J. F. (2003). "BOTANY: State Transitions--a Question of Balance". Science. 299 (5612): 1530–1532. doi:10.1126/science.1082833. PMID 12624254.
