= Charles George Lambie =

Charles George Lambie MB ChB MD FRSE MC (24 July 1891 – 28 August 1961) was a physician of Scots descent. He was the first doctor in Europe to use insulin in the treatment of diabetes. He came to later fame in the University of Sydney. Short of stature he was affectionately known as Wee Mon by his students.

== Life ==
He was born on 24 July 1891 in Port of Spain in Trinidad the only son of Sophia Agnes Theresa Stollmeyer and her husband, Lt Col George Lambie, commanding officer of the Trinidad Light Infantry Volunteers. As a child he was a gifted musician and gave piano concerts at the age of 8.

He was sent to boarding school in Scotland and was educated at Ayr Academy and Stanley House School in Stirlingshire. He went on to study medicine at the University of Edinburgh, graduating with an MB ChB in 1914. He was President of the Royal Medical Society in 1914–15, one of its youngest presidents. He won the Murchison Memorial Scholarship in 1915.

His career was immediately disrupted by World War I during which he joined the Royal Army Medical Corps in 1915, and saw action in Mesopotamia but was invalided out for a year to India where he served as a pathologist in Poona (now Pune). In 1917 he returned to active service on the Somme, rising to the rank of Captain and winning a Military Cross for bravery in 1918.

After the war he joined Professor Arthur Robertson Cushny in Edinburgh as a Research Assistant. In 1921 he went to the University of Toronto in Canada to work with professors Frederick Banting and Charles Best, the creators of insulin. In 1922 he returned to Edinburgh and became the first person in Europe to use insulin in the treatment of diabetes. He was then Assistant Physician at the Edinburgh Royal Infirmary on Lauriston Place, and had also begun lecturing at the University of Edinburgh. He was the Beit Memorial Fellow 1923 to 1926. During this period he was also elected a member of the Harveian Society of Edinburgh.

In 1927 he was elected a Fellow of the Royal Society of Edinburgh, his proposers being Alexander Gray McKendrick, George Barger, William Ogilvy Kermack, and William Glen Liston. He received his doctorate (MD) in the same year with his thesis The locus of insulin action, and was also awarded a Lister Fellowship.

In 1929 he declined a chair at the University of Aberdeen and instead travelled to Australia to take up the George Henry Bosch chair as Professor of Surgery at the University of Sydney. Here he worked with his predecessor Professor Harold R. Dew to completely reformulate the academic curriculum in the Medical Faculty. Working with Victor Trikojus, Lambie reported the first purification of thyroid-stimulating hormone, in 1937. He came to the defence of Trikojus when he was arrested under wartime security regulations as an enemy alien in 1941. At the same time, he confirmed the "ardent Nazi leanings" of another colleague at the university, Henry Brose.

In 1940 he became seriously ill with diabetes and was also diagnosed with a heart condition. He retired from the university in 1957 and took up a committee role in the New South Wales branch of the British Medical Association, then under the chairmanship of Sir William Morrow. He died of coronary vascular disease on 28 August 1961 at the Royal North Shore Hospital in Sydney. His body was cremated.

== Hobbies ==
Over and above his medical skills, Lambie was a skilled musician, studying composition under Edgar Bainton.

== Artistic recognition ==
His portrait by Nora Heysen is held by the University of Sydney.

== Family ==
In 1925 he married Eliza Anne Walton (1892-1965). They had two daughters, Brenda Jean (1926-2011) and Wilda Iona (1930-2011).

== Publications ==
- On the Locus of Insulin Action (1927)
- Clinical Diagnostic Methods (1947); co-written with Jean Armytage
- Light out of France (1951)
