= Carolyn Sue =

Clinical scientist

Carolyn Mary Sue AM is an Australian neurologist, scientist, professor and research director. She has been the executive director of the Kolling Institute of Medical Research since 2019 and is also Director of Neurogenetics at Royal North Shore Hospital, Director of the Centre of Excellence for Parkinson's Disease and Movement Disorders, and Director of the National Centre for Adult Stem Cell Research (Sydney Node). Sue specialises in complex neurogenetic conditions and runs tertiary referral clinics for patients with diseases such as Parkinson's, mitochondrial diseases, and other inherited movement disorders. Her research has identified several previously unknown mutations that cause neurogenetic disease.

== Education and career ==
Sue completed a medical degree at the University of New South Wales and a PhD at the University of Sydney in 1997. She then received an NHMRC Neil Hamilton Fairley Postdoctoral Fellowship to conduct post-doctoral studies in the laboratory of Salvatore DiMauro at Columbia University in New York City. In 2000, Sue returned to Sydney to direct her own research laboratory at the Kolling Institute of Medical Research. In 2011, she established the Centre of Excellence for Parkinson's Disease and Movement Disorders at Royal North Shore Hospital.

Professor Sue holds multiple titles and was the inaugural Professor in Neurology at Royal North Shore Hospital. She is also a Founding Director of the Australian Mitochondrial Disease Foundation, President-Elect for the Movement Disorder Society of Australia and New Zealand, and co-chair of the Education Committee for the International Parkinson's Disease and Movement Disorder Society.

== Biomedical research ==
Sue's research aims to improve our understanding of neurological disorders and develop new treatment options for patients. Her laboratory's collaboration with the Kolling Institute and the hospital allows for the study of cells taken directly from patients and induced into a stem cell state to elucidate the unique genetic diagnosis for individual patients. This may assist in family planning when patients have a known genetic mutation that causes disease.

Her laboratory currently runs several projects, including:

- Identification of reliable biomarkers to assist in the diagnosis of mitochondrial diseases, working with Dr Ryan Davis
- Investigating the interactions between the gut microbiome and Parkinson's disease, and the impact of Parkinson's disease treatments on the gut microbiome. This work is being conducted with Dr Michal Lubomski and Dr Ryan Davis in collaboration with Professor Andrew Holmes and Professor Jean Yang at the University of Sydney.
- Investigating the Nix pathway as an alternative approach to activating mitophagy in neurons, to improve the maintenance of healthy mitochondrial populations in neurons. This project is being conducted with Dr Wen Li, and in collaboration with Dr YuHong Fu and Professor Glenda Halliday at the University of Sydney.
- Using patient-derived cells to screen new drug therapies for hereditary spastic paraplegia, with Dr Gautam Wali and in collaboration with Professor Alan Mackay-Sim at Griffith University
- Using easily accessible patient samples to identify biomarkers of hereditary spastic paraplegia, with Dr Gautam Wali, Dr Sue-Faye Siow, and Dr. Kishore Kumar

Sue has published on the potential of mitochondrial donation as a potential strategy to tackle hereditary mitochondrial diseases. Mitochondrial donation allows the replacement of defective mitochondria with healthy mitochondria in an unborn child, with requires the use of assisted reproductive technologies to conceive a child from the genetic material of three persons. However, as mitochondrial DNA contributes only to cellular bioenergetics and not any other characteristics of the child, the oocyte donor (i.e., the mitochondria donor) does not contribute to a child's unique genomic identity. In 2022, Maeve's Law was passed by the Australian Parliament to legalise mitochondrial donation. Sue's future work will likely involve preparing and supporting her patients if they choose to undergo the procedure.

== Awards and recognition ==
In 2016, Sue was awarded a Presidential Award by the International Parkinson's Disease and Movement Disorder Society. In 2019, Sue was part of the Queen's Birthday Honours List and awarded a Member of the Order of Australia for significant services to medicine.

Sue was the executive director of the Kolling Institute of Medical Research (until she stepped down in 2022), a board member of the Brain and Mind Centre, and Professor of Neurology at the University of Sydney. She is also the Founder and Director of the Centre of Excellence for Parkinson's Disease and Movement Disorders, Director of Neurogenetics, Director of the Mitochondrial Disease Clinic, Director of the Genetic Movement Disorders Clinic, Director of the Hereditary Spastic Paraplegia Clinic, and Director of the Advanced Therapies for Parkinson's Disease Clinic at the Royal North Shore Hospital. In 2020, Sue was elected as a fellow of the Australian Academy of Health and Medical Sciences, one of 28 new fellows elected that year. Carolyn Sue is a highly recognised clinical scientist for her research work. Prof. Carolyn Sue was awarded $1.2 million for her work in precision diagnosis for patients with mitochondrial disease.
