= Victor Trikojus =

Australian professor of biochemistry

Professor Victor Trikojus CBE FAA
- Born: 5 February 1902; Sydney, New South Wales, Australia
- Died: 27 January 1985 (aged 82); Melbourne, Victoria, Australia
- Education: University of Sydney, University of Oxford
- Known for: Thyroid hormone biochemistry Drug synthesis Nutrition
- Awards: Commander of the Order of the British Empire, Fellow of the Australian Academy of Science
- Scientific career
- Fields: Organic chemistry, Biochemistry
- Institutions: University of Freiburg, Laboratorium des Staates, University of Sydney, University of Melbourne
- Thesis: The Introduction of the Methylenedioxy Group and of Similar Groups into the Aromatic Nucleus (1927)
- Doctoral advisor: William Henry Perkin, Jr.
- Other academic advisors: Arnold Loeser, Heinrich Wieland, Charles George Lambie
- Notable students: Catherine Anne Money

Victor Martin "Trik" Trikojus (1902–1985) was an Australian professor of biochemistry. Described as "more important than any other person in leading Australia into modern biochemistry", he was the second professor and head of the School of Biochemistry at the University of Melbourne from 1943 to 1968.

== Early life ==
Trikojus was born on 5 February 1902 in Darlinghurst, Sydney, to August Trikojus (1857–1911) and Charlotte (née Thompson, 1879–1955), his second wife. His father was a hairdresser and tobacconist of Lithuanian background born in Tilsit, East Prussia (now Sovetsk, Kaliningrad Oblast, Russia). His mother was of English background, born in Port Macquarie. He was the eldest of three children.

Trikojus attended Sydney Technical High School from 1916 to 1920 where he studied physics, chemistry, mathematics, history, English, German, woodwork, metalwork, and mechanical drawing. He became head prefect, captain and dux of the school, and a member of its rugby and rowing teams. It was here where he received the nickname "Trik", by which he would be known to his family, friends and colleagues for the rest of his life.

Trikojus earned a first class honours degree in organic chemistry from the University of Sydney in 1925. In that same year, he was awarded an 1851 Exhibition science research scholarship and chose to study at the University of Oxford under William Henry Perkin Jr. where he also rowed in the Queens College Eight. Trikojus' thesis was entitled 'The Introduction of the Methylenedioxy Group and of Similar Groups into the Aromatic Nucleus'; evidence of Perkin's habit of assigning his students small pieces of larger problems. This thesis earned him his Doctorate of Philosophy in 1927 making him only the second Australian to do so at Oxford, after Henry Brose. Trikojus and Perkin Jr. also published work on the synthesis of safrole. Following this, he was awarded a third year of his scholarship, which he spent in Munich, working under Heinrich Wieland at the Laboratorium des Staates.

== Research and Teaching ==
After nine months in Munich, Trikojus returned to Sydney late in 1928, due to his mother becoming ill. There he found a position of lecturer in the Department of Organic Chemistry at the University of Sydney. From having a European father and spending time in those countries, Trikojus felt comfortable in the more-vibrant émigré communities in Sydney. There he met his future wife, Russian émigrée Lisuscha Engels (born 1905 Fryanovo, Russian Empire, died 1984, Melbourne), who had accompanied her wool-buyer father from Germany. In 1932 he took up a lectureship in medical organic chemistry in the Department of Medicine. That was also the year he and Lisuscha married, living in Kings Cross. In print, his wife's first name was often anglicised to Elizabeth.

Until 1936, Trikojus' research was centred on discovering the chemical structures of organic compounds, and occasionally developing methods to synthesise organic compounds in the laboratory. He had published nine scientific papers on this kind of work. 1936 marked a major shift in his interests when the head of his department, Prof. Charles George Lambie, published work on thyroid hormone metabolism. Trikojus began his sabbatical leave that year in Germany, at the University of Freiburg, working on thyrotropic hormone (better known as thyroid-stimulating hormone) with Arnold Loeser. Thyroid enzymes would remain his primary research interest throughout his scientific career. Lisuscha accompanied him, along with their first child, Nina (born 1934), who died suddenly that year in Stuttgart of a respiratory infection. After returning to Australia in 1937, Trikojus and Lisuscha had another daughter, Natalja.

On 1 November 1937, Trikojus wrote an article entitled ‘Some impressions of Germany and neighbouring countries’ (Australian Institute of International Affairs), in which he stated, "I have been greatly impressed by the regeneration which Hitler has wrought in the nation" and "The anti-Jewish propaganda continues, but it is not serious... It is interesting to note that any Jews who are useful to the Nazis are kept in their positions". These comments, which his colleagues later labelled as 'naive', assumed far greater significance after the outbreak of war and, together with Trikojus' involvement in choosing German scientists to be brought to Australia by the government, resulted in accusations of being a Nazi sympathiser. These accusations were strenuously rejected by his colleagues as either unfounded allegations or misinterpretations combined with misunderstandings of the political environment of the 1930s and 1940s. His biographers Legge and Gibson note that "a number of members of Lisuscha's family were still living in Germany, and he may simply have been careful to avoid making any remarks that might conceivably affect them."

== World War II ==
In 1940, Trikojus was chair of the Drugs Subcommittee of the Australian Association of Scientific Workers. The Australian pharmaceutical industry was insufficiently advanced to produce critical drugs in the event of ships carrying drug imports from Europe and the USA being stopped by the German or Japanese navies. Assisted by G. K. Hughes, he organised the up-scaling of drug production for 11 different drugs critical for the war effort including ascorbic acid (vitamin C) and sulfaguanidine. His previous experience in the development of methods to synthesise organic compounds was invaluable in his efforts. His son, future cinematographer Alexander (Sasha) Trikojus was also born that year.

Meanwhile, suspicions grew regarding Trikojus' loyalty to Australia, given his German-born father and extensive ties to Germany. In late 1940 it was rumoured that his office had been searched. The Ministerial Order for his detention, signed by Robert Menzies on 6 January 1941, contained 19 grounds for his internment. His biographer Ross Humphreys places these assertions in five categories: "misunderstandings, supposedly subversive statements... inappropriately applied, non-specific accusations, guilt by association, [and his] chairmanship of the Drugs sub-committee." These included his friendship with the pro-Nazi lecturer in German, Gerhard Neumann, who was interned on the outbreak of war in 1939.

On 17 January 1941, Trikojus was arrested as an enemy alien under National Security Regulations and spent 13 weeks in Long Bay gaol, then used as a temporary internment camp. The case against him was never made clear and Trikojus never spoke publicly about it; there were suggestions that internal rivalries at the University of Sydney, including his acrimonious relationship with Henry Brose, who was also arrested, had played a part.

After a review of his case, and pressure from his colleagues, he was released on 11 April, on condition that he resign as chair of the Drugs sub-committee. 29 of his colleagues gave evidence in his support. Responding to the evidence against him, while admitting he had positive opinions of the Nazis in 1937, Trikojus had a great change of heart in March 1939 when Hitler broke the Munich Agreement and invaded the rest of Czechoslovakia. He framed his earlier pro-German passages written in letters to colleagues and friends in Germany as being made out of necessity, and that had he written anti-German statements, the receipients of those letters may have been sent to concentration camps. Vice-chancellor Robert Strachan Wallace and Hugh Ward among others attested to his anti-nazi views.

He immediately resumed his duties lecturing at the university and coordinating methods of producing critical war drugs so they could be handed off to industry. This included organising the manufacture of 45 kg of sulfaguanidine in a laboratory in his university's medical school, for the New Guinea campaign in 1942. He ceded patent rights for his sulfaguanidine manufacturing process to Monsanto so full-scale production could be expedited. His process for ascorbic acid synthesis was likewise handed over to Colonial Sugar Refineries (now CSR limited).

Trikojus was still subject to various restriction orders until 1944, requiring him to report to the police regularly, his nationality was wrongly marked as 'naturalized', and despite instructing solicitors, no compensation or redress for his detention ever came. A security dossier on Trikojus continued to be compiled until 1958.

== Professor of Biochemistry ==
By 1943, the drug import routes were judged safe enough for work on domestic production to end, and the Trikojus family moved to Melbourne after being appointed head of the Biochemistry Department at the University of Melbourne. He inherited such an under-staffed and under-resourced department that one of the most complicated pieces of equipment in it was a hand-cranked bench centrifuge. He spent much of his time and energy doing administrative work to bring the department up to the standard of the other major universities. His workload was further increased when student numbers swelled after the war, supported by the Commonwealth Reconstruction and Training Scheme. A new biochemistry building was needed, with Trikojus overseeing the construction and assisting in its design. The building was opened in stages between 1958 and 1961. This building, the first in Australia to be devoted to the study and teaching of biochemistry, housed researchers until 2005, when they were moved to the new Bio21 institute nearby. It was demolished in 2008, and in its place the Australian Centre for Neuroscience and Mental Health Research was constructed.

During his tenure, the University of Melbourne was transformed from an undergraduate teaching university to an internationally oriented research university that encouraged collaboration between universities. In 1948 Trikojus and his protégé F. J. R. Hird isolated and identified the thyroid hormone triiodothyronine (T_{3}), however this discovery is generally attributed to Rosalind Pitt-Rivers, who read their paper but omitted mention of it. Trikojus continued building up the Russell Grimwade School of Biochemistry, in which he integrated organic chemistry and biochemistry, as well as links to other disciplines. He was a foundation member (1955), chairman (1956), and honorary life member (1964) of the Australian Biochemical Society and a fellow (1954), and vice-president (1964–66) of the Australian Academy of Science. He was a foundation member (1958) and life member (1968) of the Endocrine Society of Australia. In 1958 he was president of University House, the university's staff club. He was also Melbourne's first professorial dean of graduate studies (1963–65) and a foundation member (1965–66) of the Australian Research Grants Committee. He also supervised graduate students, including the masters research of Catherine Anne Money, and was inspirational to countless other medical students and science graduates.

Trikojus was well-liked by his colleagues and students, who found in him a courteous and compassionate authority figure with a legendary capacity for research, teaching, and administrative work. F. J. R. Hird wrote that he was a "formidable man to deal with. It could not be said that he was a man of consensus. We in the department were never short of leadership." His department was among the first at the university to institute regular staff meetings, as he "built a biochemistry department that was second to none in Australia." On retirement in 1968, he was made an honorary research professor, and was appointed CBE in 1971. He remained active in the International Union of Biochemists and as a visiting scientist in the early 1970s. He continued contributing to scientific journals until 1974. Suffering Parkinson's disease in his later years, Victor Trikojus died on 27 January 1985 in the Melbourne suburb of Kew and was cremated. 73 boxes of his papers were donated by his family to The University of Melbourne Archives, where they are held.
