= Leonard Ulysses Hibbard =

Australian physicist (1916–2008)

- Born: 2 November 1916; Sydney
- Died: 21 December 2008 (aged 92); Sydney
- Education: University of Sydney; University of Birmingham
- Scientific career
- Workplaces: Australian National University; CSIRO
- Thesis: The radio frequency system of the Birmingham proton synchrotron (1950)
- Doctoral advisor: Mark Oliphant

Leonard Ulysses Hibbard (2 November 1916 – 21 December 2008) was an Australian physicist who helped build the Birmingham proton synchrotron in the United Kingdom and the 500 MJ homopolar generator at the Australian National University in Canberra in Australia. He also built the first atomic clock in Australia.

== Biography ==
Leonard Ulysses Hibbard was born in Sydney on 2 November 1916, the youngest of three sons of Victor Ulysses Hibbard, a grazier, and his wife, Gertrude née Nielsen, a costumier. He was educated at North Sydney Boys High. His passed the leaving examination in 1934 and was awarded entry to the faculty of engineering at the University of Sydney. He graduated with a Bachelor of Science degree with first-class honours and the University Medal in mathematics in 1937, and a Bachelor of Engineering degree with first-class honours and the University Medal in mechanical and electrical engineering in 1939.

Hibbard gave lectures on communications engineering at the University of Sydney and during the Second World War he worked for the Council for Scientific and Industrial Research (CSIR) on improving and fitting radar and radio equipment. When the cargo liner SS Doric Star was sunk by the German cruiser Admiral Graf Spee in December 1939, the radio equipment that Hibbard had modified allowed it to send out a powerful distress signal that allowed the British to track and ultimately engage the German raider in the Battle of the River Plate. For his contribution, Hibbard was sent a congratulatory telegram from Siemens Brothers, the British company that made the Doric Star's radio equipment.

After the war ended, Hibbard set off for England to study under Mark Oliphant at the University of Birmingham. During a visit to Panama City he met a fellow Australian, Joan Single, who had served in the Women's Royal Air Force during the war. She had come back to Australia after it had ended, but was now headed back to England. They were subsequently married in England and had two daughters, Nicola and Wendy, and a son, Paul. Hibbard used his knowledge of radio and electronics to help Oliphant build the first proton synchrotron. This formed the basis of his 1950 Doctor of Philosophy thesis on "The radio frequency system of the Birmingham proton synchrotron".

Oliphant returned to Australia in 1951 to take up a position as professor of physics at the new Australian National University in Canberra. Hibbard followed and worked with Oliphant on the design and construction of a 500 MJ homopolar generator, the world's largest. When completed, its four 20-tonne steel disks could be accelerated to 1000 rpm and produced 1.8 million Amperes. In 1954, Hibbard testified before the Royal Commission on Espionage that he had joined the Communist Party of Australia while he was a member of the New South Wales branch of the Australian Association of Scientific Workers and that his "party task" had been to inform scientists about the party's views.

In 1964, Hibbard joined CSIRO's national standards laboratory in Sydney where, among other things, he built the first atomic clock in Australia. He retired in 1981, when he turned 65. He died in Sydney on 21 December 2008.
