= 1964 Mount Isa Mines strike =

Coordinates: 20.7161°S 139.4760°E

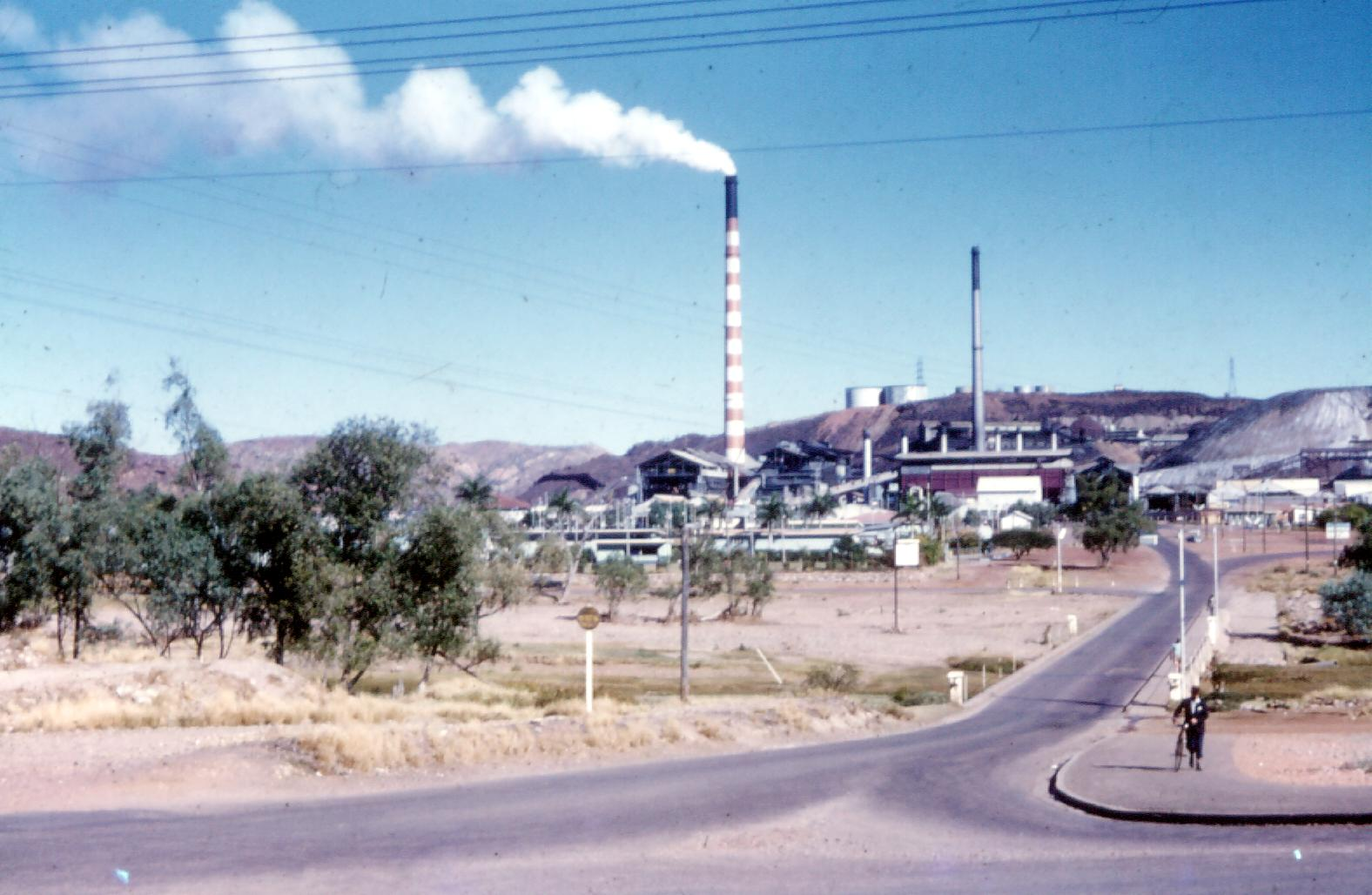
Mount Isa Mine in June 1962 as seen from the town CBD.

The 1964 Mount Isa Mines dispute was an Australian eight-month industrial dispute between miners and management at Mount Isa Mines (MIM) in Mount Isa, Queensland.

== Background ==
A previous 1961 strike at MIM was precipitated by legislation that threatened employees' contract bonuses. It ended with an uneasy truce when State Premier Frank Nicklin proclaimed a state of emergency, ordering unions back to work, and MIM back to the negotiating table.

The dispute erupted again in August 1964, when the State Industrial Conciliation and Arbitration Commission rejected a proposal for a weekly pay rise of £4 in lieu of an increase to the bonuses. The miners, prominently led by Pat Mackie, began to work to wage, a go slow tactic that led to reduced mine output. Dissension arose in union ranks over the direction the industrial dispute should take, with AWU leaders refusing to expand the dispute outside Mount Isa. Mackie was accused of communism and expelled from the AWU. Mackie and other militant unionists were also dismissed from MIM.

By 10 December, Premier Nicklin issued an order-in-council, demanding MIM employees return to contract work, and increasing police powers to enforce the matter. The order-in-council was quickly amended to allow the dismissal of workers unwilling to comply. MIM immediately fired 230 underground miners and locked out the rest.

== State of emergency ==
Premier Nicklin declared another state of emergency on 27 January 1965, permitting police to cordon off Mount Isa, enter houses without warrant, and seize strike materials. This order-in-council was met with widespread disapproval, and was withdrawn four days later. The dispute petered out through February and March, as enough miners returned to work to resume production. A large number of workers' demands were eventually met in the MIM Award of June 1965.

The story of the dispute inspired a Queensland Music Festival musical production titled Red Cap, which premiered at the Mount Isa Civic Centre on 11 July 2007.
