= World Peace Council prizes =

Awards for individuals, organisations and places

The World Peace Council (WPC), a pro-Soviet non-governmental organization, has awarded a number of prizes, beginning in 1950. These have been awarded to individuals, organisations, peoples, and places. Typically, several winners would be voted at one WPC congress; these, or their representative, would receive their prize at a later congress, or from a WPC delegation. Extra prizes were awarded in 1959 and 1964, to mark the WPC's 10th and 15th anniversaries.

The awards include:

- International Peace Prize established at the first World Congress of Peace held in April 1949, in Paris. The original 1949 regulations envisaged prizes for art, literature, film, or industrial work which advanced the cause of peace among nations. In 1951, the WPC recategorised three distinct awards:
  - International Peace Prize, last awarded in 1957.
  - Honorary International Peace Prize, for posthumous award.
  - Medal of Peace, renamed in 1959 the Joliot-Curie Medal of Peace, in honour of Frédéric Joliot-Curie, who led the WPC till his death in 1958. This medal has been awarded in silver, but the highest WPC honour is the gold medal.
- Ho Chi Minh Award, a leadership award established in honour of Ho Chi Minh (not to be confused with the Ho Chi Minh Prizes awarded by the Vietnamese government).
- Amilcar Cabral Award, established in 1973 in honour of Amílcar Cabral, for contributions to "the struggle against imperialism and colonialism". (The Cape Verde and Guinea-Bissau governments also award Amilcar Cabral prizes.)

The WPC was allied with the Soviet Union and followed its foreign policy line during the Cold War. Some recipients of its prizes have also won the Lenin Peace Prize, a separate prize awarded by a panel appointed by the Soviet government.

== List of award winners ==
Date	Awardee	Type	Country	Award	Notes	Refs
1950	Julius Fučík	Person	Czechoslovakia	Honorary International Peace Prize	Posthumous.	
1950	Pablo Picasso	Person	Spain	International Peace Prize		
1950	Pablo Neruda	Person	Chile	International Peace Prize		
1950	Paul Robeson	Person	United States	International Peace Prize		
1950	Nâzım Hikmet	Person	Turkey	International Peace Prize		
1950	Wanda Jakubowska	Person	Poland	International Peace Prize	For her 1948 film Ostatni etap ("The Last Stage")	
1950	Candido Portinari	Person	Brazil	Gold Medal		
1950	Jean-Richard Bloch	Person	France	Gold Medal		
1950	Mihail Sadoveanu	Person	Romania	Gold Medal		
1950	Renato Guttuso	Person	Italy	Gold Medal		
1950	Václav Dobiaš	Person	Czechoslovakia	Gold Medal		
1950	Louis Daquin	Person	France	Gold Medal		
1950	Al-Tariq	Work	Lebanon	Gold Medal	Journal.	
1950	Iunost' mira (Юность мира, "Youth of the World")	Work	Soviet Union / Hungary	Gold Medal	Documentary about the 1949 World Youth Festival in Budapest.	
1950	Warsaw	Place	Poland	Honorary International Peace Prize	An exceptional award to the city as "a symbol of peaceful restoration".	
1953	Nikola Vaptsarov	Person	Bulgaria	Honorary International Peace Prize	Posthumous award.	
1953	Leopoldo Méndez	Person	Mexico	International Peace Prize	Member of the Comite por la Paz Mexicano	
1953	Mulk Raj Anand	Person	India	International Peace Prize		
1953	W.E.B. Du Bois	Person	United States	International Peace Prize	Won the Lenin Peace Prize in 1959.	
1953	Paul Éluard	Person	France	International Peace Prize		
1953	Halldór Laxness	Person	Iceland	International Peace Prize		
1953	Martin Hellberg	Person	Germany DR	International Peace Prize	For directing Das verurteilte Dorf ("The condemned village").	
1953	Kurt Stern	Person	Germany DR	International Peace Prize	For co-writing Das verurteilte Dorf ("The condemned village").	
1953	Jeanne Stern	Person	Germany DR	International Peace Prize	For co-writing Das verurteilte Dorf ("The condemned village").	
1953	Jean Effel	Person	France	Gold Medal		
1953	Vítězslav Nezval	Person	Czechoslovakia	Gold Medal		
1953	James Aldridge	Person	Australia	Gold Medal	For his novel The Diplomat.	
1953	Cláudio Santoro	Person	Brazil	Gold Medal	For his orchestral work Canto de Amor e Paz.	
1953	Maria Rosa Oliver	Person	Argentina	Gold Medal		
1953	Toshiko Akamatsu	Person	Japan	Gold Medal	For Hiroshima panels	
1953	Iri Maruki	Person	Japan	Gold Medal	For Hiroshima panels	
1953	Bozorg Alavi	Person	Iran	Gold Medal		
1953	Jean Salandre	Person	France	Gold Medal		
1953	S. Csorvás	Person	Romania	Gold Medal	For sculpture "Korean partisans"	
1953	Carlos Augusto León	Person	Venezuela	Gold Medal		
1953	Luis Carlos Pérez	Person	Colombia	Gold Medal		
1953	Wäinö Aaltonen	Person	Finland	Gold Medal	For statue entitled "Peace".	
1954	Charlie Chaplin	Person	United Kingdom	International Peace Prize		
1954	Dmitri Shostakovich	Person	Soviet Union	International Peace Prize		
1955	Béla Bartók	Person	Hungary	Honorary International Peace Prize	Posthumous award	
1955	Édouard Herriot	Person	France	International Peace Prize		
1955	Joris Ivens	Person	Netherlands	International Peace Prize		
1955	Cesare Zavattini	Person	Italy	International Peace Prize		
1955	Josué de Castro	Person	Brazil	International Peace Prize		
1956	Irène Joliot-Curie	Person	France	Honorary International Peace Prize	Posthumous award	
1956	William Howard Melish	Person	United States	International Peace Prize		
1956	Qi Baishi	Person	China PR	International Peace Prize		
1956	Nikos Kazantzakis	Person	Greece	International Peace Prize		
1957	Bertrand Russell	Person	United Kingdom	International Peace Prize	Refused award.	
1957	Guo Moruo	Person	China PR	Joliot-Curie medal		
1959	Manolis Glezos	Person	Greece	Joliot-Curie gold medal		
1959	Tristao de Braganza Cunha	Person	Goa	Gold medal	Posthumous award	
1959	Afro-Asian People's Solidarity Organisation	Organisation	International	Gold medal		
1959	Mouvement de la Paix	Organisation	France	Gold medal		
1959	Czechoslovak Peace Committee	Organisation	Czechoslovakia	Gold medal		
1959	Boris Polevoy	Person	Soviet Union	Gold medal		
1959	Zaharia Stancu	Person	Romania	Gold medal		
1959	George Hanna	Person	Lebanon	Gold medal		
1959	Olga Poblete de Espinosa	Person	Chile	Gold medal		
1959	Eva Sanderson	Person	Canada	Gold medal		
1959	Alexei Adzhubei	Person	Soviet Union	silver medal		
1959	Yuri Zhukov	Person	Soviet Union	Joliot-Curie silver medal		
1959	Konstantin Fedin	Person	Soviet Union	Joliot-Curie silver medal		
1959	Trofim Lysenko	Person	Soviet Union	Joliot-Curie silver medal		
?	Aleksandr V. Topchiev	Person	Soviet Union	Silver medal		
1959	Katharine Susannah Prichard	Person	Australia	Medal		
1959	Igor Kurchatov	Person	Soviet Union	Joliot-Curie silver medal		
1959	Bill Morrow	Person	Australia	Joliot-Curie silver medal		
1959	R. K. Aggarwal	Person	India	Joliot-Curie silver medal		
1959	Pyotr Kapitsa	Person	Soviet Union	Joliot-Curie silver medal		
1959	Juan Marinello Vidaurreta	Person	Cuba	Joliot-Curie silver medal		
1960	Ferdinando Targetti	Person	Italy	Gold medal		
1960	Walter Diehl	Person	Germany FR	Gold medal		
1960	Edith Höreth-Menge	Person	Germany FR	Gold medal		
1960	Erwin Eckert	Person	Germany FR	Gold medal		
1960	Gerhard Wohlrath	Person	Germany FR	Jubilee Silver medal		
1960	Gustav Tiefes	Person	Germany FR	Jubilee Silver medal		
1960	Johannes Oberhof	Person	Germany FR	Jubilee Silver medal		
1960	Erich Kompalla	Person	Germany FR	Jubilee Silver medal		
1960	Nikita Khrushchev	Person	Soviet Union	Medal		
1961	Ilya Ehrenburg	Person	Soviet Union	Gold medal	Marking his 70th birthday.	
1961	Eugénie Cotton	Person	France	Gold medal	Marking her 80th birthday.	
1961	World Federation of Democratic Youth	Organisation	International	Gold medal		
?	Political prisoners in Francoist Spain	Persons	Spain	Gold medal		
?	Nikolai Gribachev	Person	Soviet Union	Grand Silver medal		
?	Dmitri Skobeltsyn	Person	Soviet Union	Medal		
?	Lazaro Cardenas	Person	Mexico	Joliot-Curie medal		
1963	Manolis Glezos	Person	Greece	Gold medal		
1963	Gregoris Lambrakis	Person	Greece	Gold medal	Posthumous award	
1963	Jaramogi Oginga Odinga	Person	Kenya	Gold medal		
1964	Julián Grimau	Person	Spain	Gold medal	Posthumous award.	
1964	Tawfiq Munir	Person	Iraq	Gold medal	Posthumous award.	
1964	Ahmed Boumendjel	Person	Algeria	Gold medal	Posthumous award.	
1964	Árpád Szakasits	Person	Hungary	Gold medal	Marking his 75th birthday.	
1964	Ferdinando Targetti	Person	Italy	Gold medal		
1964	Walter Friedrich	Person	Germany DR	Gold medal		
1964	Alfred Weber	Person	Germany FR	Gold medal		
1964	Wilhelm Elfes	Person	Germany FR	Gold medal		
1964	Hewlett Johnson	Person	United Kingdom	Gold medal		
1964	Stanisław Kulczyński	Person	Poland	Gold medal		
1964	Yiangos Potamitis	Person	Cyprus	Gold medal		
1964	Alberto T. Casella	Person	Argentina	Gold medal		
1964	José R. Gabaldón	Person	Venezuela	Gold medal		
1964	Jean Boulier	Person	France	Gold medal		
1964	Wanda Wasilewska	Person	Soviet Union / Poland	Gold medal		
1964	Viktor Chkhikvadze	Person	Soviet Union	Gold medal		
1964	Mikhail Kotov	Person	Soviet Union	Gold medal		
1964	Hiroshima	Place	Japan	Gold medal		
1964	Nagasaki	Place	Japan	Gold medal		
1964	Nelson Mandela	Person	South Africa	Joliot-Curie gold medal		
1964	Jarosław Iwaszkiewicz	Person	Poland	Joliot-Curie gold medal		
1965	Khaled Mohi El Din	Person	Egypt	Gold medal		
1965	Shafi Ahmed el Sheikh	Person	Sudan	Gold medal		
1965	Francis John Hartley & A. M. Dickie	Person	Australia	Joliot-Curie gold medal		
1965	Eric Henry Stoneley Burhop	Person	Australia	Joliot-Curie gold medal		
1966	Valentina Tereshkova	Person	Soviet Union	Joliot-Curie gold medal		
1966	Agostinho Neto	Person	Angola	Joliot-Curie medal		
1966	Juan Marinello Vidaurreta	Person	Cuba	Joliot-Curie gold medal		
1968	Pablo Neruda	Person	Chile	Joliot-Curie gold medal		
1969	György Lukács	Person	Hungary	Joliot-Curie medal		
1969	Dondogiyn Tsevegmid	Person	Mongolia	Joliot-Curie medal		
1969	Denis Nowell Pritt	Person	United Kingdom	Joliot-Curie medal		
1969	Hugo Pesce	Person	Peru	Joliot-Curie medal	Posthumous award.	
1970	Jawaharlal Nehru	Person	India	Joliot-Curie medal	Posthumous award.	
1971	Martin Luther King Jr.	Person	United States	Joliot-Curie gold medal	Posthumous award, accepted by Ralph Abernathy of the Southern Christian Leadership Conference.	
1971	Auschwitz-Birkenau State Museum	Organisation	Poland	Joliot-Curie gold medal		
1972	Amílcar Cabral	Person	Guinea-Bissau / Cape Verde	Joliot-Curie medal		
1972	Fidel Castro	Person	Cuba	Joliot-Curie gold medal		
1972	Yumjaagiin Tsedenbal	Person	Mongolia	Joliot-Curie gold medal		
1972	Gamal Abdel Nasser	Person	Egypt	Joliot-Curie medal	Posthumous award.	
1972	Salvador Allende	Person	Chile	Joliot-Curie gold medal		
1972	Coalition for Peace and Justice	Organisation	United States	Joliot-Curie medal		
1972	Organization of African Unity	Organisation	International	Joliot-Curie medal		
1972	"the people of Lao fighting for independence and freedom"	Place	Laos	Joliot-Curie medal		
1973	Raymond Goor	Person	Belgium	Joliot-Curie gold medal		
1973	Sheikh Mujibur Rahman	Person	Bangladesh	Joliot-Curie gold medal	For his contribution to the establishment of world peace.	
1974	Edward Gierek	Person	Poland	Joliot-Curie gold medal		
1975	Urho Kekkonen	Person	Finland	Joliot-Curie gold medal		
1975	Yasser Arafat	Person	Palestine	Joliot-Curie gold medal		
1975	Makarios III	Person	Cyprus	Joliot-Curie gold medal		
1975	Government of North Vietnam	Organisation	Vietnam DR	Joliot-Curie gold medal		
1975	Government of South Vietnam	Organisation	Vietnam Rep	Joliot-Curie gold medal		
1975	United Nations Special Committee against Apartheid	Organisation	International	Joliot-Curie gold medal		
1975	United Nations Special Committee on Decolonisation	Organisation	International	Joliot-Curie gold medal		
1975	Leonid Brezhnev	Person	Soviet Union	Joliot-Curie gold medal	Considered a riposte to Andrei Sakharov's 1975 Nobel Peace Prize.	
1976	Samora Machel	Person	Mozambique	Joliot-Curie gold medal		
1977	Vietnam	Place	Vietnam	Joliot-Curie medal	Presented to Nguyễn Hữu Thọ. The Vietnamese government had earlier awarded the WPC its Friendship Order.	
1977	World Marxist Review	Work	Czechoslovakia			
1977	Nicolae Ceauşescu	Person	Romania	Joliot-Curie medal	The award was delayed by Soviet objections, but pushed through by Indira Gandhi.	
1978	Mengistu Haile Mariam	Person	Ethiopia	Joliot-Curie gold medal		
1979	Souphanouvong	Person	Laos	Joliot-Curie gold medal		
1979	Michael Manley	Person	Jamaica	Joliot-Curie gold medal		
1980	Heng Samrin	Person	Kampuchea	Joliot-Curie medal		
1980	Yasser Arafat	Person	Palestine	Ho Chi Minh award		
1980	Federico Sotolongo Guerra	Person	Cuba	Medal		
1981	Sandinista National Liberation Front	Organisation	Nicaragua	Ho Chi Minh award		
1981	Líber Seregni	Person	Uruguay	Joliot-Curie gold medal		
1983	Enuga Sreenivasulu Reddy	Person	India	Joliot-Curie gold medal	Director of the UN Centre against Apartheid	
1983	Yusuf Maitama Sule	Person	Nigeria	Joliot-Curie gold medal	Chairman of the UN Special Committee against Apartheid	
1985	James E. Jackson	Person	United States	Joliot-Curie gold medal		
1986	African National Congress	Organisation	South Africa	Ho Chi Minh award	Accepted by Oliver Tambo.	
1986	Sam Nujoma	Person	Namibia	Ho Chi Minh award		
1986	Bratislava	Place	Czechoslovakia	Town of Peace		
1988	Julius Nyerere	Person	Tanzania	Joliot-Curie medal		
1988	Pimen I of Moscow	Person	Soviet Union	Joliot-Curie gold medal		
1989	Daniel Ortega	Person	Nicaragua	Joliot-Curie gold medal		
?	P. J. Patterson	Person	Jamaica	Joliot-Curie medal		

In 2002, the WPC denied news reports that it had given a prize to Meles Zenawi.
