= Kolling Institute of Medical Research =

Medical research institute, Sydney

The Kolling
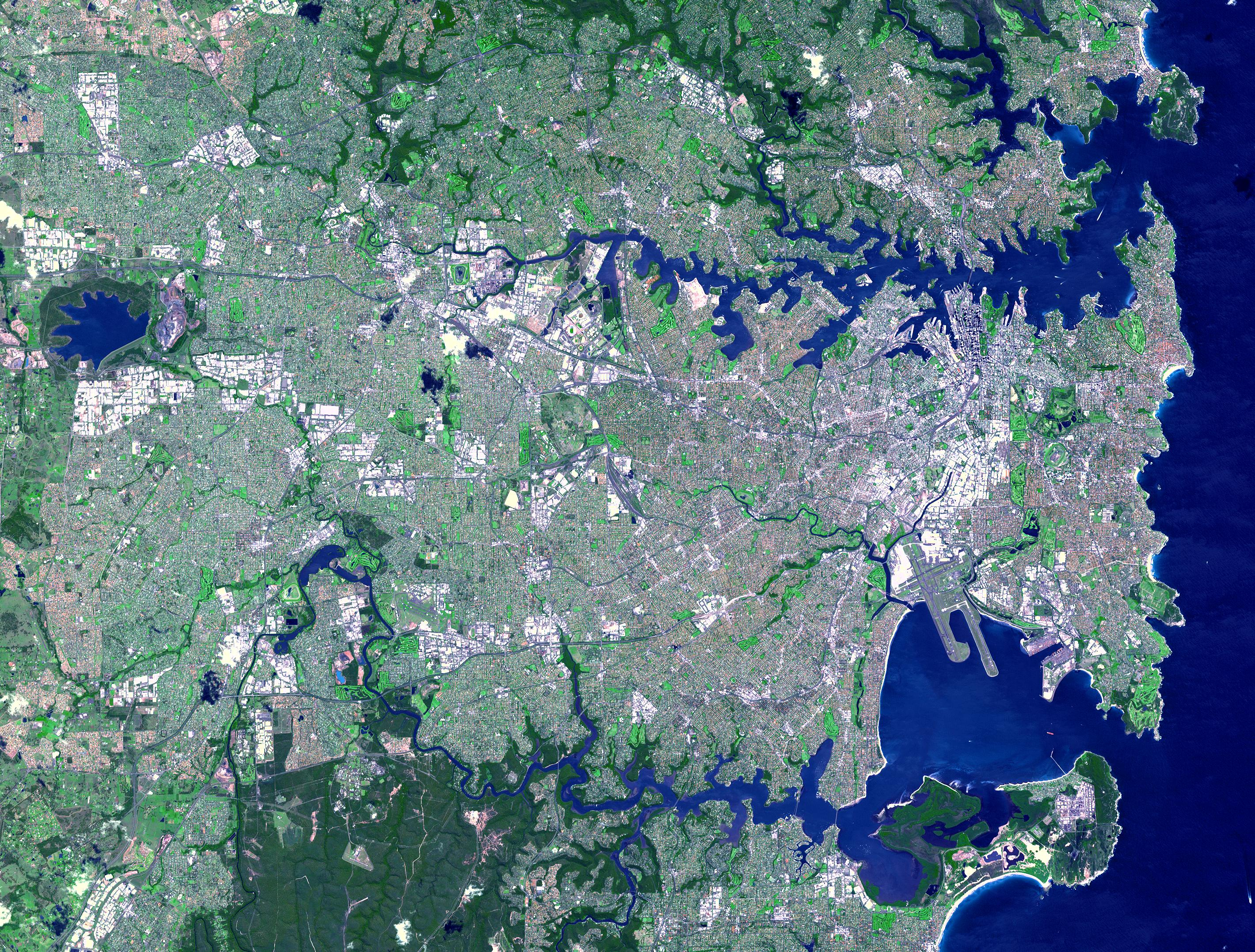
- Location within Sydney, Australia

General information
- Location: RNSH, Sydney, Australia
- Coordinates: 33°49′14″S 151°11′27″E
- Topped-out: 2017
- Cost: Au$99M
- Owner: NSW Department of Health

Technical details
- Floor count: 12

Design and construction
- Architect: Hassell
- Engineer: Bovis Lend Lease

Website
- Kolling Institute

The Kolling Institute is located in the grounds of the Royal North Shore Hospital in St Leonards, Sydney Australia. The institute, founded in 1920, is the oldest medical research institute in New South Wales.

The Kolling Institute is a part of the Northern Clinical School, University of Sydney.

== History ==
The Institute of Pathological Research was established in a cottage within the grounds of the Royal North Shore Hospital in 1920 with the appointment of a biochemist. Doctor W. Wilson Ingram was appointed as the first director in 1928. He remained in the post for almost 50 years. During his tenure, he expanded the medical knowledge of diabetes, opening the first clinic for its treatment in Australia . He also accompanied Sir Douglas Mawson on two Antarctic expeditions as medical officer and research scientist between 1929 and 1931.

A new two-story building was officially opened in 1931 and named the Kolling Institute after businessman Charles Kolling following an in memoriam donation from his widow Eva Kolling.

In the last few years, the Kolling Institute has expanded to include other research groups from the Royal North Shore campus. The Kolling Institute was thus rebranded upon relocation to the new Kolling Building in late 2008.

== Directors ==
Dr Max Rudolf "Rudi" Lemberg held an appointment within the institute from 1935 to 1972, establishing a major research focus on porphyrins, structures within molecules which give the red colour to blood and the yellow colour to bile. Rudi Lemberg became a Fellow of the Royal Society and was one of the founders of biochemistry in Australia.

Bill Ingram was succeeded in 1974 by Dr David Nelson who directed the institute until his death in 1989. David Nelson's research focus was in immune responses and allergy, particularly the involvement of the blood coagulation system in these processes.

Professor Robert Baxter became the third director of the Kolling Institute in 1994. Professor Baxter is an international leader in the endocrinology, cell biology and biochemistry of cellular growth factors and is listed as an Institute for Scientific Information highly cited researcher. The existing endocrinology research group (led by Dr Bruce Robinson) expanded into insulin growth factors and IGF binding proteins. Professor Baxter resigned as director in December 2011, and is continuing with his research interests at the institute.

In January 2012, Professor Jonathan Morris commenced as the fourth director of the Kolling Institute. Professor Morris was the associate dean and head of the Northern Clinical School. Professor Morris believed that the future direction of the Kolling lay in the adoption of the academic health centre culture, where medical research breakthroughs lead to direct clinical benefits for patients.

In May 2019, Professor Carolyn Sue became the fifth director of research, Kolling Institute after being interim director for 12 months. Professor Sue is also the director of neurogenetics at Royal North Shore Hospital and director of the National Centre for Adult Stem Cell Research (Sydney). Her focus is on strengthening the institute's research performance in its quest to deliver translational research outcomes for patients.

== The Kolling Institute today ==
Over the decades the Kolling Institute grew substantially and extended into a number of other buildings across the Royal North Shore Hospital campus. In October 2008 Kolling Institute researchers came together in a new research facility known as the Kolling Building.

The Kolling Institute is now a research facility of both the Northern Sydney Local Health District and the University of Sydney. In addition to laboratory-based research in the Kolling Building, its programs include the clinical and public health research activities of its associated divisions. Its activities are substantially funded by competitive grants, supported by donations and other non-competitive funding, and underpinned by the Medical Research Support Program of the NSW Office for Science and Medical Research. The Kolling Institute is accredited by the National Health and Medical Research Council and is a member of the Association of Australian Medical Research Institutes.

== Research interests ==
The Kolling Institute's research interests fall under the following categories:

- Growth research
- Cancer genetics
- Perinatal research
- Renal Medicine research
- Neurogenetics research
- Pain management research
- Cardiac technology
- Hypertension and stroke research
- Bone and joint research
- Laboratory and community genetics
- Cancer Diagnosis and Pathology Research Group

== Research laboratories at the Kolling Institute ==
Over the decades the Kolling Institute grew substantially and extended into a number of other buildings across the Royal North Shore Hospital campus. In late 2008 these dispersed laboratories were consolidated into the new Kolling Building, a purpose-built medical research and education facility which was funded jointly by the NSW Department of Health and the University of Sydney. In addition to four floors for educational activities, the building includes seven research floors, potentially accommodating up to 350 research staff and students.

The Kolling's research focuses on 'lifespan' conditions, including:

- pregnancy and childbirth
- cancer and genetics
- kidney and heart disease
- pain and neurological disorders
- diseases of bones and joints
- tissue regeneration

=== Hormones and Cancer Group ===
The Hormones and Cancer Group amalgamated in 2007 from the merging of research laboratories in Cancer Genetics, Functional Genomics and Growth Research. This reorganisation, following the appointment of Professor Bruce Robinson as dean of the Faculty of Medicine, has united the Kolling's major cancer research teams into a single group.

Research focus

- Adrenal Lab
- Bill Walsh Cancer Research Labs
- Cell Signaling Lab
- Cellular and Diagnostic Proteomics Lab
- Cerebral Tumour Lab
- Functional Genomics Lab
- Protein Structure Function Lab
- Thyroid Cancer & Mineral Metabolism Lab
- Tumour Bank
- Tumour Biology Lab

=== The Institute of Bone and Joint Research ===
The Institute of Bone & Joint Research (IBJR) was established in 1999 to provide an Institute devoted to advancing the understanding of disorders and diseases of the musculoskeletal system, their diagnosis and treatments.

At the RNSH, basic and clinical research within the IBJR are presently undertaken in the Departments of Orthopaedics and Rheumatology and their associated laboratories. The IBJR joined the Kolling Institute of Medical Research in 2006.

IBJR primary objectives are:

- To identify the causes of joint destruction in arthritis and to develop surgical and medical treatments which will restore joint structure and function
- To understand the pathophysiology of bone, cartilage and tendon failure in musculoskeletal disorders and devise new approaches for their repair and regeneration
- To identify the factors (inherited, occupational, hormonal, etc.) which contribute to the morbidity of bone and joint disease in the Australian community

Apart from supporting research activities in the above areas, the institute also disseminates recent advances in the understanding of the musculoskeletal sciences by organising regular public seminars and scientific symposia where leading specialists present their latest research findings.

The Bone and Joint group investigates diseases of the bone, cartilage, tendons, ligaments and joints, with particular research interests in osteoarthritis, rheumatoid arthritis, osteoporosis and spinal diseases.

Laboratories in IBJR

- A3BC
- Back Pain Research
- Department of Rheumatology
- Northern Metabolic Bone Centre Trust
- Murray Maxwell Biomechanics Laboratory
- Orthopaedics department
- Osteoarthritis Research
- Raymond Purves Bone and Joint Research Laboratory
- Sutton Arthritis Research Laboratory

=== Cardiology ===
Researches cardiovascular disease with particular strengths in cellular electrophysiology and the use of translational models to understand heart failure and repair mechanisms.

- Cardiac Technology Lab – Head of Research: Prof Stephen Hunyor
- Cardiac Surgery – Head of Research: Dr Ross Smith
- Northern Heart Research Centre – Head of Research: Prof Helge Rasmussen
- Vascular Biology Lab – Head of Research: Dr Michael Ward

=== Clinical medicine ===
Head of research: Dr Greg Fulcher

- Diabetes, Endocrinology, Metabolism & Research
- Sydney Diabetes Education Centre

=== Neurogenetics ===
Headed by Professor Carolyn Sue, the Neurogenetics group studies disease mechanisms involved in inherited neurological disorders with a particular interest in mitochondrial function and movement disorders (e.g. Parkinson's disease).

=== Pain management ===
Established in 1990, the Pain Management Research Institute (PMRI) is a joint initiative between the University of Sydney and Royal North Shore Hospital. PMRI is a division of the Kolling Institute of Medical Research, which has the broad goal of improving human health.

Headed by Professor Michael Cousins, Pain Management aims to develop treatments for a range of severe, persistent pain problems (e.g. due to injury, cancer, inflammation). This involves basic research to understand the structural, molecular and physiological changes in the nervous system, and clinical and epidemiological studies.

PMRI consists of a multidisciplinary group of health professionals and research staff who are collaborating in education and research to improve pain treatment in adults and children.

Staff include:

- Medical specialists in pain medicine, psychiatry, rheumatology, palliative care
- Registered nurses
- Clinical psychologists
- Allied health professionals such as physiotherapists and occupational therapists
- Basic and applied scientists

PMRI works in close collaboration with the Pain Management & Research Centre (PMRC), which treats patients with acute pain, cancer pain, and chronic non-cancer pain. PMRI's internationally recognised research about has improved the lives of thousands of Australians by reducing their acute, chronic and cancer pain. PMRI conducts basic and clinical research programs and also operates a national and international educational program leading to a Masters qualification in Pain Management.

Laboratories:

- Brain, Behaviour & Society Research Lab
- Cellular Physiology Research Lab
- Opioids & Neuropathic Pain Lab
- Peripheral Mechanisms and Injury Lab
- Spinal Cord Pain

=== Renal research ===
Headed by Professor Carol Pollock, Renal Research conducts research into the molecular mechanisms underpinning progressive kidney disease using cell culture models of diabetes and studies of patients with diabetes.

The laboratory uses a number of approaches, including studying the single cell, cells in culture, animal models of diabetes through to studies on people with diabetes. Work from Renal Research has highlighted the parallels between developmental biology and cancer cell biology in progressive kidney disease. In 2007 a key focus of our work has been to elucidate the cellular abnormalities inherent in epithelial to mesenchymal transition (common to cancer cell biology) and the recapitulation of developmental signaling processes in kidney disease.

=== Reproduction and endocrine (perinatal) ===
Headed by Professor Jonathan Morris, Perinatal Research aims to improve the health and wellbeing of mothers and babies through biomedical, clinical and population health research.

=== Deafness research ===
The Sydney Deafness Research Centre (SDRC) is a research facility located on a hospital campus, the Kolling Building, part of the University of Sydney (Northern Campus).

The SDRC team is led by Clinical Associate Professor Nirmal Patel, a surgeon scientist with a particular interest in cochlear implantation. Nirmal is an ear surgeon at the Royal North Shore and North Shore Private Hospitals campus. He spends his non-clinical time with the SDRC team overseeing the research and deafness alleviation programme of the SDRC. Nirmal completed a Master of Surgery by Research Thesis through the New York University/ University of New South Wales in the field of gene and stem cell therapy of the inner ear. Nirmal also actively teaches audiology students, medical students, ENT registrars and audiologists on a weekly basis.

=== Other research areas ===
- Ageing and pharmacology (geriatric pharmacology and hepatology)
- Burns treatment research
- Depression and mood disorders
- Population health research
- Preventative medicine research
- Psychological medicine research
- Quadriplegic hand research
- Regenerative medicine
- Sydney Regenerative Medicine Centre
- Sexual health research

== See also ==
- Health in Australia
