= Elizabeth Vassilieff =

Australian artist, writer and peace activist

Elizabeth Orme Vassilieff, née Sutton (27 September 1915 – 2007) was an Australian artist, writer and peace activist. She initially published under her first married name, Elizabeth Hamill, and later also wrote as Elizabeth Vassilieff-Wolf.

== Life ==
Elizabeth Sutton was born 27 September 1915 in Melbourne, the daughter of A. Leslie Sutton, a Methodist businessman. While still a teenager, in 1934, she married William Hamill, an engineering student, but divorced him in the early 1940s. On 20 March 1947 Hamill married the Russian-born artist Danila Vassilieff, from whom she had bought Stonygrad, the house he had built of stone and logs, and whom she had met only on 5 February. She taught modern art for the Council of Adult Education in 1948-49, and taught modern literature for the University Extension Board. Through the 1940s and 1950s she wrote on art and politics for the literary journal Meanjin, editing its poetry broadsheet and becoming associate editor in 1951. Her critique of Melbourne University Magazine led the poet Vincent Buckley, whose poem 'In Time of Martydom' Vassilieff had used as an example, to complain that she was turning the journal Communist. She also wrote for Voice, Ern Malley's Journal and Overland.

In 1952-53 Vassilieff attended the World Peace Council congress in Vienna, as a delegate of the Victorian Peace Council. with Rev. Victor James and Dr. Clive Sandy. She continued to Moscow and China as a delegate for the Writers Federation, coming back as an enthusiast for socialism in the New China.

Vassilieff exhibited paintings alongside her husband, and their house in Victoria was a focus for left-wing artists and painters such as Nettie and Vance Palmer. Though the pair separated in 1954, Elizabeth continued to try to control his reputation after his death in 1958, claiming copyright ownership and initiating defamation suits against publishers.

Elizabeth Vassilieff married twice more, the last time to the trade unionist Pat Mackie. Her papers are held at the Heide Museum of Modern Art.

== Works ==
- (as Elizabeth Hamill) These Modern Writers: An Introduction for Modern Writers, Melbourne: Georgian House, 1946.
- Peking Moscow Letters: about a four months' journey, to and from Vienna, by way of People's China and the Soviet Union, Melbourne: Australasian Peace Society, 1953.
- Alternative to War: principles and policies of the Australian Peace Council, Melbourne: Australasian Peace Council, 1954.
- (with Pat Mackie) Mount Isa: The story of a dispute, Hawthorn, Victoria: Hudson, 1989.
