= Carlos Augusto León =

Venezuelan writer, historian, politician and scientist

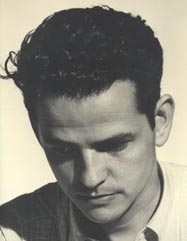
- Born: October 20, 1914; Caracas, Venezuela
- Died: May 13, 1997 (aged 82); Caracas, Venezuela
- Education: Central University of Venezuela
- Occupations: journalist, essayist, poet, politician

Carlos Augusto León Arocha (Caracas, October 20, 1914 – May 13, 1997) was a Venezuelan poet, essayist, historian, politician and scientist.

== Biography ==
He gained a doctorate degree in physical science and mathematics from the Central University of Venezuela in 1936. He also gained a teaching degree in history and geography from the National Pedagogical Institute, and taught for over 5 years at the Andrés Bello Lyceum School in Caracas. In the last twenty years of his employed life he worked as a professor of contemporary literature at the Central University of Venezuela, an institution in which he also served as director of the Department of Publications.

In the second half of his life Augusto Leon was preoccupied with writing poetry and being outspoken in politics, particularly in defense of the common people and disadvantaged social groups. During the dictatorship of General Marcos Pérez Jiménez he was imprisoned and then exiled for a long time. He took advantage of his time in exile by taking his political message and poetic word to many Latin American and European countries. In 1953 he traveled to Russia where he was awarded the World Peace Council Prize. He later returned to Venezuela and held notable political posts, such as City Council member of Caracas and then Senator in the National Congress.

As in his politics, Augusto León's poetry carried a social message, characterized by its defense of the common people.

== Literary Awards ==
- National Prize for Literature (1949) for his poem A solas con la vida.
- Municipal Prize for Prose (1946) for his essay Las piedras mágicas, which pays tribute to the life and work of the Venezuelan writer José Antonio Ramos Sucre.

== Works ==
- Los pasos vivientes (México: Ed. Morelos, 1940)
- Canto de mi país en esta guerra (Caracas: Ed. Suma, 1944)
- Homenaje a Jorge Manrique (Caracas: Ed. Bolívar, 1947)
- Los nombres de la vida (Caracas: Ed. Séneca, 1947)
- La niña de la calavera y otros poemas (Caracas: Litografía del Comercio, 1948)
- A solas con la vida (Caracas: Ed. Ávila Gráfica, 1948)
- Canto a Corea (Caracas: Tipografía Vargas, 1949)
- Canto de paz (Caracas: Ed. Ávila Gráfica, 1950)
- Tres poemas (Caracas: Tipografía Vargas, 1951)
- Poesías (México: Ed. Beatriz de Silva, 1954)
- Solamente el alba (Caracas: Universidad Central de Venezuela, Dirección de Cultura, 1973)
- Una gota de agua (Caracas: Imprenta Universitaria, 1974)
- Los dísticos profundos (Caracas: Ediciones de la Presidencia de la República, 1984)
- Juegos del yo (1989)
