= Otira Methodist Home Missionary Training College =

Former Methodist training institution, Kew

Coordinates: 37.799625°S 145.032485°E

Otira Methodist Home Missionary Training College was a residential college in Victoria, Australia, for training prospective Methodist ministers.

== History ==
"Otira", in Walpole Street, Kew, Victoria was a grand residence on 2.5 acres (1.0 ha), owned by salt tycoon Henry Berry (1842 – 9 January 1923), a devout Methodist. On his death the Methodist church was able to purchase the property at a favorable price, and was left a substantial sum in his will, specifically for the benefit of young trainee Methodist preachers, and by March 1925 already had twelve in residence, studying elementary theology under Rev. A. T. Holden.

Rev. T. C. Rentoul was assistant to Holden and was made principal on Holden's death.
