= Danila Vassilieff =

Russian painter

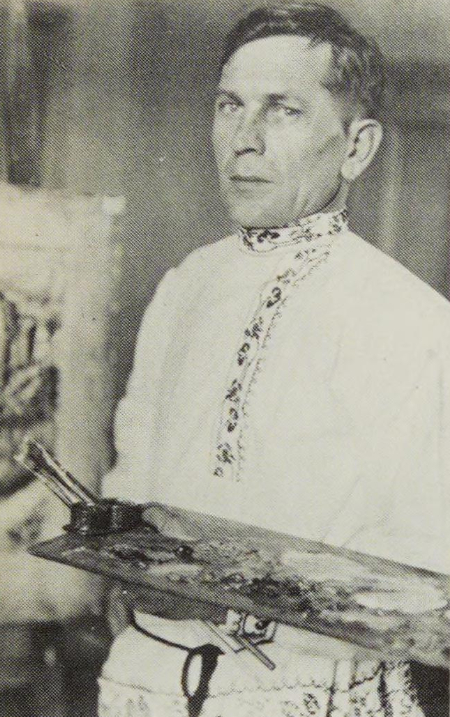
Danila Vassilieff, 1936

Danila Vassilieff (28 December [O.S. 16 December] 1897 – 22 March 1958) was a Russian-born Australian painter and sculptor. He has been called the "father of Australian modernism".

== Life ==
Danila Ivanovich Vassilieff (Данила Иванович Васильев) was born in 1897 at Kagalnitskaya, near Rostov-on-Don, Russia. His father was a Cossack and his mother Ukrainian. He studied mechanical engineering at a technical school at Novocherkassk and at a military academy in Saint Petersburg. During World War I and the Russian Civil War, he served with a Don Cossack cavalry regiment. He was captured by the Red Army at Baku in April 1920, but escaped by motorbike and made his way to China via Armenia, Persia, India and Burma. In May 1923 in Shanghai, he married Anisia Nicolaevna, a fellow refugee. They set out for Australia, arriving in Townsville, Queensland in July.

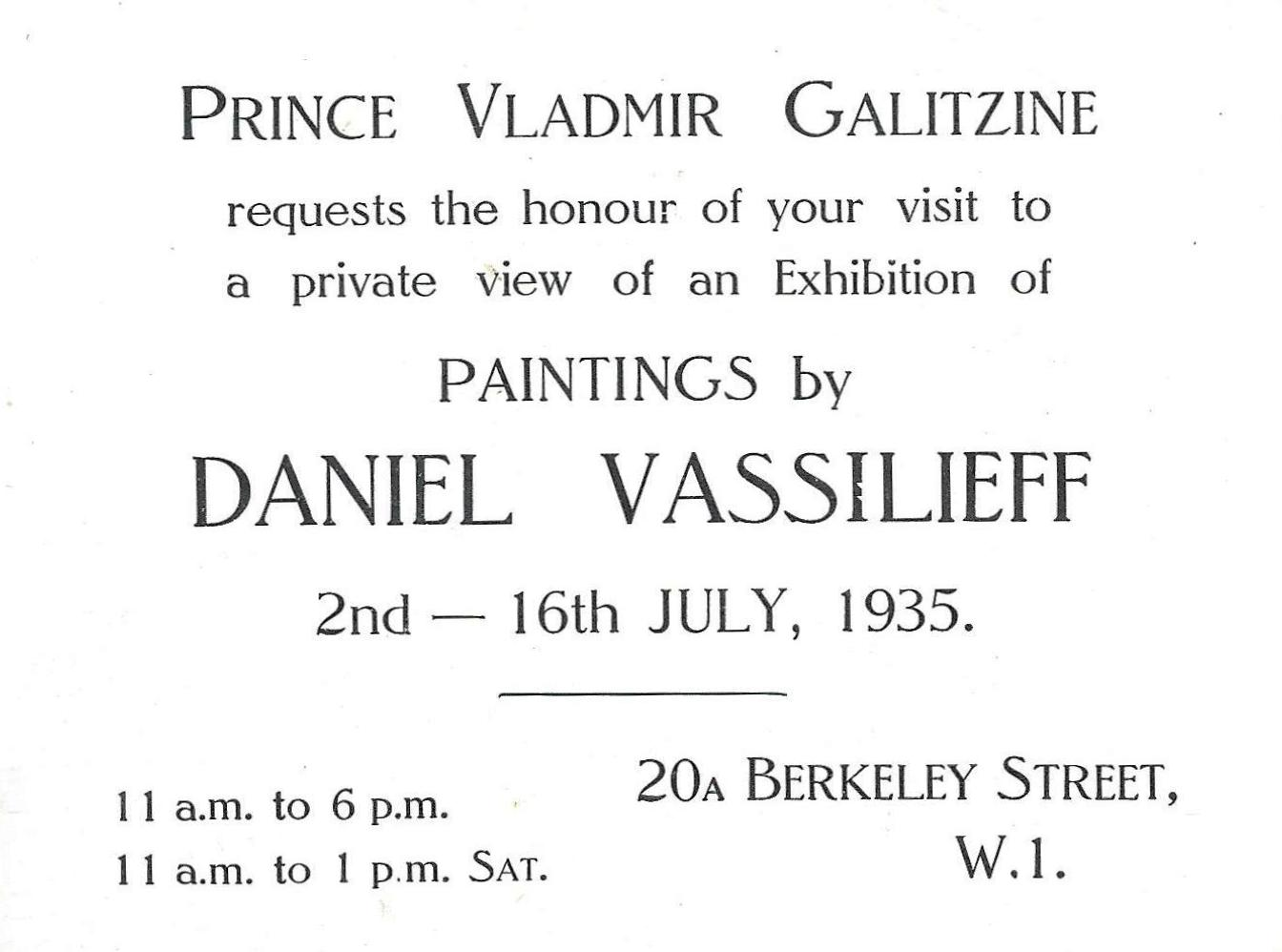

They bought a sugarcane farm at Yuruga, located near Ingham. By 1928, he was working as a railway labourer at Mataranka, Northern Territory. It was there that he began to paint, using a child's paint set. In 1929, he separated from his wife, was naturalised, and left Australia. He travelled to Paris and then on to Rio de Janeiro, Brazil where, in 1930 and 1931, he had his first formal studies in art, under Dimitri Ismailovitch, a specialist in Byzantine mosaics and frescoes. From 1932 to 1935, he worked and exhibited in the West Indies, South America, England, Spain and Portugal.

While living in England, his ideas of using traditional Russian decorative art in a modernist context began to form. That was helped by his friendship with Vladimir Polunin, a teacher at the Slade School of Fine Art, who had previously a scene painter for Sergei Diaghilev's Ballets Russes. Vassilieff wanted to return to Russia, but Stalin's repressive regime made that impossible.

In 1935, when he decided to return to Australia from England, he stored over 50 paintings with his friends the Ogilvies near Bristol. By the outbreak of WWII in 1939 they were in the Ogilvies' attic. With the risk of incendiary bombs, the authorities insisted that most should be burnt, although a number were kept hanging in the Ogilvies' home.

In October 1935, Vassilieff settled in Sydney. He painted inner-city street scenes, still lifes, portraits and landscapes, and exhibited twice at the Macquarie Galleries.

In 1937, he took up with Helen Macdonald, moving to Biloela, Queensland, and then to Melbourne, Victoria. There, his reputation gradually grew. His paintings were often of children playing in the streets of inner suburban Melbourne. Vassilieff mixed in Melbourne's local Russian émigré and artistic circles, and joined the Contemporary Art Society. He was befriended by people of the Heide Circle such as George Bell, Vance and Nettie Palmer, John and Sunday Reed, Arthur Boyd and John Perceval. His style began to influence younger artists such as Albert Tucker, Lina Bryans, Joy Hester, Charles Blackman and Sidney Nolan. This group of artists came to be known collectively as the Angry Penguins, and Vassilieff is now considered their father figure.

In 1939, he became foundation art teacher at the experimental Koornong School, Warrandyte, operated by Clive and Janet Nield. His lover, Helen Macdonald, was a music teacher there. Nearby, he built a house of stone and logs that he named "Stonygrad". That home became a focal point for the Angry Penguins, as well as other local artists. His most supportive critic at that time was Basil Burdett, who was killed in an aircraft crash in 1942.

In 1944, Vassilieff's relationship with Helen Macdonald ended. He decided to sell Stonygrad and move to South Africa, but fell in love with the purchaser, Elizabeth Orme Hamill, née Sutton, a 31-year-old lecturer and a divorcee. Following a belated divorce from his first wife Anisia, he married Hamill in 1947.

Around that time, sculpture began to figure prominently in his output. He quarried Lilydale marble himself, and used power tools for his rough work, but gave his pieces a brilliant finish. In 1953, he became vice-president of the Contemporary Art Society. He and Elizabeth separated in 1954, and he went to Mildura High School as an art teacher, transferring to Swan Hill the following year. He was a keen fisherman and regularly shared this hobby with the Swan Hill High School principal, Fred Wells. He continued to exhibit at the Gallery of Contemporary Art, Melbourne, in 1956 and 1957, but his work was either strongly criticised or not noticed at all. He was transferred to Eltham by the Victorian Education Department, but was sacked for unsatisfactory performance. He returned to Mildura, living in a shack and painting watercolours.

In 1958, aged 60, he died of heart failure while on a visit to "Heide", John and Sunday Reed's property at Bulleen (now the Heide Museum of Modern Art). There was a memorial exhibition in 1959, for which Albert Tucker wrote:

And Vassilieff the man? He was a rich and sombre presence who carried with him the odour of Byzantium and Caucasian Steppes. In his life he expressed the full pathos and loneliness, the violence and tragedy of our human condition ... he was an ikon in the bush, a gift, a mystery that informed us all. ... My wish for you Danila, is that you have found your home at last.

Danila Vassilieff's work is now represented in major Australian galleries.

== Bibliography ==
- Joseph L Davis, The art and messed-up politics of Danila Ivanovich Vassilieff

== Works ==
- At land’s end
- The buffet
- Children in the Street, gouache
- Children Playing in Collingwood School
- Coconut grove (West Indies), oil, signed D. VASSILIEFF 1933, private collection in England
- Dance Girl, gouache
- Drowned sisters
- Expulsion from Paradise, four-part screen (this was long believed lost, but was rediscovered and purchased in 1983 by the National Gallery of Australia
- Fairytale study pair – Shipwreck and sea things
- Fantasia Series (23) Fairytale, watercolour and gouache
- Firebird from Drummoyne
- Fitzroy Life
- Fitzroy street scene
- The Floral Dress, gouache
- Girl on the street
- Gossip (West Indies, probably Haiti), oil, signed D.I.V. H-1933, private collection in England
- Grey Smith, portrait
- Helen
- Helen Wearing a Red Hat, gouache
- Herbert Collingwood, portrait
- Ian Loder, portrait
- John Loder, portrait
- Junction
- Lawrence and Doris Ogilvie dancing (in their home The Dingle, East Dundry, Bristol, England), pencil and watercolour, signed DIV 1934, private collection in England
- Little woman
- Local celebrity
- Mechanical Man, sculpture
- Nameless carving
- Nocturne No. 3, Commonwealth Lane
- Out at sea
- Peter and the Wolf, gouaches
- Petit Bourgeois, sculpture
- The politician
- Portrait of a Woman, gouache
- Production Line Worker, Ordnance Factory, gouache
- Pupil III, Koornang School, gouache
- Railway,
- Red Roses, still life
- Soap Box Derby
- St George and the Dragon, gouache
- Stenka Razin, sculpture
- Street in Surry Hills (Self-Portrait in Cathedral Street)
- Street Scene with Graffiti
- Sunday and Sweeney Reed
- Sunken Wreck
- Three Children
- Two Crows, watercolour and gouache
- Two Leaning Together, gouache
- Unknown Political Prisoner II
- Untitled (two boys and dog)
- Visitor III, gouache
- Warrandyte Bushman, gouache
- Watching the parade I, II
- Woman in Profile, gouache
- Woronora landscape
- Young girl (Shirley)
