= Martha L. Ludwig =

American biochemist

Martha Louis Ludwig
- Born: 16 August 1931; Pittsburgh, Pennsylvania
- Died: 27 November 2006
- Education: Cornell University (BA) (1952) University of California Berkeley (M.A.) (1955) Cornell University Medical College (Ph.D.) (1956)
- Scientific career
- Fields: Biochemistry; X-ray Crystallography
- Workplaces: University of Michigan
- Doctoral advisor: Donald B Melville
- Other academic advisors: William Lipscomb

Martha Ludwig (August 16, 1931 – November 27, 2006) was an American macromolecular crystallographer. She was the J. Lawrence Oncley Distinguished University Professor of Biological Chemistry at the University of Michigan.

== Personal life ==
Ludwig was born on August 16, 1931, in Pittsburgh, Pennsylvania. Her father was Leon Ludwig, a physicist, and her mother was Agnes Sutermeister Ludwig, a worker in the social services. Soon after her birth, her father accepted a job as the director of the Westinghouse facility, resulting in the family move to Buffalo, NY. As a child in school, Ludwig found a passion for mathematical puzzles and hoped to become a scientist in the future.

During her post-doc at Harvard Medical School, Ludwig found her husband of 44 years, Fredric Hoch, M.D. doing research on carboxypeptidase with Bert Vallee. Together, they enjoyed many outdoor activities such as skiing, hiking and bird-watching as well as cooking. Known for her love of crystallography and rigorous teaching style, Ludwig was feared by graduate students. As Cinda-Sue Davis, the current director of the Women in Science and Engineering at the University of Michigan, remarked, “We knew that if Martha was on our preliminary exam committee, she would ask us a question about crystallography.” She taught Biological Chemistry 807, a class modeled after Howard Schachman's physical biochemistry course. Students said that it was one of the most challenging courses they took in graduate school. While her problem sets were among the most challenging, students said that she pushed them and taught them how to think.

Ludwig died in Ann Arbor, Michigan on November 27, 2006, from colon cancer.

== Education ==
Ludwig attended Cornell University and received a B.A. in chemistry in 1952. She received her master's degree in biochemistry in 1955 from the University of California, followed by a Ph.D. in biochemistry from the Cornell Medical College in 1956. While at Cornell, Ludwig conducted her Ph.D. research in biochemistry under Nobel Laureate Vincent du Vigneaud and studied the biosynthesis of ergothionine in D.B. Melville's laboratory.

== Research ==
While studying at Berkeley, Ludwig took Howard Schachman's course in physical biochemistry; she later credited this course with setting the direction for her own research. She completed her Ph.D. thesis on the biosynthesis of ergothionine at Cornell University Medical College, and followed this with postdoctoral studies at Harvard Medical School from 1957 to 1959 and the Massachusetts Institute of Technology from 1959 to 1962. In 1962 Ludwig's interests switched from classical techniques of biochemistry to the then-emerging field of X-ray crystallography and she joined the laboratory of William Lipscomb to work on the structure of carboxypeptidase. Ludwig determined the structure of the enzyme carboxypeptidase A, one of the first enzyme structures to be described.

In 1967, she became an assistant professor in the Department of Biological Chemistry and an assistant research biophysicist in the Biophysics Research Division at the University of Michigan. As a faculty member in the Biophysics Research Division, she joined a group of other faculty including Vincent Massey (enzymologist) and Graham Palmer; focusing on studying flavoproteins. Ludwig focused on studying flavodoxin in her laboratory. In 1969, Ludwig had her first publication which focused on the crystallization of both oxidized and semiquinone forms of protein from Clostridium pasteurianum. Ludwig also worked on superoxide dismutase during the 1980s with James Fee, a colleague from the Biophysics Research Division at the University of Michigan. In 1990, Ludwig continued to collaborate with University of Michigan colleagues including Vincent Massey, to uncover why there was a very low potential associated with the reduction of semiquinone. Ludwig started a collaboration with Richard Swenson from Ohio State University, where they examined the redox state of a flavodoxin from Clostridium beijerinckii.

Her laboratory focused on proteins involved in electron and group transfer reactions; over the next four decades it helped elucidate, amongst others, the structures of flavodoxin, the first flavoprotein structure, iron-superoxide dismutase, p-hydroxybenzoate hydroxylase and phthalate dioxygenase reductase. Ludwig continued close collaborations with faculty studying redox biology at the University of Michigan, resulting in structure determinations of phthalate dioxygenase reductase in collaboration with the laboratory of David Ballou, p-hydroxy-benzoate hydroxylase in collaboration with the laboratories of Ballou and Vincent Massey, thioredoxin reductase in collaboration with the laboratory of Charles Williams Jr., and cobalamin-dependent methionine synthase in collaboration with Rowena Green Matthews.

== Service ==
An important aspect to her career, Ludwig made significant service contributions the University of Michigan. During her time there, she directed the Molecular Biophysics Training Grant and served as the chair of the Biophysics Research Department.

Ludwig was also a mentor to young crystallographers such as Cathy Drennan, a current professor at MIT. Drennan recalls Ludwig being a patient and caring mentor, while also demanding excellence and thoroughness. Ludwig held her students to a high level of thinking and learning, insisting that they know the theory behind every step. She would meet with her students for hours and solve problems together. Instead of promoting her work, she dedicated her time to her students’ learning.

== Awards ==
- Helen Hay Whitney Fellow award
- National Institutes of Health Career Development Award
- Garvan-Olin Medal of the American Chemical Society (1984)
- Distinguished Faculty Achievement Award from the University of Michigan (1986)
- Fellow of the American Association for the Advancement of Science (2001)
- Member of the National Academy of Sciences (2003)
- Member of the Institute of Medicine (2006)
