= Miriam Rossi (chemist) =

Italian-American chemist

- Education: Hunter College; Johns Hopkins University (PhD)
- Scientific career
- Workplaces: Vassar College
- Thesis: Hydrogen bonding, stacking and metal ion interactions in pyrimidine derivatives : some structural studies (1978)
- Academic advisors: Jenny Glusker
- Notable students: Cathy Drennan
- Website: www.vassar.edu/faculty/rossi

Miriam Rossi is an Italian-American chemist and the Mary Landon Sague Chair at Vassar College. She works on X-ray crystallography and chemistry education.

== Early life and education ==
Rossi was born in Italy and moved to New York City as a child. She studied chemistry at Hunter College, where she worked with David Beveridge. She was the first in her family to attain a PhD degree. In fact, her parents, in Italy, had a fourth grade education, the maximum available at the time. Her older brother, Egidio Rossi, is a nephrologist in Parma, Italy. She joined Johns Hopkins University for her doctoral studies, earning a PhD in inorganic chemistry under the supervision of Tom Kistenmacher. She worked on the refinement of 1-methylcytosine.

== Research and career ==
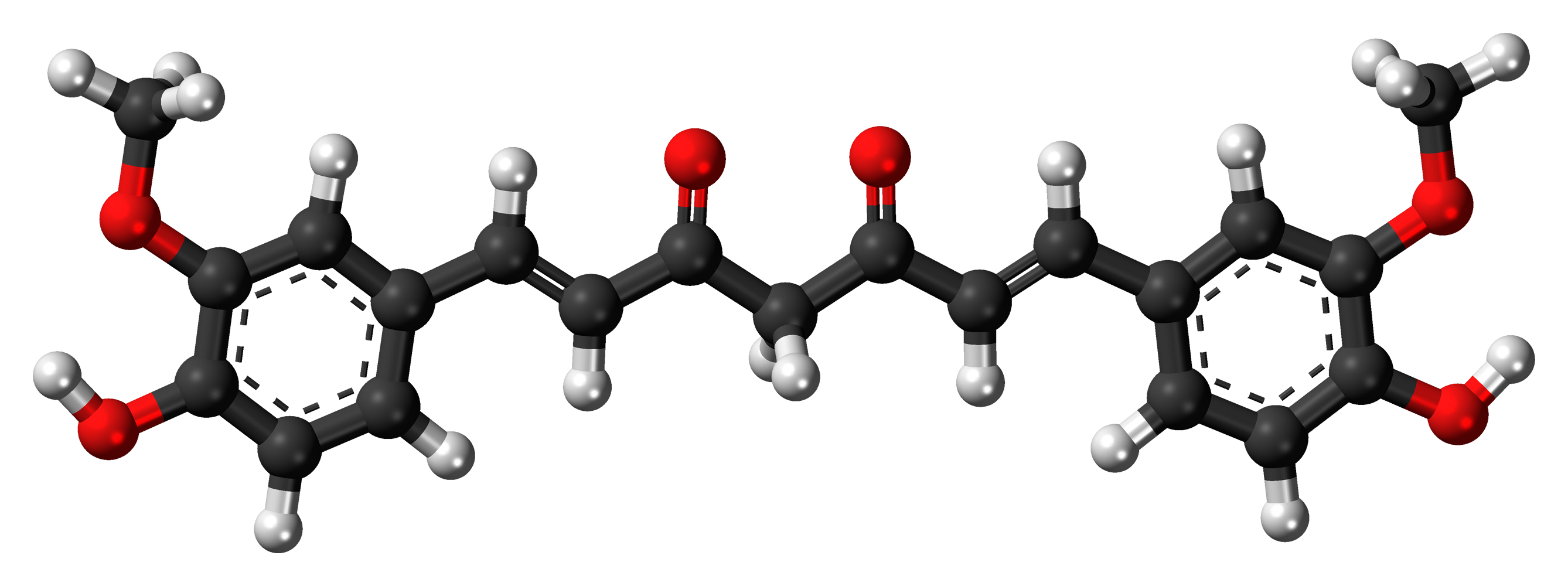
Ball and stick model of a curcumin molecule

Rossi joined the Fox Chase Cancer Center as a postdoctoral fellow with Jenny Glusker. There she determined the structure of methylcobalamin, an active compound of Vitamin B12.

In 1982 Rossi joined Vassar College. She uses X-ray crystallography to study the structure and function of molecules, particularly those with biological activity. She has investigated several biological molecules, including quercetin, curcumin and resveratrol. Rossi identified the bioactivity of curcumin. At Vassar College, Rossi supervised Cathy Drennan and has continued to act as her mentor. She served on the US National Committee for Crystallography and is currently a member of the International Union of Crystallography Commission on Education.

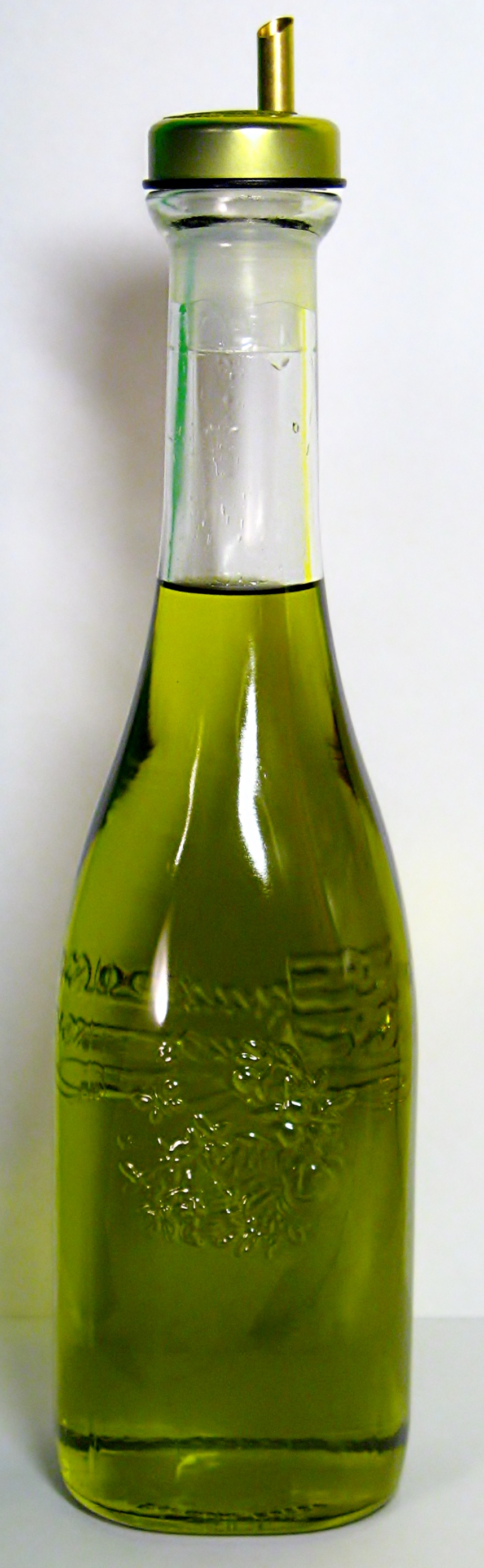
Olive oil in a bottle

Rossi has been involved with teaching crystallography and chemistry throughout her academic career. She is responsible for teaching structural chemistry and biochemistry. At Vassar she led the Culture and Chemistry of Cuisine course. In the class, students learn about fermentation, leavening and the behaviour of starches. She has worked with The Culinary Institute of America on their culinary science program. After being asked to speak about the nutritional benefits of the Mediterranean diet, Rossi became interested in its scientific origins. She collaborated with an olive oil producer in California and found that olive oil limited the growth of tumour cells and had strong antioxidant properties. Working with undergraduate students from Vassar College, Rossi investigated the health-improving properties of goji berries, using X-ray diffraction to determine the structure of β-ionone, emodin and cnidium. She also looked at hispolon, a compound that is found in mushrooms from East Asia. She was made the Mary Landon Sague Professor of Chemistry in 2008.

Rossi worked on initiatives to advance women faculty memberships into leadership positions. She has developed mentoring schemes and cyber networking opportunities. She looked at horizontal peer mentoring for senior women at liberal arts colleges. In 2017 Rossi was named at the Diamond Level of the Mid-Hudson section of the American Chemical Society.

=== Publications ===
- Glusker, Jenny P.; Rossi, Miriam; Lewis, Mitchell (1994). Crystal structure analysis for chemists and biologists. Wiley-VCH. ISBN 978-0-471-18543-7. OCLC 657726822.
- Karukstis, Kerry K.; Gourley, Bridget L.; Rossi, Miriam; Wright, Laura L., eds. (January 2010). "Mentoring Strategies To Facilitate the Advancement of Women Faculty". ACS Symposium Series. 1057. doi:10.1021/bk-2010-1057. ISBN 978-0-8412-2592-3. ISSN 0097-6156.
- Rossi, Miriam (1 October 2018). "Why Are Graphite and Diamond So Different when Both Are Made of Pure Carbon?". Ask the Experts: Chemistry. Scientific American. Archived from the original on 1 October 2018.
