= Edwin C. Webb =

Biochemist

Edwin Clifford Webb

Vice-Chancellor of Macquarie University
- In office 1976–1986
- Preceded by: Alexander George Mitchell
- Succeeded by: Dianne Yerbury

Personal details
- Born: 21 May 1921 Dorset, England
- Died: 17 January 2006 (aged 84)
- Education: Clare College, Cambridge
- Occupation: Academic
- Profession: Biochemist
- Known for: Enzymes (with Malcolm Dixon, four editions), Coordinating the IUBMB enzyme list

Edwin Clifford Webb (21 May 1921 – 17 January 2006) was a British biochemist.

== Life and career ==
Webb was born in Dorset and educated at Poole Grammar School and Clare College, Cambridge, where he studied nerve gases and graduated with a first-class BA in Natural Sciences in 1942. He remained at Cambridge for his doctorate, where he was a Beit Fellow. There he worked in the laboratory of Malcolm Dixon, collaborating with him in the study of enzymes. Together, they wrote a classic textbook on the subject, Enzymes, which was first published by Longmans in 1958, Webb subsequently took a chair in biochemistry at the University of Queensland but continued to collaborate with Dixon on further editions. In 1970, he became the deputy vice-chancellor at Queensland and in 1975 he became the second vice-chancellor of Macquarie University. He retired in 1986 but continued to work on the enzyme list of the International Union of Biochemistry and Molecular Biology (IUBMB) while living in Townsville.

== Research ==
=== Cambridge ===
Webb's first paper was written with Kenneth Bailey on yeast pyrophosphatase, the first of many papers on enzymes. It was followed by several papers on nerve gases, for example on British anti-lewisite with Ruth van Heyningen. Research collaboration with Malcolm Dixon began with a study of phosphotransferases, and continued with other work, both theoretical and experimental.

=== Queensland ===
After moving to Queensland Webb collaborated with Burt Zerner on Jack bean urease, starting with a study of its purification and assay, followed by other papers on the same enzyme. He also worked with Zerner on other enzymes, including carboxylesterases.

=== Nomenclature ===
Webb's interest in biochemical nomenclature started early in his career, and after the IUBMB compilation was published for the last time as a printed book he wrote a retrospective article about it.
