= Rowena Green Matthews =

American biochemist emeritus

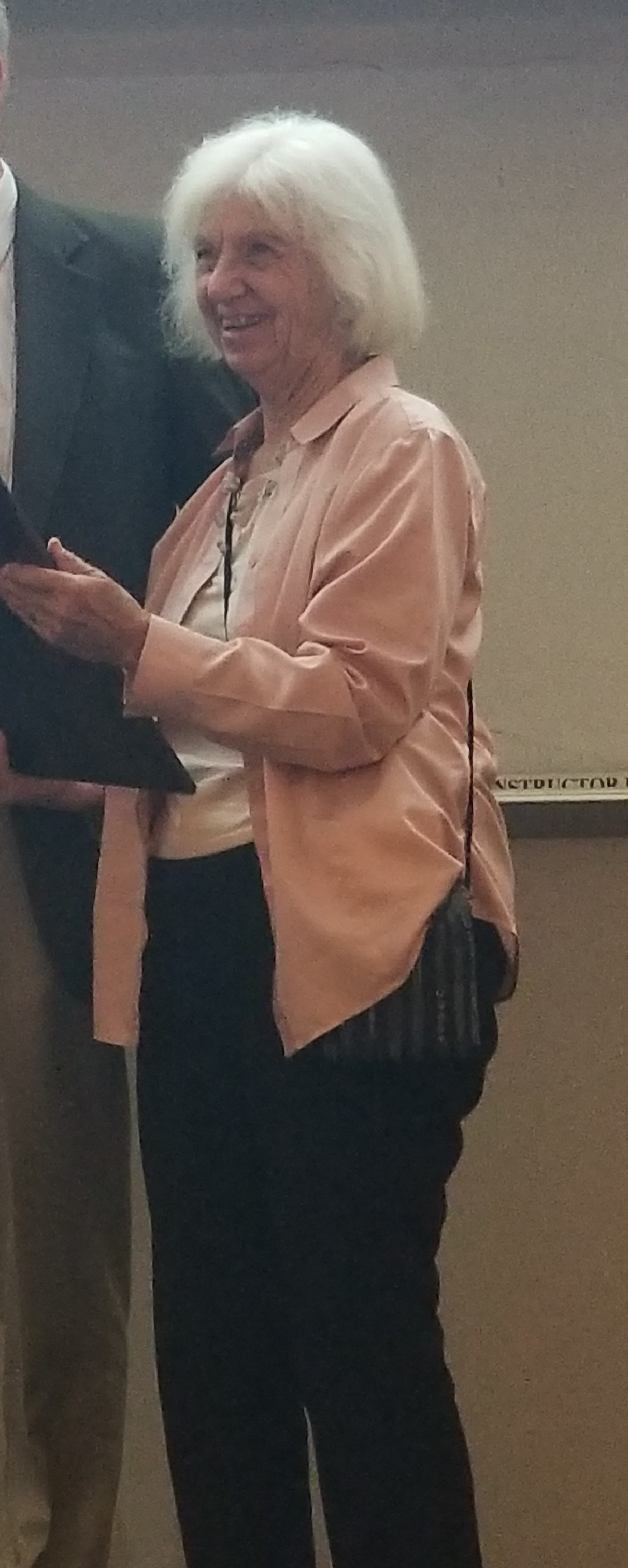
- Born: Rowena Green; 1938 (age 87–88); Cambridge, England
- Education: University of Michigan
- Known for: Studies of cobalamin and folic acid
- Father: David E. Green
- Scientific career
- Fields: Biochemistry
- Workplaces: University of Michigan
- Doctoral advisor: Vincent Massey

Rowena Green Matthews (born 1938) is the G. Robert Greenberg Distinguished University professor emeritus at the University of Michigan, Ann Arbor. Her research focuses on the role of organic cofactors as partners of enzymes catalyzing difficult biochemical reactions, especially folic acid and cobalamin (vitamin B12). Among other honors, she was elected to the National Academy of Sciences in 2002 and the Institute of Medicine in 2004.

== Early life and education ==
Matthews was born in Cambridge, England, while her father, biochemist David E. Green, was on sabbatical there. Matthews earned her B.A. in biology summa cum laude from Radcliffe College in 1960. As an undergraduate, and for three years thereafter, she worked with George Wald studying a new intermediate in the bleaching of the visual pigment rhodopsin that temporally coincided with initiation of visual excitation. She then attended graduate school in biophysics at the University of Michigan, with dissertation research in the laboratory of Vincent Massey. She received her Ph.D. in 1969.

== Academic career ==
After finishing her Ph.D., Matthews remained at the University of Michigan as a postdoctoral fellow in the laboratory of Charles Williams in the department of Biological Chemistry and Assistant Research Scientist in the Biophysics Research Division in 1978. She was promoted to Associate Professor in 1981 became a full professor in 1986, and became the G. Robert Greenberg Distinguished University Professor in 1995. In 2002, she assumed the position of Senior Research Professor and Charter Faculty Member of the Life Sciences Institute. She retired in 2007, assuming professor emeritus status.

== Awards ==
She received numerous recognitions and honors during her career, the Repligen award given by the ACS (2001), election to the National Academy of Sciences (2002), the American Academy of Microbiology (2002), the Institute of Medicine (2004), the American Academy of Arts and Sciences (2005), and the American Philosophical Society (2009). She received the William C. Rose Award given by the American Society for Biochemistry and Molecular Biology in 2000 and the Repligen Corporation Award in Chemistry of Biological Processes given by the American Chemical Society in 2001.

She was the Frederick Gowland Hopkins Lecturer at 12th International Conference of Pteridines and Folates in 2001, an honor she particularly appreciated because her father had worked with Hopkins. She serves on the Medical Advisory Board of the Howard Hughes Medical Institute, and has served on the Council of the National Academy of Sciences.

The University of Michigan hosts a professorship honoring Matthews; since 2009 James Bardwell has held the Rowena G. Matthews Collegiate Professorship.

== Research ==
Dr. Matthew's research focused on one-carbon metabolism, with particular emphasis on the enzymes that catalyze the de novo generation of methyl groups: methionine synthase, a B-12 dependent enzyme in humans, and methylenetetrahydrofolate reductase. Her collaboration with geneticist Rima Rozen at McGill University led to the cloning of human methylenetetrahydrofolate reductase and the characterization of the C677T polymorphism associated with hyperhomocysteinemia in humans. The polymorphism can lead to a high amount of homocysteine in the bloodstream. High concentrations of homocysteine in the plasma can increase the risk for cardiovascular diseases and the use of folic acid have been shown to decrease the amounts in humans. In collaboration with Prof. Martha Ludwig they elucidated the first X-ray structure of vitamin B12 bound to a protein, cobalamin-dependent methionine synthase.

== Selected publications ==
- A love affair with vitamins (2009)
- Cobalamin- and corrinoid-dependent enzymes
- Cobalamin-dependent and cobamide-dependent methyltransferases (2008)

== Personal life ==
Matthews is the eldest daughter of biochemist David E. Green and the aunt of United States Senator Tammy Baldwin.

Matthews Husband Larry Stanford Matthews died Nov. 27, 2021, in Tucson, Arizona, at age 84.
