= Vincent Massey (enzymologist) =

Australian biochemist and enzymologist

- Born: November 28, 1926; Berkeley, New South Wales, Australia
- Died: August 26, 2002 (aged 75)
- Education: University of Sydney (B.S., 1947); University of Cambridge (Ph.D., 1953)
- Known for: Flavin enzymology
- Spouse: Margot Grünewald
- Awards: Humboldt Award (1973)
- Scientific career
- Fields: Enzymology
- Institutions: McMaster Laboratory C.S.I.R.O.; Henry Ford Hospital; University of Sheffield; The University of Michigan
- Thesis: Studies on the Enzyme, Fumarase (1953)
- Doctoral advisor: Malcolm Dixon
- Doctoral students: Rowena G. Matthews, David Ballou
- Website: web.archive.org/web/20160304142132/http://www.bioc.rice.edu/~graham/Massey/VM.html

Vincent Massey (November 28, 1926 – August 26, 2002) was an Australian biochemist and enzymologist best known for his contributions to the study of flavoenzymes. He was elected to the National Academy of Sciences in 1995 for his use of physical biochemistry to relate flavin chemistry to flavin enzymology.

== Biography ==
=== Family life ===
Massey grew up in a family of fishermen in a small village outside of Berkeley in New South Wales, Australia. Massey became interested in science in high school, to the point of performing home chemistry experiments. He was the first in his family to go to university and he obtained a Bachelor of Science from the University of Sydney in biochemistry in 1947.

He met his wife Margot, a survivor of the Holocaust, while he was working at a government laboratory Commonwealth Scientific and Industrial Research Organisation (CSIRO) as a research biochemist. They married during his time there and left for the University of Cambridge in 1950, never returning to Australia. Vincent and his wife had three children.

=== Academic career ===
After obtaining a B.S. in biochemistry from the University of Sydney, Massey worked as a research biochemist for the CSIRO. He worked there for three years, and in that time published five papers on the inhibition of the TCA cycle in nematodes by fluoroacetate. The CSIRO awarded him with a fellowship that would allow him to pursue his doctoral degree at the University of Cambridge.

Massey did his thesis work with Malcolm Dixon. His thesis project revolved around the enzyme fumarase (not a flavoprotein), for example a study of the effects of temperature. However, Massey was exposed to flavins in the lab through working with other students. After completing his thesis, he moved to the United States for a summer to work with Robert A. Alberty at the University of Wisconsin-Madison. Here, he continued studying fumarase and published in 1954 possibly the first thorough paper studying steady-state kinetics of an enzyme as a function of pH.

A colleague from Cambridge, Tom Singer, had accepted a position at the Henry Ford Hospital in Detroit and recruited Massey to work with him to investigate the enzyme succinate dehydrogenase. Singer had recently discovered that FAD was covalently bound to the enzyme. This started Massey's career on flavins and flavoproteins.

In 1957, Massey returned to England to be a lecturer at the University of Sheffield in the Biochemistry Department. By 1961, he was promoted to senior lecturer. In 1963, Massey changed his career path and took a professorship position the University of Michigan in Ann Arbor. Massey was awarded the Henry Russel Lectureship in 1995, the highest recognition given to faculty members at the University of Michigan.

His major scientific contributions include the identification and kinetic characterization of lipoamide dehydrogenase and pioneering the methods of stopped-flow and rapid-freeze electron paramagnetic resonance (EPR) to study enzyme mechanisms. He published over 400 papers and at least an additional 50 book chapters, symposia or reviews, for example on artificial flavins as mechanistic probes. He also had a significant mentoring role; his students included Graham Palmer, Charles H. Williams, Rowena G. Matthews, on NADPH dehydrogenase ("old yellow enzyme"), David P. Ballou, and Paul Engel on butyryl-CoA dehydrogenase, among others.

== Scientific achievements ==
- I.C.I. Fellow, University of Cambridge (1953-1955)
- Guest Lecturer, University of Illinois (1960)
- Teacher, Marine Biological Laboratory, Woods Hole, Massachusetts (1962)
- A.S.B.C. Lecturer (1963)
- Humboldt Award (1973)
- University of Konstanz, Fachbereich Biologie, Konstanz, West Germany, Guest Professor (1973-1974)
- Permanent Guest Professor, University of Konstanz, West Germany (1975- )
- Senior Fellow, Michigan Society of Fellows (1975-1980)
- Elected Fellow of Royal Society of London (1977)
- Biomedical Research Council Distinguished Faculty Lectureship, University of Michigan (1979)
- Distinguished Faculty Achievement Award, The University of Michigan (1983)
- Visiting Professor Institute of Applied Biochemistry, Mitake, Japan (1985)
- Visiting Professor, Yokohama City University School of Medicine, Japan (1988)
- Henry Russel Lecturer University of Michigan (1995)
- National Academy of Sciences Member, Biochemistry (1995)
- J. Lawrence Oncley Distinguished University Professorship (1995- )
- Michigan Scientist of the Year (1998)
- Jubilee Lecture and Harden Medal, Biochemical Society of Great Britain (1999)
