= Ruth van Heyningen =

British biochemist (1917–2019)

- Born: Ruth Eleanor Treverton; 26 October 1917; Newport, Wales
- Died: 24 October 2019 (aged 101)
- Education: University of Cambridge; University of Oxford
- Spouse: William "Kits" van Heyningen
- Children: 2
- Scientific career
- Fields: Biochemistry
- Institutions: University of Oxford
- Doctoral advisor: Joseph Weiner
- Other academic advisors: Robin Hill, Malcolm Dixon, Antoinette Pirie

Ruth Eleanor van Heyningen (née Treverton; 26 October 1917 – 24 October 2019) was a British biochemist, recognized for her research on the biochemistry of the lens and of cataracts.

== Biography ==
Ruth Eleanor Treverton was born in 1917 in Newport, Monmouthshire, Wales. Her parents were Alan Treverton-Jones, a ship-owner, and Mildred (nee Garrod Thomas). Her father died when she was aged six. She attended Cheltenham Ladies’ College. In 1940, she graduated with a degree in biochemistry from Newnham College, Cambridge. She married William "Kits" van Heyningen (who was doing a PhD in the same department) that year. They had two children, Simon and Joanna.

Van Heyningen began doctoral studies under the mentorship of biochemists Robin Hill and Malcolm Dixon. However, due to the classified nature of her work (it was on the effect of poison gases on metabolically important enzymes, and this was during World War II), she was unable to publish her research and complete her degree. She and her family moved to London, where she took a job at the Lister Institute, researching blood group antigens.

In 1947, the family moved to Oxford. Shortly thereafter, van Heyningen began working on a DPhil in the anatomy department, under the supervision of Joseph Weiner. Her doctoral thesis, completed in 1951, was on the composition of sweat.

In 1951, she joined the Nuffield Laboratory of Ophthalmology at the University of Oxford, and conducted research in collaboration with laboratory director Antoinette Pirie. She earned a master's degree in 1952. She then served as a research assistant (1952-1969) and as a senior research officer (1969-1977). In the laboratory, her research focused on the biochemistry of the lens, in particular the biochemical pathways involved in the formation of cataracts. Pirie and van Heyningen co-authored Biochemistry of the Eye, published in 1956.

Van Heyningen is credited with discovering novel pathways (such as the sorbitol pathway) involved in cataract formation, as well as pioneering novel techniques to identify relevant compounds and their interactions. For example, by examining the lenses of diabetic and non-diabetic patients (collected post-surgery or post-portem), she demonstrated that monosaccharide sugars accumulate in the lenses of diabetic patients, generating sugar alcohols that are harmful to the lens. She also conducted research on the role of tryptophan metabolism in the development of cataracts. In 1973, van Heyningen was awarded a DSc from Oxford. In 1976, the Association for Research in Vision and Ophthalmology presented her with its Proctor Medal, citing her "important contributions to our understanding of the lens and cataract".

Van Heyningen was a founding fellow of St. Cross College at the University of Oxford. She remained active in her field of research even after her official retirement in the late 1960s, publishing 20 further articles until 1998. She died in 2019, two days before her 102nd birthday.
