= Tammy Baldwin =

American politician and lawyer (born 1962)

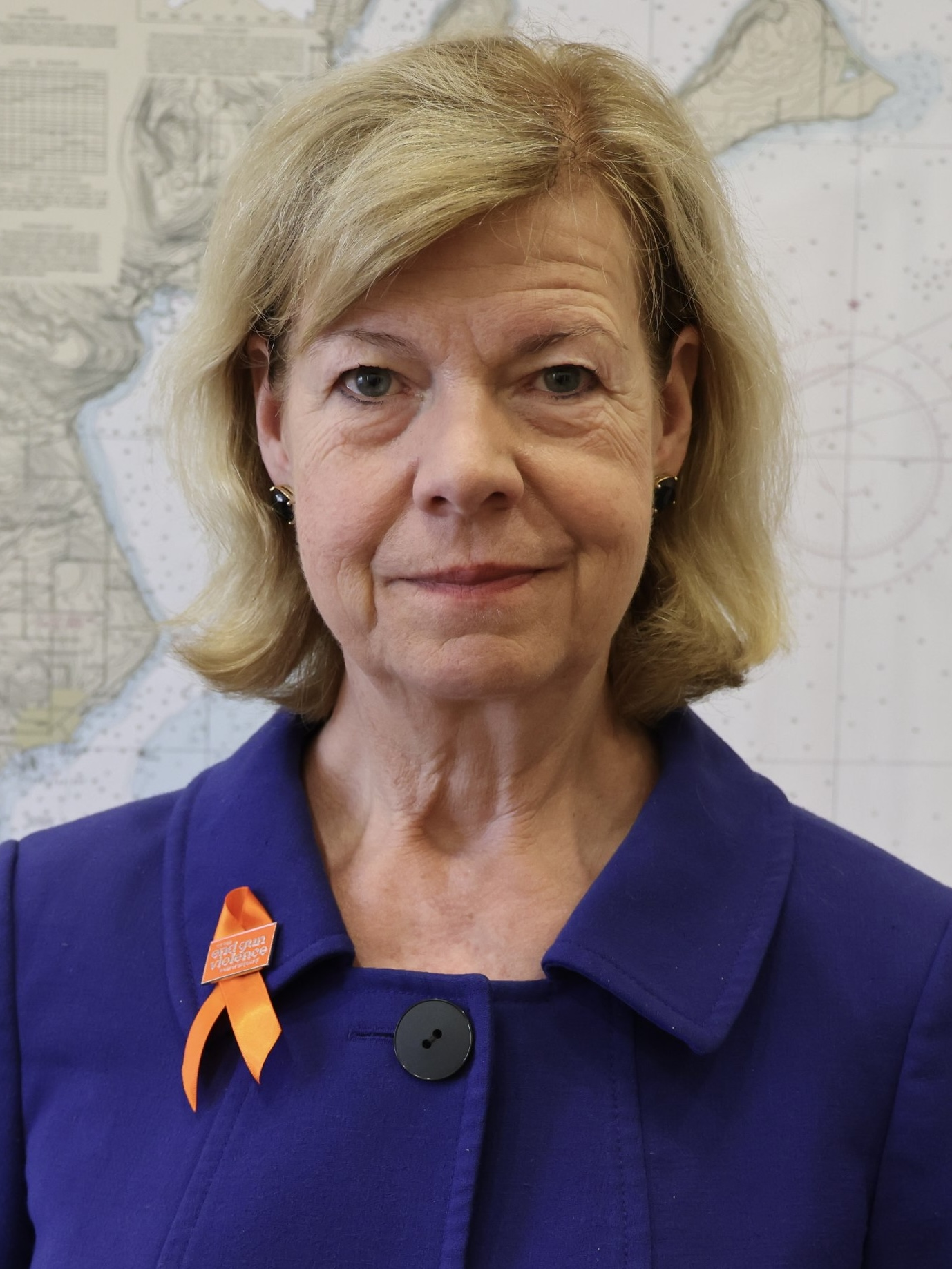
- Baldwin in 2023

Secretary of the Senate Democratic Caucus
- Incumbent
- Assumed office January 3, 2017
- Leader: Chuck Schumer
- Preceded by: Patty Murray

United States Senator from Wisconsin
- Incumbent
- Assumed office January 3, 2013 Serving with Ron Johnson
- Preceded by: Herb Kohl

Member of the U.S. House of Representatives from Wisconsin's 2nd district
- In office January 3, 1999 – January 3, 2013
- Preceded by: Scott Klug
- Succeeded by: Mark Pocan

Member of the Wisconsin State Assembly from the 78th district
- In office January 3, 1993 – January 3, 1999
- Preceded by: David Clarenbach
- Succeeded by: Mark Pocan

Member of the Dane County Board of Supervisors from the 8th district
- In office April 15, 1986 – January 3, 1993
- Preceded by: Lynn Haanen
- Succeeded by: Scott McCormick

Personal details
- Born: Tammy Suzanne Green Baldwin; February 11, 1962 (age 64) Madison, Wisconsin, U.S.
- Party: Democratic
- Domestic partner: Lauren Azar (1998–2010)
- Relatives: David E. Green (grandfather); Rowena Green Matthews (aunt); Andy Samberg (third cousin)
- Education: Smith College (BA); University of Wisconsin–Madison (JD)
- Website: Senate website Campaign website
- Baldwin's voice Baldwin on sexual assault in the U.S. military. Recorded November 19, 2013

Tammy Suzanne Green Baldwin (born February 11, 1962) is an American politician and lawyer serving since 2013 as the junior United States senator from Wisconsin. A member of the Democratic Party, she has also served as the secretary of the Senate Democratic Caucus since 2017. Baldwin has been the dean of the United States congressional delegation from Wisconsin since 2023, when Representative Ron Kind retired.

Baldwin graduated from Smith College and the University of Wisconsin Law School, and was a lawyer in private practice before entering the Wisconsin State Assembly in 1993. She served three terms from Wisconsin's 78th Assembly district from 1993 to 1999, and seven terms as the United States congresswoman from Wisconsin's 2nd congressional district from 1999 to 2013. She was elected to the United States Senate in 2012, and reelected in 2018 and 2024.

Baldwin is the first openly lesbian woman elected to the Wisconsin State Assembly (1993), the first openly lesbian woman and first woman elected to the U.S. House from Wisconsin (1998), and the first openly LGBTQ person and first woman elected to the U.S. Senate from Wisconsin (2012). She has a progressive voting record on healthcare, reproductive rights, and LGBT rights.

== Early life, education, and early career ==
Baldwin was born and raised in Madison, Wisconsin. Her mother, who died in 2017, was 19 and going through a divorce when Baldwin was born. Baldwin was raised by her grandparents and spent Saturdays with her mother, who suffered from mental illness and opioid addiction. Her maternal grandfather, biochemist David E. Green, was Jewish (the son of immigrants from Russia and Germany), and her maternal grandmother, who was Anglican, was English-born. Baldwin's aunt is biochemist Rowena Green Matthews. Through her maternal grandfather, Baldwin is a third cousin of comedian Andy Samberg.

Baldwin graduated from Madison West High School in 1980 as the class valedictorian. She earned a Bachelor of Arts from Smith College in 1984 and a Juris Doctor from the University of Wisconsin Law School in 1989.

Baldwin has worked as an attorney in private practice. Before entering state politics, she first held political office in 1986, when she was elected to the Board of supervisors for Dane County, Wisconsin. She served on the board until 1994. She also served one year on the Madison Common Council to fill a vacancy.

== Wisconsin Assembly (1993–1999) ==
Baldwin ran to represent Wisconsin's 78th Assembly district in central Madison in 1992. She won the Democratic primary with 43% of the vote. In the general election, Baldwin defeated Labor and Farm Party nominee Mary Kay Baum and Republican nominee Patricia Hevenor, 59–23–17%. She was one of just six openly gay political candidates nationwide to win a general election that year.

Baldwin was reelected with 76% of the vote in 1994. She was reelected to a third term with 71% of the vote in 1996.

Committee assignments:

- Criminal Justice Committee
- Education Committee (chair)
- Elections, Constitutional Law and Corrections Committee

== U.S. House of Representatives (1999–2013) ==
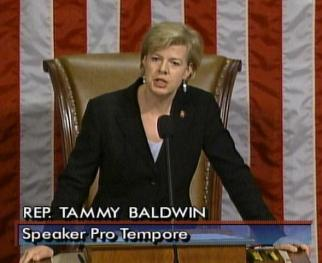
Baldwin presiding over the House while serving as Speaker Pro Tempore, 2007

=== Elections ===
In 1998, U.S. Congressman Scott Klug of the 2nd district, based in Madison, announced he would retire, prompting Baldwin to run for the seat. Baldwin's ads leaned into the fact that Wisconsin had never sent a woman to Congress, and many of her ads targeted younger voters. She won the Democratic primary with a plurality of 37% of the vote. In the general election, she defeated Republican nominee Josephine Musser, 53–47%. Baldwin's campaign drew strong turnout in Dane County, using a team of volunteers, many of whom were students. The turnout was said to have helped Russ Feingold's reelection campaign that year, and was acknowledged by Feingold as a factor.

Baldwin is the first woman elected to Congress from Wisconsin. She is also the first openly gay non-incumbent elected to the House of Representatives, and the first open lesbian elected to Congress. She and Representative Barney Frank co-founded the Congressional LGBTQ+ Equality Caucus in 2008.

In 2000, Baldwin was reelected, defeating Republican nominee John Sharpless by 8,902 votes (51%–49%). She lost eight of the district's nine counties, but carried the largest, Dane County, with 55% of the vote.

After the 2000 census, the 2nd district was made significantly more Democratic in redistricting. Baldwin won reelection to a third term in the newly redrawn 2nd district with 66% of the vote against Republican Ron Greer. In 2004, she beat Dave Magnum 63–37%. She won a 2006 rematch against Magnum, again winning 63–37%. In 2008, she defeated Peter Theron 69–31%, and in 2010 she won a seventh term with 62% of the vote against Chad Lee.

=== Committee assignments ===
- Committee on Energy and Commerce
  - Subcommittee on Environment and Economy
  - Subcommittee on Health

== U.S. Senate (2013–present) ==
=== Elections ===
==== 2012 ====
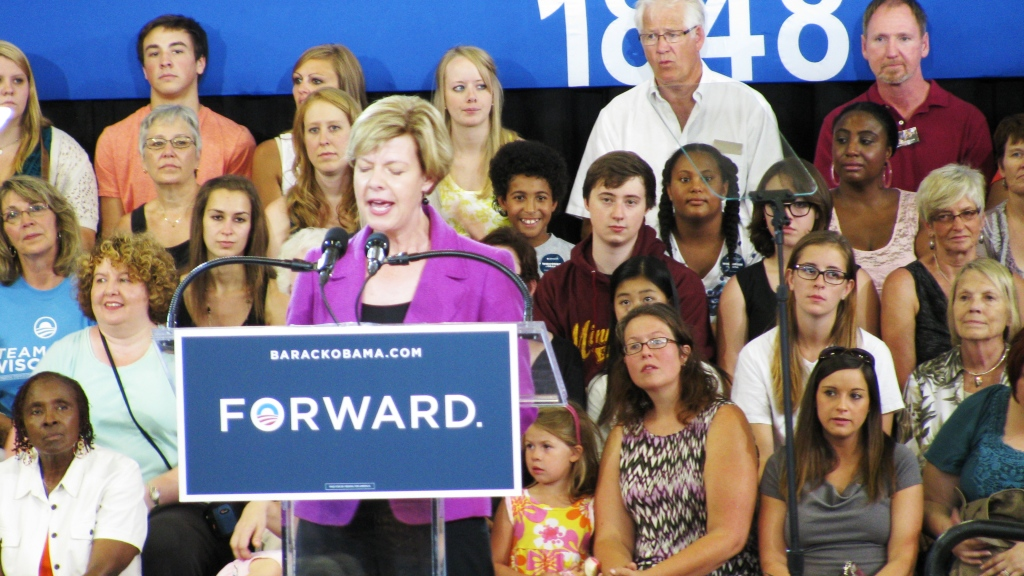
Baldwin campaigning in 2012

Baldwin ran as the Democratic nominee against Republican nominee Tommy Thompson, who had formerly been governor and Secretary of Health and Human Services. She announced her candidacy on September 6, 2011, in a video emailed to supporters. She ran uncontested in the primary election, and spoke at the 2012 Democratic National Convention about tax policy, campaign finance reform, and equality in the United States.

She was endorsed by Democracy for America, and she received campaign funding from EMILY's List, the Gay & Lesbian Victory Fund, and LPAC. Baldwin was endorsed by the editorial board of The Capital Times, who wrote that "Baldwin's fresh ideas on issues ranging from job creation to health care reform, along with her proven record of working across lines of partisanship and ideology, and her grace under pressure mark her as precisely the right choice to replace retiring U.S. Senator Herb Kohl".

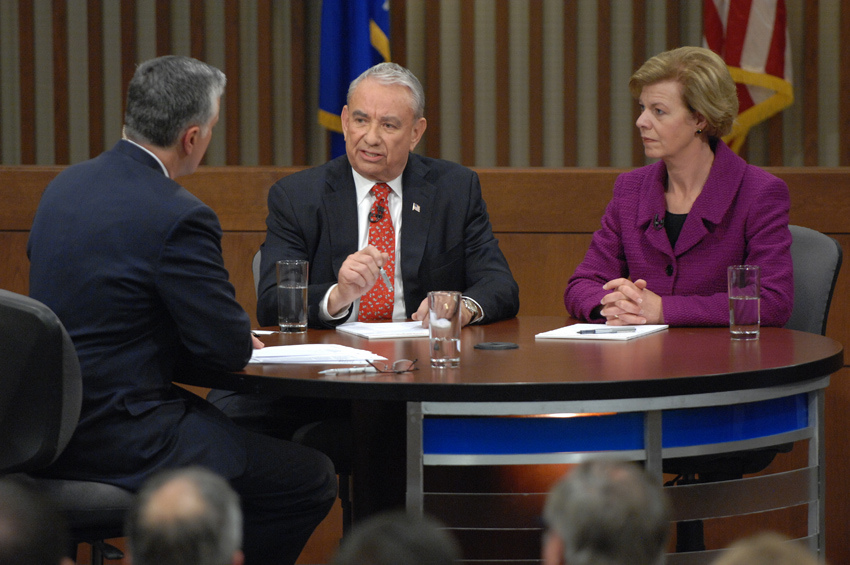
Baldwin and Thompson debating during the 2012 election

Thompson said during the campaign that Baldwin's "far-left approach leaves this country in jeopardy". The candidates had three debates, on September 28, October 18, and October 26. According to Baldwin's Federal Election Commission filings, she raised about $12 million, over $5 million more than Thompson.

On November 6, 2012, Baldwin became the first openly gay candidate to be elected to the U.S. Senate, with 51.4% of the vote. Because of her 14 years in the House of Representatives, under Senate rules she had the highest seniority in her entering class of senators. She was succeeded in Congress by State Representative Mark Pocan, who had earlier succeeded her in the state legislature.

Baldwin was featured in Time's November 19, 2012, edition, in the Verbatim section, where she was quoted as saying "I didn't run to make history" on her historic election. In a separate section, she was also mentioned as a new face to watch in the Senate.

==== 2018 ====
Baldwin won a second term in 2018 with 55.4% of the vote, defeating Republican Leah Vukmir by a margin of approximately 11%.

==== 2024 ====
In April 2023, Baldwin announced her intention to run for a third Senate term. She narrowly defeated Republican nominee Eric Hovde even as Republican presidential nominee Donald Trump won Wisconsin.

=== Committee assignments ===
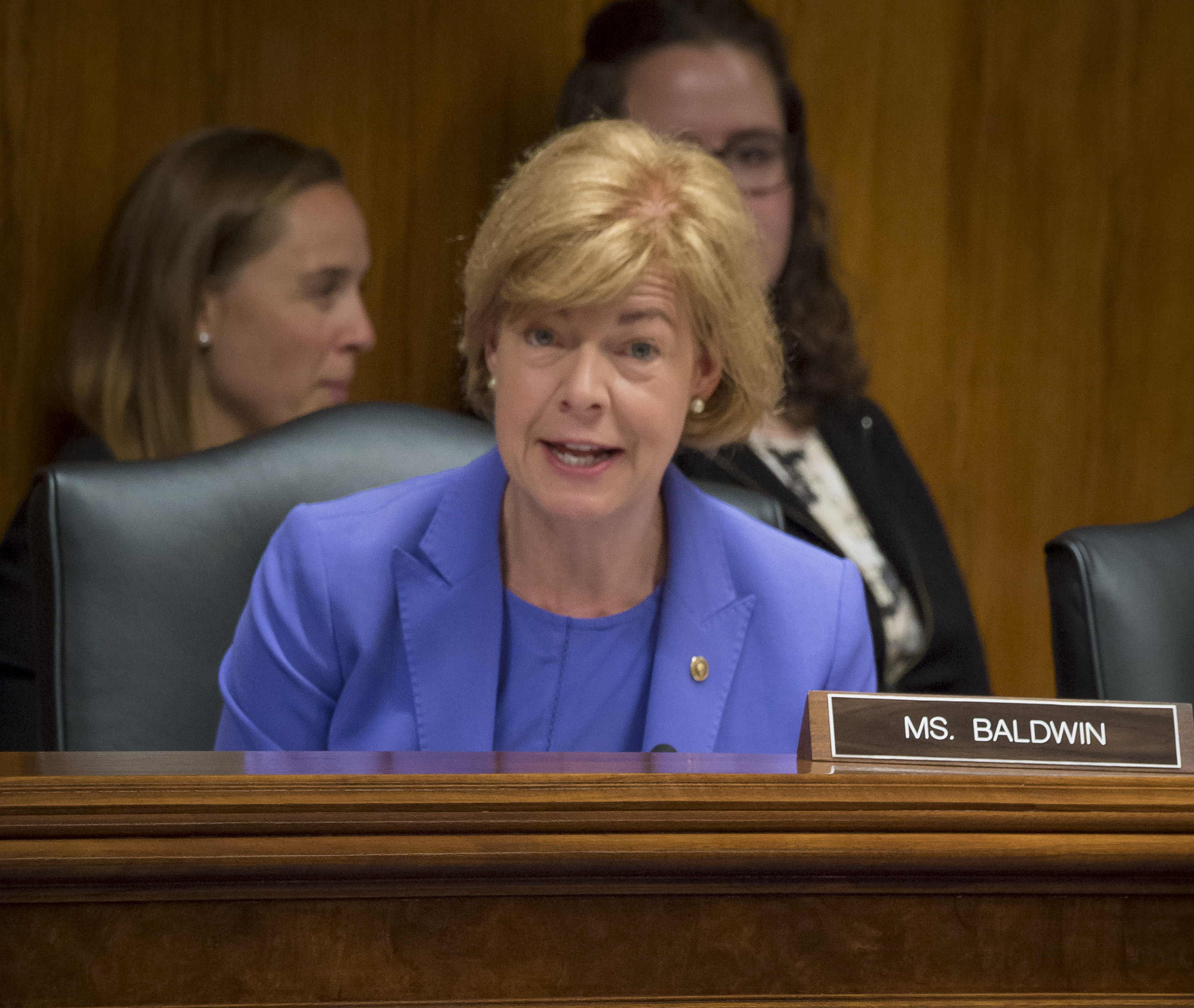
Baldwin questions the Secretary of Agriculture while on the Senate Appropriations Committee, 2017.

- Committee on Appropriations
  - Subcommittee on Agriculture, Rural Development, Food and Drug Administration, and Related Agencies
  - Subcommittee on Defense
  - Subcommittee on Energy and Water Development
  - Subcommittee on Labor, Health and Human Services, Education, and Related Agencies (Ranking Member)
  - Subcommittee on Military Construction, Veterans Affairs, and Related Agencies
- Committee on Commerce, Science, and Transportation
  - Subcommittee on Consumer Protection, Technology, and Data Privacy
  - Subcommittee on Coast Guard, Maritime, and Fisheries
  - Subcommittee on Science, Manufacturing, and Competitiveness (Ranking Member)
- Committee on Health, Education, Labor, and Pensions
  - Subcommittee on Employment and Workplace Safety
  - Subcommittee on Primary Health and Retirement Security

=== Caucus memberships ===
- Black Maternal Health Caucus

== Political positions ==
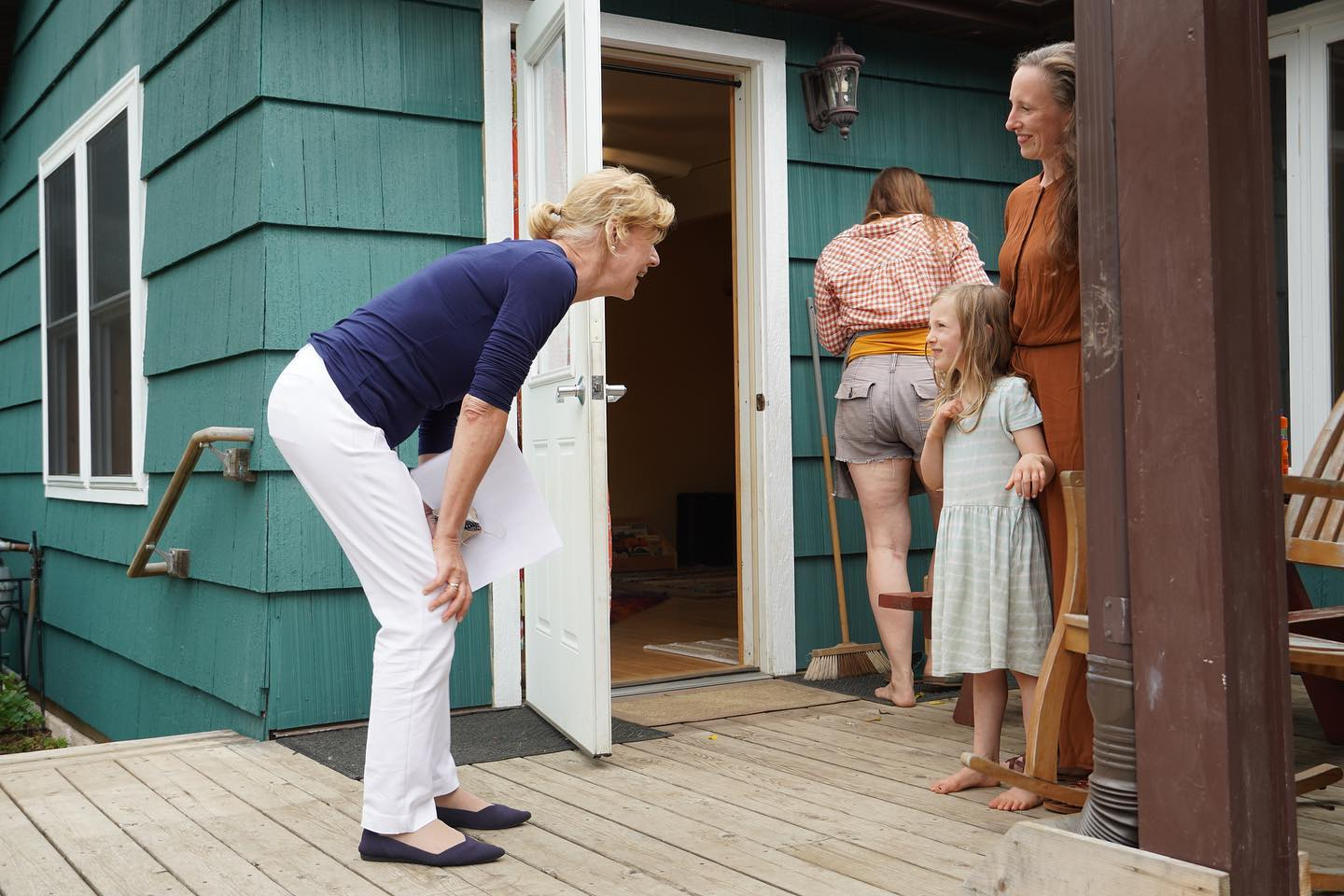
Baldwin meets with a family to discuss the expanded child tax credit of 2021

In 2003, Baldwin served on the advisory committee of the Progressive Majority, a political action committee dedicated to electing progressive candidates to public office.

In 2012, Baldwin described herself as a progressive in the mold of former Wisconsin governor and U.S. senator Robert M. La Follette. In 2013, she and Wisconsin's senior U.S. Senator, Ron Johnson, split on votes more frequently than any other Senate duo from the same state. She was one of 16 female Democratic senators to sign a letter in 2013 endorsing Hillary Clinton as the Democratic nominee in the 2016 presidential election.

In 2023, the Lugar Center ranked Baldwin in the top third of senators for bipartisanship.

=== Agriculture ===
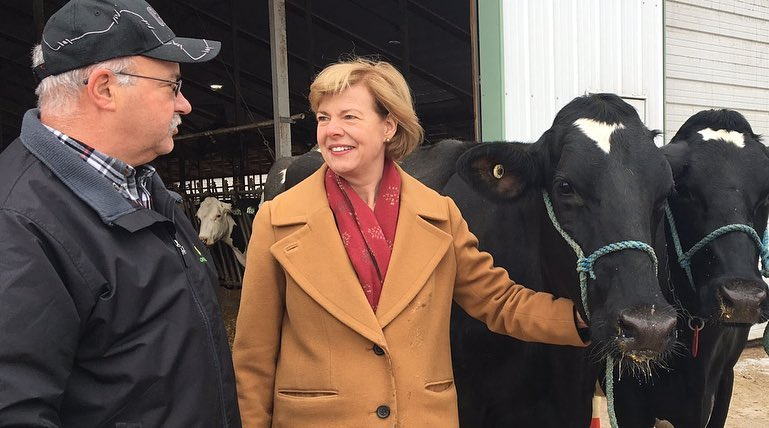
Baldwin meets with farmers about the Farm Bill of 2018

In 2019, she and eight other Democratic senators sent Secretary of Agriculture Sonny Perdue a letter that criticized the Department of Agriculture for purchasing pork from JBS USA, an American subsidiary of a Brazilian corporation.

=== Bush administration ===
Baldwin cosponsored H. Res. 333, a bill in 2007 proposing articles of impeachment against Vice President Dick Cheney, and H. Res. 589, a bill proposing the impeachment of Attorney General Alberto Gonzales. She wrote in the Milwaukee Journal Sentinel, "I joined with my colleagues on the House Judiciary Committee, Reps. Robert Wexler and Luis Gutiérrez, in urging Chairman John Conyers to conduct hearings on a resolution of impeachment now pending consideration in that committee." She added that although some constituents "say I have gone too far", others "argue I have not gone far enough" and feel "we are losing our democracy and that I should do more to hold the Bush administration accountable for its actions."

=== Climate change ===
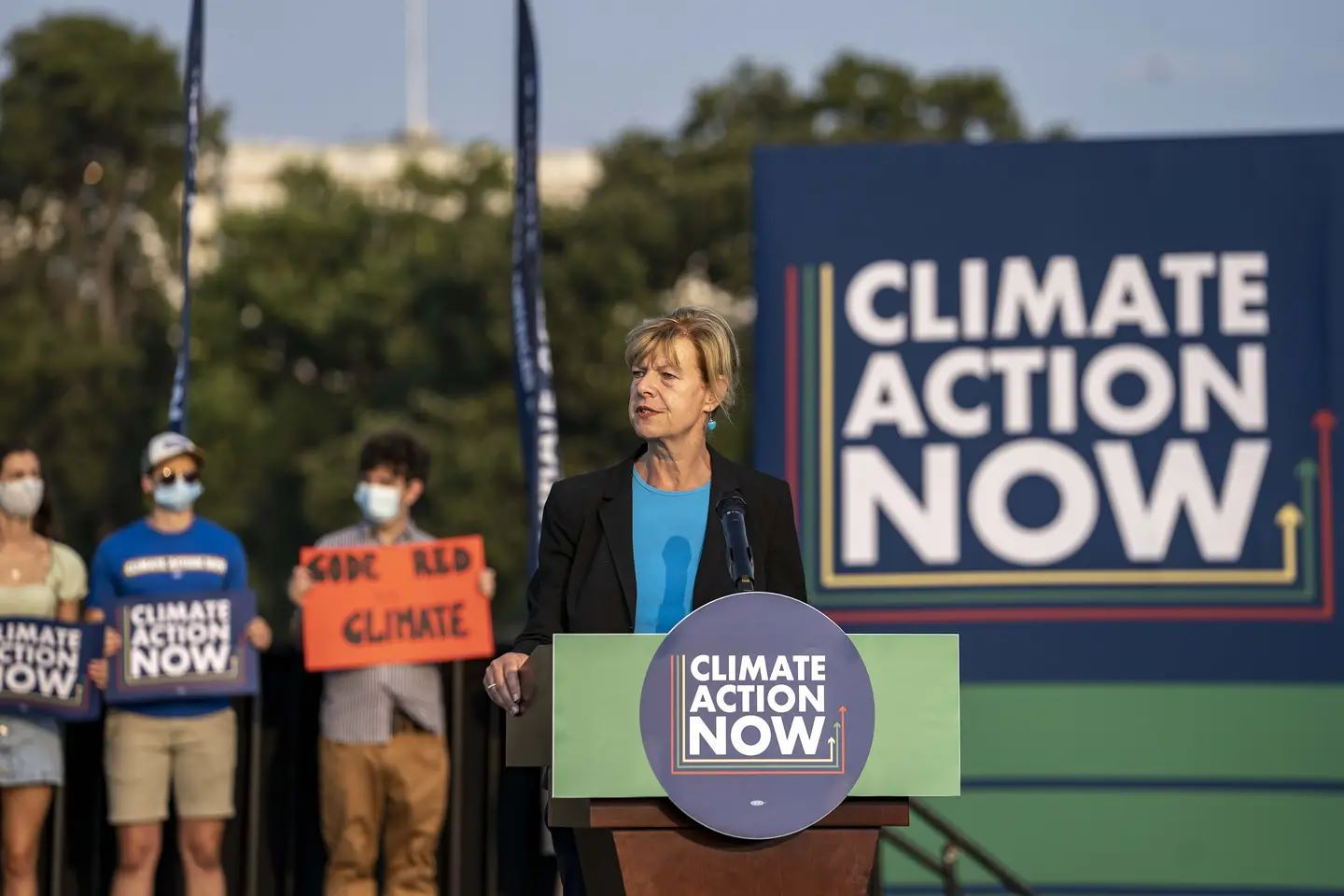
Baldwin pushes for climate action and the passage of the 2021 Build Back Better bill

In 2018, Baldwin was one of 25 Democratic senators to cosponsor a resolution in response to findings of the Intergovernmental Panel On Climate Change report and National Climate Assessment.

=== Crime ===
In 1995, Baldwin proposed the creation of a review board to investigate the deaths of prison inmates. In 1997, she authored a bill changing Wisconsin's candidate filing system to an electronic one. Baldwin opposes capital punishment.

=== Drug policy ===
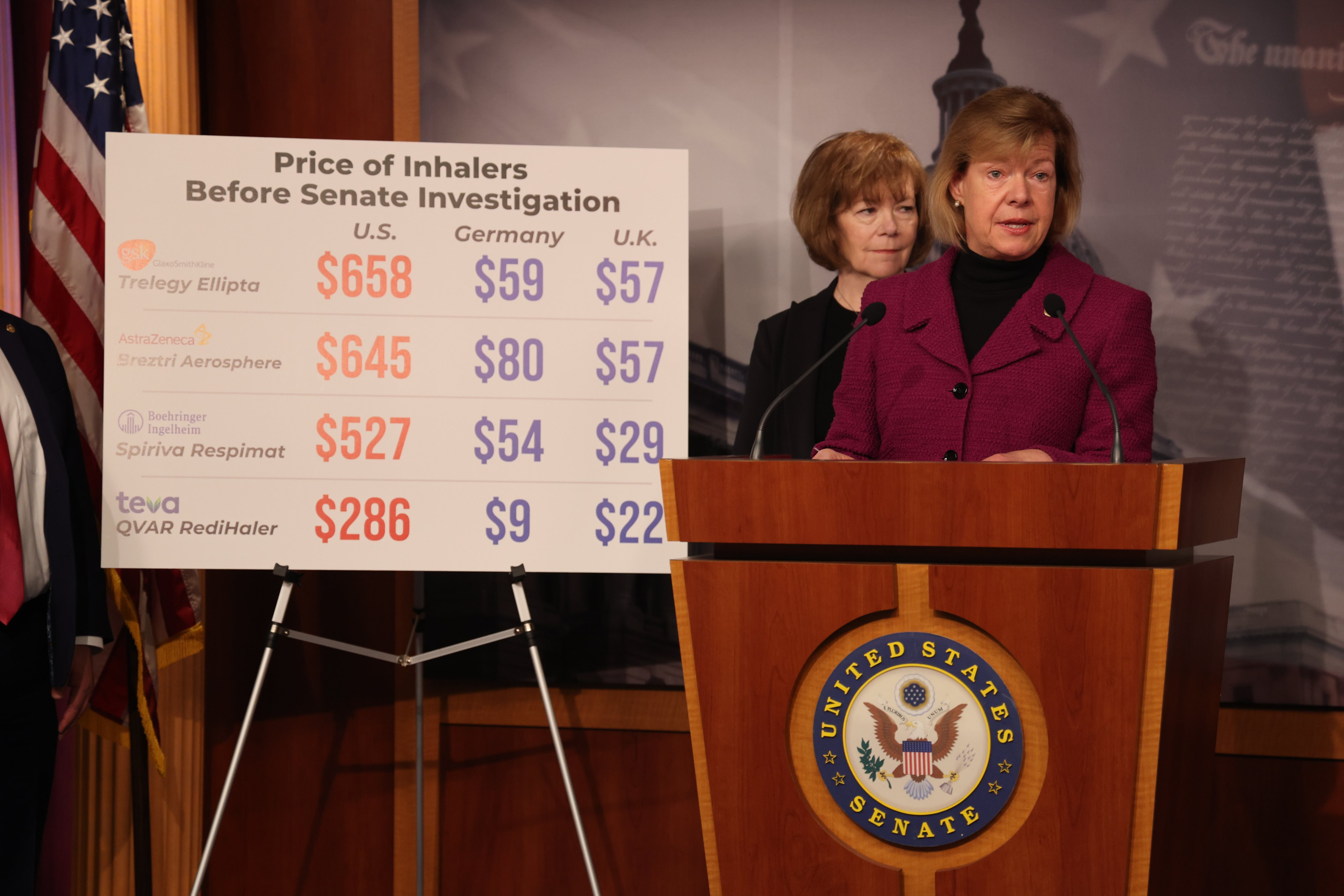
Baldwin speaks about asthma inhaler costs

Baldwin was one of 17 senators to have signed a letter to President-elect Donald Trump in 2016 asking him to fulfill a campaign pledge to bring down the cost of prescription drugs.

She was one of 31 senators to have signed a letter to Kaléo Pharmaceuticals in 2017 in response to the opioid-overdose-reversing device Evzio rising in price from $690 in 2014 to $4,500 and requested the company detail the price structure for Evzio, how many devices Kaléo Pharmaceuticals set aside for donation, and the totality of federal reimbursements Evzio received in the previous year.

Baldwin was one of six senators to have signed a letter to Senate Majority Leader Mitch McConnell and Senate Minority Leader Chuck Schumer in 2017 requesting their "help in ensuring the long-term sustainability of the 340B program", a Trump administration rule mandating that drug companies give discounts to health-care organizations presently serving large numbers of low-income patients.

=== Economic policy ===
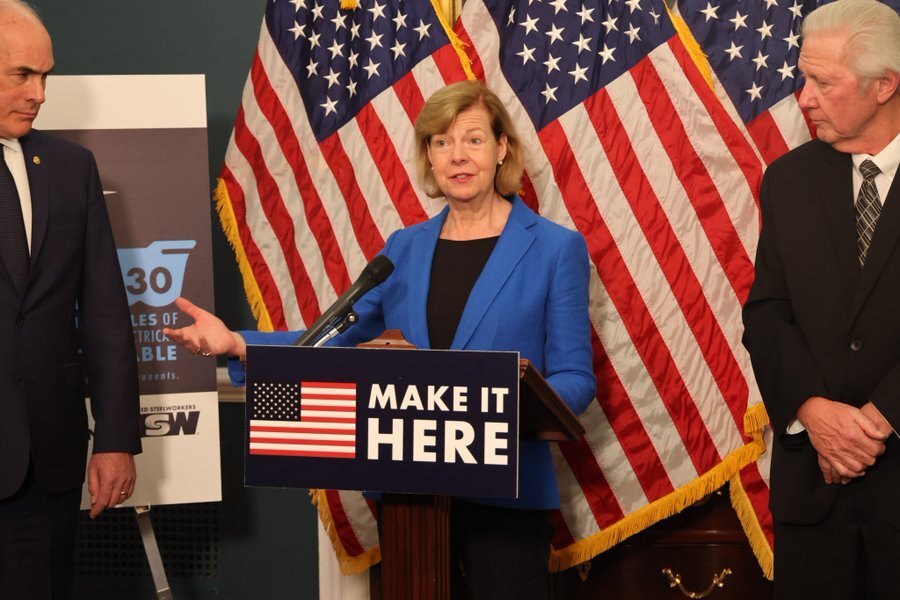
Baldwin pushes for domestic shipbuilding and Section 301 of the Trade Act of 1974 in 2024.

In a 2015 radio interview, Baldwin said that she, Pope Francis, and Donald Trump all supported repeal of the carried interest tax loophole. PolitiFact wrote that "while Pope Francis has called for helping the poor and addressing economic inequality, we could not find that [Trump] has spoken out on this particular tax break."

The editors of The Capital Times commended Baldwin for her vocal opposition to a budget resolution in 2017 that she believed would increase income inequality, calling her "one of the budget's most ardent foes". She expressed opposition to the Trump tax-reform bill, the Tax Cuts and Jobs Act of 2017, saying that it was being drafted "behind closed doors" and charging that it was being "shoved through." In its place she promoted the Stronger Way Act, a bill that she and Cory Booker co-sponsored.

Baldwin sponsored the Reward Work Act of 2018, which proposed to guarantee the right of employees in listed companies to elect one-third of the board of directors. She signed a letter to Secretary of Labor Alexander Acosta in 2019 that advocated that the U.S. Occupational Safety and Health Administration (OSHA) make a full investigation into a complaint filed in May by a group of Chicago-area McDonald's employees that detailed instances of workplace violence, such as customers throwing hot coffee and threatening employees with firearms. The senators argued that McDonald's could and should "do more to protect its employees, but employers will not take seriously their obligations to provide a safe workplace if OSHA does not enforce workers rights to a hazard-free workplace."

Baldwin supports Buy America rules and has advocated for their inclusion in federal funding bills.

==== Trade ====
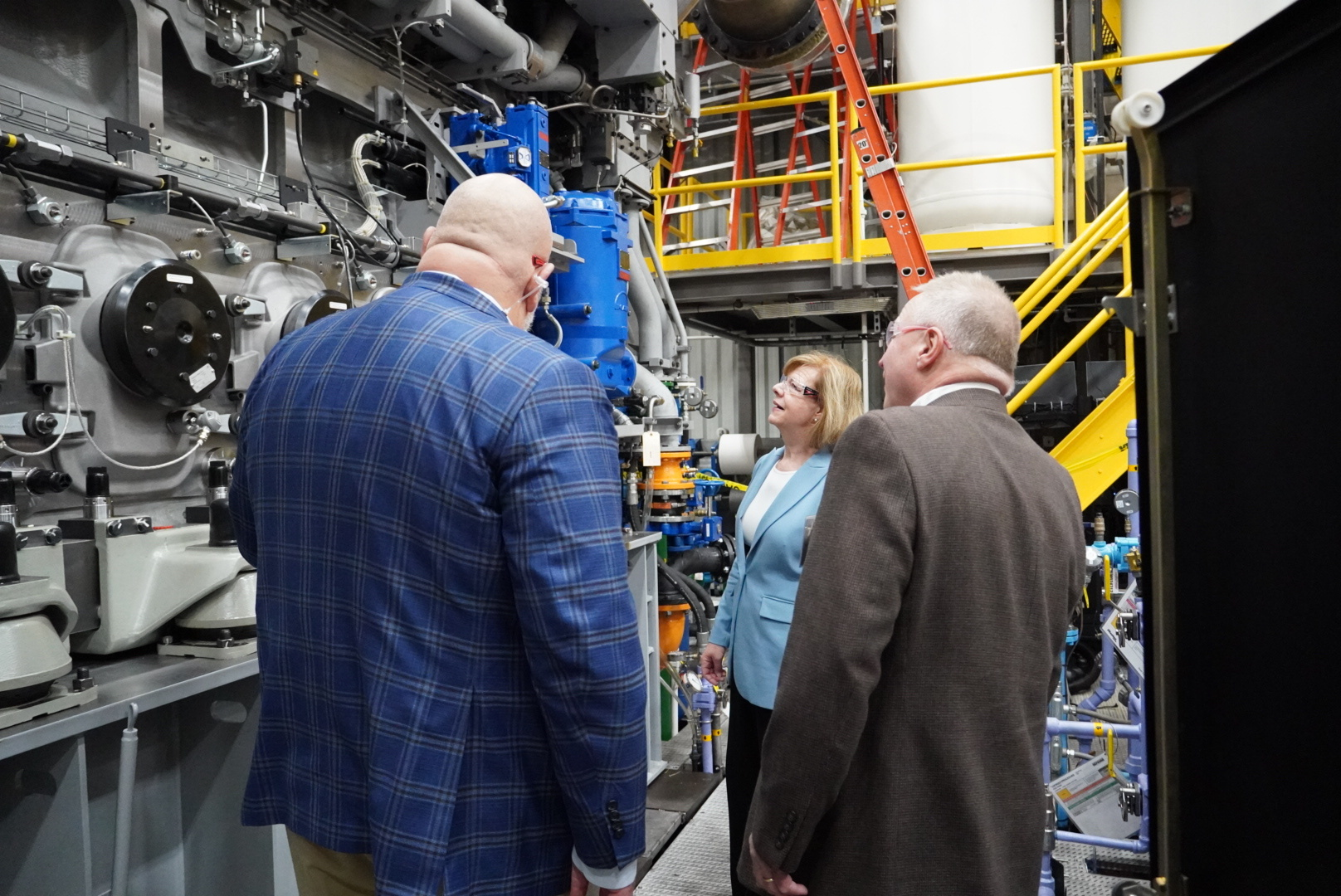
Baldwin visits Fairbanks Morse Defense in 2024

Baldwin was one of 12 senators to sign a letter to President Barack Obama in 2016 asserting that the passage of the Trans-Pacific Partnership "in its current form will perpetuate a trade policy that advantages corporations at the expense of American workers" and that there would be an "erosion of U.S. manufacturing and middle class jobs, and accelerate the corporate race to the bottom" if provisions were not fixed.

In 2024, Baldwin was one of a handful of Democrats credited with ending President Biden's proposed Indo-Pacific trade agenda. She said, "There were some big concerns that we would be retreating back to the day where trade was a race to the bottom, especially for workers."

==== Antitrust, competition, and corporate regulation ====
Baldwin was one of six Democrats led by Amy Klobuchar to sign letters in 2019 to the Federal Trade Commission (FTC) and the Department of Justice recounting that many of them had "called on both the FTC and the Justice Department to investigate potential anticompetitive activity in these markets, particularly following the significant enforcement actions taken by foreign competition enforcers against these same companies" and requesting that each agency confirm whether it had opened antitrust investigations into each company and that each agency pledge it would publicly release any such investigations' findings.

=== Foreign policy ===
==== Central America ====
Baldwin was one of 34 senators to sign a letter to President Trump in 2019 encouraging him "to listen to members of your own Administration and reverse a decision that will damage our national security and aggravate conditions inside Central America", asserting that Trump had "consistently expressed a flawed understanding of U.S. foreign assistance" since becoming president and that he was "personally undermining efforts to promote U.S. national security and economic prosperity" by preventing the use of Fiscal Year 2018 national security funding. The senators argued that foreign assistance to Central American countries created less migration to the U.S. by helping to improve conditions in those countries.

==== Israel ====
In 2020, Baldwin voiced her opposition to Israel's plan to annex parts of the Israeli-occupied West Bank. In March 2024, she urged the Biden administration to recognize a "nonmilitarized" Palestinian state after the end of the war in Gaza. In April, she voted for a $14 billion military aid package to Israel. Baldwin attended Prime Minister Benjamin Netanyahu's address to Congress in July 2024 and was the only Democratic representative from Wisconsin in attendance. After the address, she said she was "deeply disappointed" in the remarks, which came in the middle of the conflict in Gaza. Baldwin wrote that while she was "resolute" in her support for "Israel's right to defend itself and the need to end Hamas's threat... the time has come for the innocent bloodshed and the war to end". Baldwin supports a two-state solution to the Israeli-Palestine conflict. In July 2025, she voted in favor of two motions made by Senator Bernie Sanders to block arms sales to Israel.

==== Russia ====
Baldwin was one of 11 senators to sign a letter in 2017 to Attorney General Jeff Sessions expressing their concern "about credible allegations that the Trump campaign, transition team, and Administration has colluded with the Russian government, including most recently the events leading to the resignation of Lieutenant General Michael Flynn as National Security Adviser." The senators requested the creation of "an independent Special Counsel to investigate collusion with the Russian government by General Flynn and other Trump campaign, transition and Administrative officials" in order to maintain "the confidence, credibility and impartiality of the Department of Justice".

After Secretary of State Mike Pompeo announced in 2016 that the Trump administration was suspending its obligations in the Intermediate-Range Nuclear Forces Treaty in 60 days in the event that Russia continued to violate the treaty, Baldwin was one of 26 senators to sign a letter expressing concern over the administration "now abandoning generations of bipartisan U.S. leadership around the paired goals of reducing the global role and number of nuclear weapons and ensuring strategic stability with America's nuclear-armed adversaries" and calling on Trump to continue arms negotiations.

==== Opposition to Iraq War ====
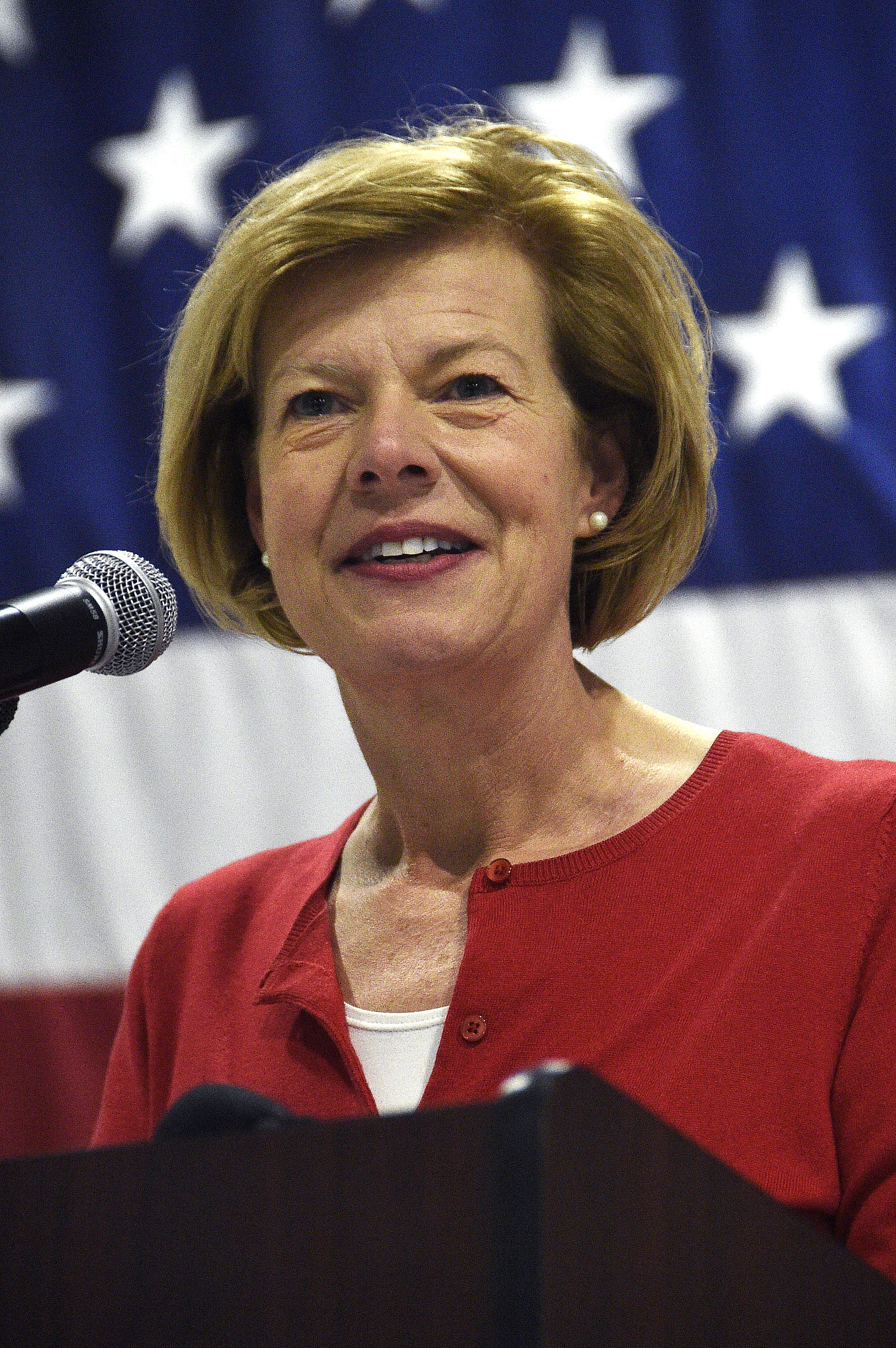
Baldwin welcomes back Wisconsin soldiers from Iraq, 2016

Baldwin was a vocal critic of the Iraq War. She was among 133 House members who voted in 2002 against authorizing the invasion of Iraq. She said there would be "postwar challenges", that "there is no history of democratic government in Iraq", that its "economy and infrastructure are in ruins after years of war and sanctions", and that rebuilding would take "a great deal of money". In 2005, she joined the Out of Iraq Caucus. In 2023, Baldwin voted with a bipartisan majority to repeal the Authorization for Use of Military Force (AUMF) in Iraq. She also supports repealing the 2001 AUMF for the War on Terror.

==== Saudi Arabia ====
Baldwin voted for a resolution by Rand Paul and Chris Murphy in 2017 that would block Trump's $510 million sale of precision-guided munitions to Saudi Arabia that made up a portion of the $110 billion arms sale Trump announced during his visit to Saudi Arabia the previous year.

Baldwin voted against tabling a resolution spearheaded by Bernie Sanders, Chris Murphy, and Mike Lee in 2018 that would have required Trump to withdraw American troops either in or influencing Yemen within the next 30 days unless they were combating Al-Qaeda. In 2021, she voted for a resolution, opposed by a 67–30 majority, that would have blocked a $650 billion weapons sale to Saudi Arabia.

=== Gun control ===
Baldwin was one of 18 senators to sign a letter to Thad Cochran and Barbara Mikulski in 2016 requesting that the Labor, Health and Education subcommittee hold a hearing on whether to allow the Centers for Disease Control and Prevention (CDC) to fund a study of gun violence.

Baldwin was a cosponsor of the Military Domestic Violence Reporting Enhancement Act in 2017, a bill to create a charge of domestic violence under the Uniform Code of Military Justice (UCMJ) and stipulate that convictions must be reported to federal databases to keep abusers from purchasing firearms within three days in an attempt to close a loophole in the UCMJ whereby convicted abusers retain the ability to purchase firearms.

Baldwin was a cosponsor of the NICS Denial Notification Act in 2018, legislation developed in the aftermath of the Stoneman Douglas High School shooting that would require federal authorities to inform states within a day after a person failing the National Instant Criminal Background Check System attempted to buy a firearm.

In 2022, Baldwin voted for the Bipartisan Safer Communities Act, a gun reform bill introduced after a deadly school shooting at Robb Elementary School in Uvalde, Texas. The bill enhanced background checks for firearm purchasers under age 21, provided funding for school-based mental health services, and partially closed the gun show loophole and boyfriend loophole.

=== Health care ===
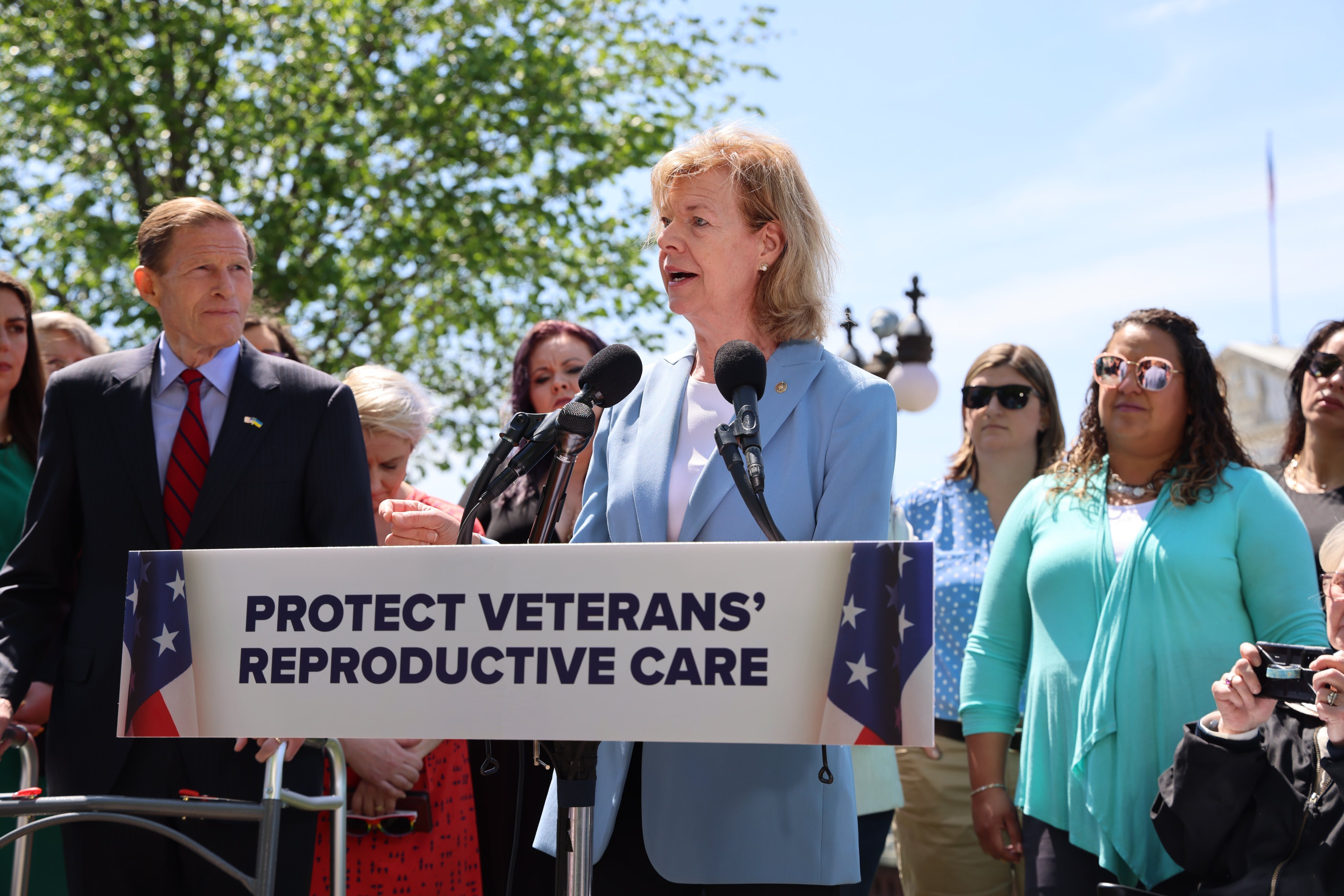
Baldwin pushes for continued access to reproductive care for veterans, 2023.

An outspoken advocate of single-payer, government-run universal health care since her days as a state legislator, Baldwin introduced the Health Security for All Americans Act, which would have required states to provide such a system, in 2000, 2002, 2004, and 2005. The bill died each time it was introduced without a House vote.

Baldwin has said that she "believes strongly that a single-payer health system is the best way to comprehensively and fairly reform our health care system." In 2009, she voted for the version of health-care reform that included a public option, a government-run health-care plan that would have competed with private insurers, but only the House passed that version. She ultimately voted for the Patient Protection and Affordable Care Act (Obamacare), which became law in 2010. Baldwin is credited with writing the ACA provision that allows Americans to stay on their parents' health insurance until age 26. She said she hoped a public option in the ACA would lead to a single-payer system. The first version of the ACA Baldwin voted for included a public option, but the final version did not.

In 2009, Baldwin introduced the Ending LGBT Health Disparities Act (ELHDA), which sought to advance LGBTQ health priorities by promoting research, cultural competency, and non-discrimination policies. The bill did not pass.

Baldwin was one of five Democratic senators to sign a letter to President Trump in 2017 warning that failure "to take immediate action to oppose the lawsuit or direct House Republicans to forgo this effort will increase instability in the insurance market, as insurers may choose not to participate in the marketplace in 2018" and that they remained concerned that his administration "has still not provided certainty to insurers and consumers that you will protect the cost-sharing subsidies provided under the law."

Also in 2017, Baldwin wrote an op-ed titled "Why I support Medicare for all and other efforts to expand health coverage." In 2018 she was one of ten senators to sponsor the Choose Medicare Act, an expanded public option for health insurance that also increased Obamacare subsidies and rendered people with higher incomes eligible for its assistance.

During the 2018–19 United States federal government shutdown, Baldwin was one of 34 senators to sign a letter to Commissioner of Food and Drugs Scott Gottlieb recognizing the FDA's efforts to address the shutdown's effect on public health and employees while remaining alarmed "that the continued shutdown will result in increasingly harmful effects on the agency's employees and the safety and security of the nation's food and medical products."

In 2019, Baldwin was one of 11 senators to sign a letter to insulin manufactures Eli Lilly and Company, Novo, and Sanofi about their increased insulin prices depriving patients of "access to the life-saving medications they need". She was one of eight senators to cosponsor the Palliative Care and Hospice Education and Training Act (PCHETA), a bill intended to strengthen training for new and existing physicians, people who teach palliative care, and other providers on the palliative care team that grants patients and their families a voice in their care and treatment goals. In 2022, Baldwin voted with Democrats to pass the Inflation Reduction Act, which capped the cost of insulin for seniors on Medicare at $35 a month. The act also allowed Medicare to negotiate lower drug prices.

=== Housing ===
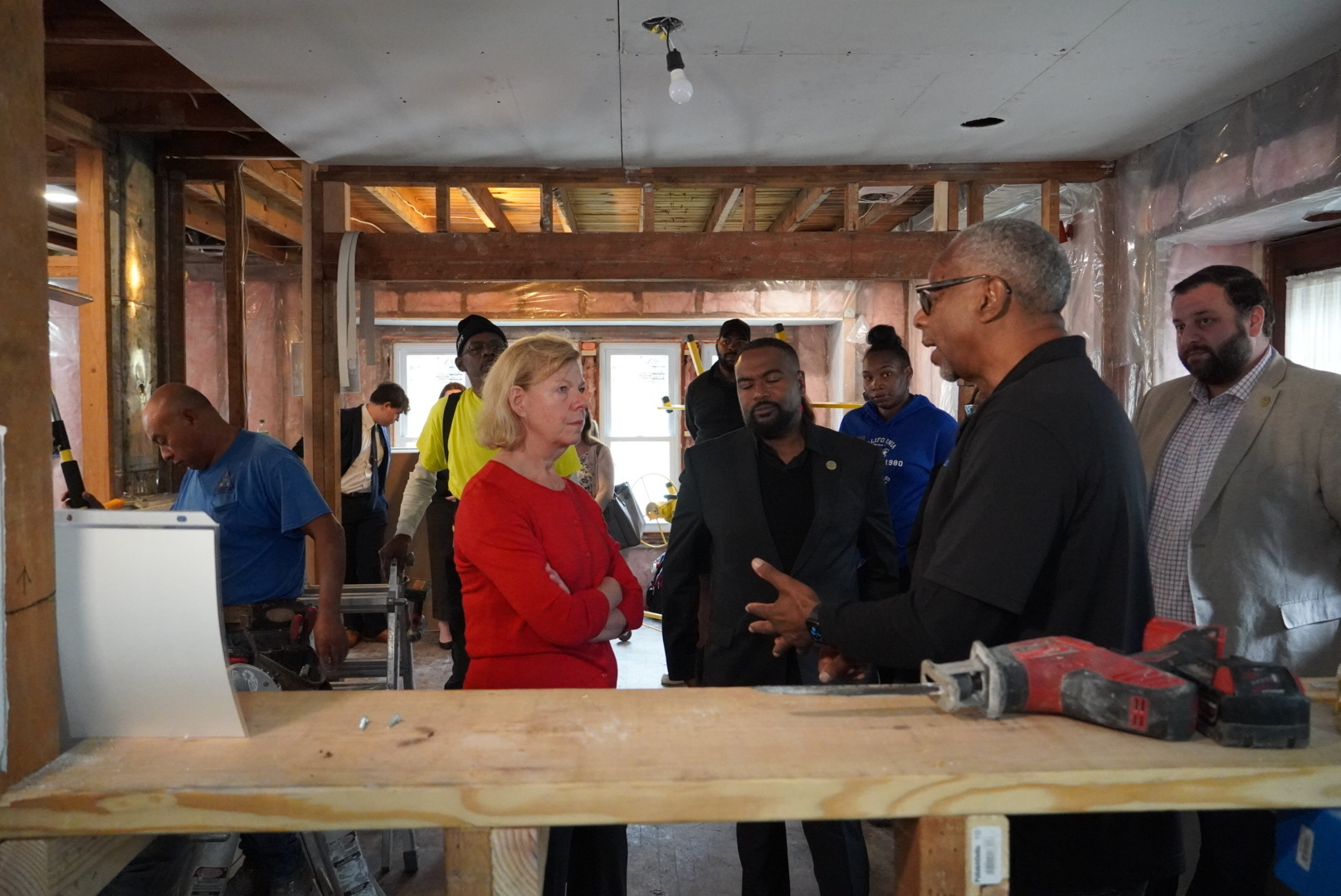
Baldwin visits community organization that rehabilitates houses with federal grants she secured for the state, 2023.

Baldwin was one of 41 senators to sign a bipartisan letter in 2019 to the housing subcommittee supporting the Housing and Urban Development Department's Section 4 Capacity Building program as authorizing "HUD to partner with national nonprofit community development organizations to provide education, training, and financial support to local community development corporations (CDCs) across the country" and expressing disappointment that President Trump's budget "has slated this program for elimination after decades of successful economic and community development." The senators wrote of their hope that the subcommittee would support continued funding for Section 4 in Fiscal Year 2020.

In 2024, Baldwin co-sponsored the Stop Predatory Investing Act to ban corporate investors that buy up more than 50 single-family homes from deducting interest or depreciation on those properties.

=== Immigration ===
Baldwin voted against building a fence on the U.S.–Mexico border in 2006. She voted in 2013 for S. 744, the Border Security, Economic Opportunity, and Immigration Modernization Act. She voted against Kate's Law in 2016.

=== LGBT rights ===
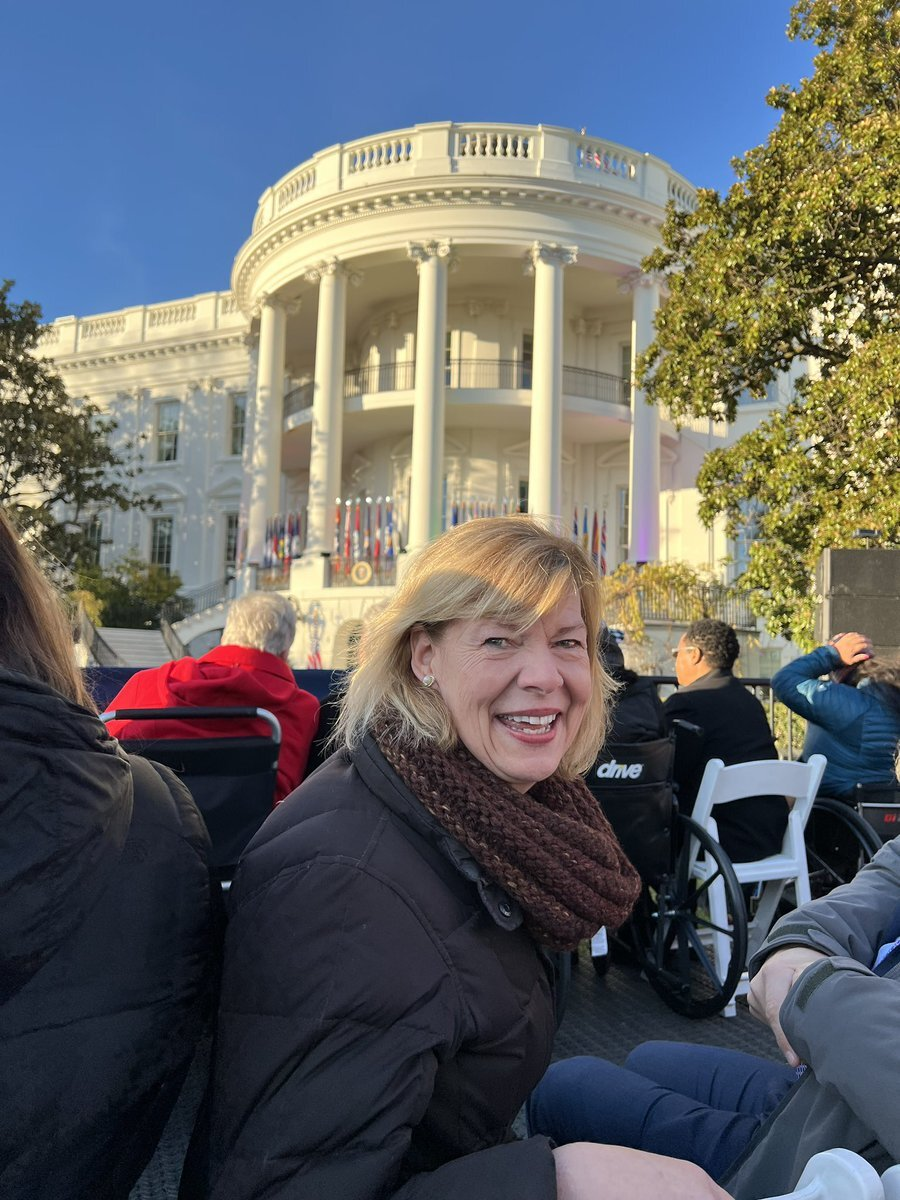
Baldwin at the White House to celebrate the signing of the Respect for Marriage Act, 2022.

In 1993, Baldwin became the first openly lesbian woman elected to the Wisconsin State Assembly and one of few openly LGBT people elected to political offices in the United States at the time of her election.

In 1993, she said she was disappointed by President Bill Clinton's support of the military's "don't ask, don't tell" policy, calling it "a concession to bigotry". In 1994, she proposed legalizing same-sex marriage in Wisconsin. In 1995, she proposed domestic partnerships in Wisconsin.

In 2018, Baldwin was one of 20 senators to sign a letter to Secretary of State Mike Pompeo urging him to reverse the rollback of a policy that granted visas to same-sex partners of LGBTQ diplomats who had unions that were not recognized by their home countries, writing that too many places around the world had seen LGBTQ people "subjected to discrimination and unspeakable violence, and receive little or no protection from the law or local authorities" and that refusing to let LGBTQ diplomats bring their partners to the U.S. would be equivalent to upholding "the discriminatory policies of many countries around the world".

In 2019, Baldwin was one of 18 senators to sign a letter to Pompeo requesting an explanation of a State Department decision not to issue an official statement that year commemorating Pride Month or to issue the annual cable outlining activities for embassies commemorating Pride Month. They also asked why the LGBTI special envoy position remained vacant and wrote that "preventing the official flying of rainbow flags and limiting public messages celebrating Pride Month signals to the international community that the United States is abandoning the advancement of LGBTI rights as a foreign policy priority".

In 2022, Baldwin helped pass the Respect for Marriage Act.

On December 16, 2024, Baldwin led over 20 Democratic senators in introducing an amendment to the Senate version of the NDAA 2025 that removed the restriction on TRICARE coverage for gender-affirming care for minors. The amendment was not brought up for a vote.

=== Terrorism ===
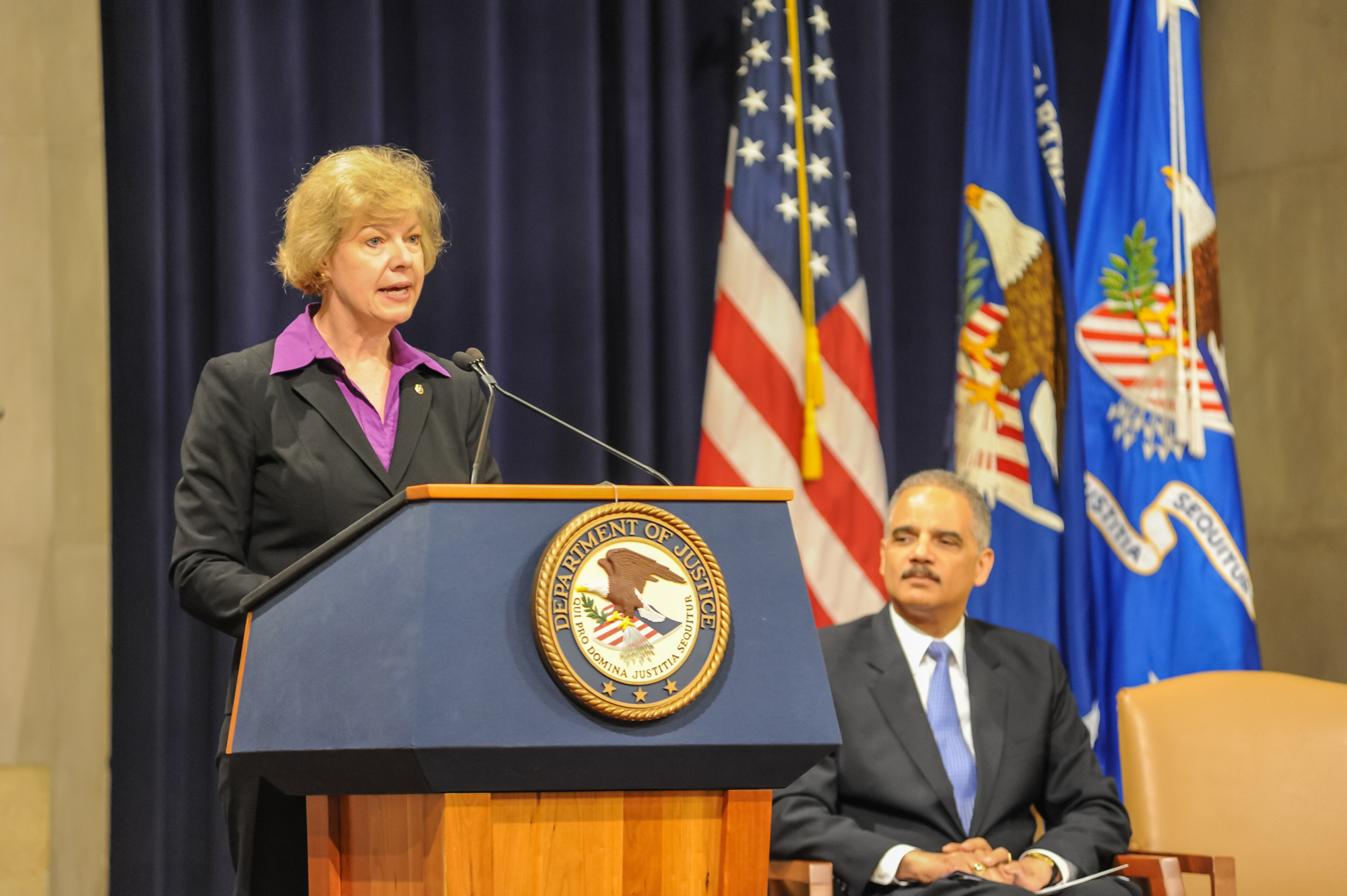
Baldwin speaking at a U.S. Department of Justice event

In 2013, Baldwin introduced a bill that would "bring greater government transparency, oversight and due process whenever authorities use information gathered for intelligence purposes to make domestic non-terrorism cases against Americans."

She called the mass shooting in Orlando, Florida in 2016 a "hate crime", and said, "The question now for America is are we going to come together and stand united against hate, gun violence and terrorism?"

Baldwin was one of 22 members of Congress to vote against a 2006 9/11 memorial bill; she said she "voted against the bill because Republicans had inserted provisions praising the Patriot Act and hard-line immigration measures". She voted nine times in favor of other similar bills.

Her vote received renewed attention in Wisconsin's 2012 U.S. Senate race, when Tommy Thompson's campaign released an ad about it that PolitiFact rated "Mostly False". Thompson said, "Wisconsin voters need to know that Congresswoman Tammy Baldwin put her extreme views above honoring the men and women who were murdered by the terrorists in the Sept. 11 attacks on our nation." PolitiFact wrote, "Thompson said his Democratic challenger voted against a resolution honoring 9/11 victims. Technically, he's correct. Baldwin voted against the measure in 2006—and criticized Republicans for adding in references to the Patriot Act, immigration bills, and other controversial matters. But Baldwin has voted nine times in favor of similar resolutions, and the day before the vote in question supported creation of a memorial at the World Trade Center site. Thompson's statement contains an element of truth, but leaves out critical information that would give a different impression. That's our definition of Mostly False."

=== U.S. Postal Service ===
Baldwin was a cosponsor of a bipartisan resolution led by Gary Peters and Jerry Moran in 2019 that opposed privatization of the U.S. Postal Service (USPS), citing the USPS as a self-sustained establishment and noting concerns that privatization could cause higher prices and reduced services for its customers, especially in rural communities.

=== Veterans ===
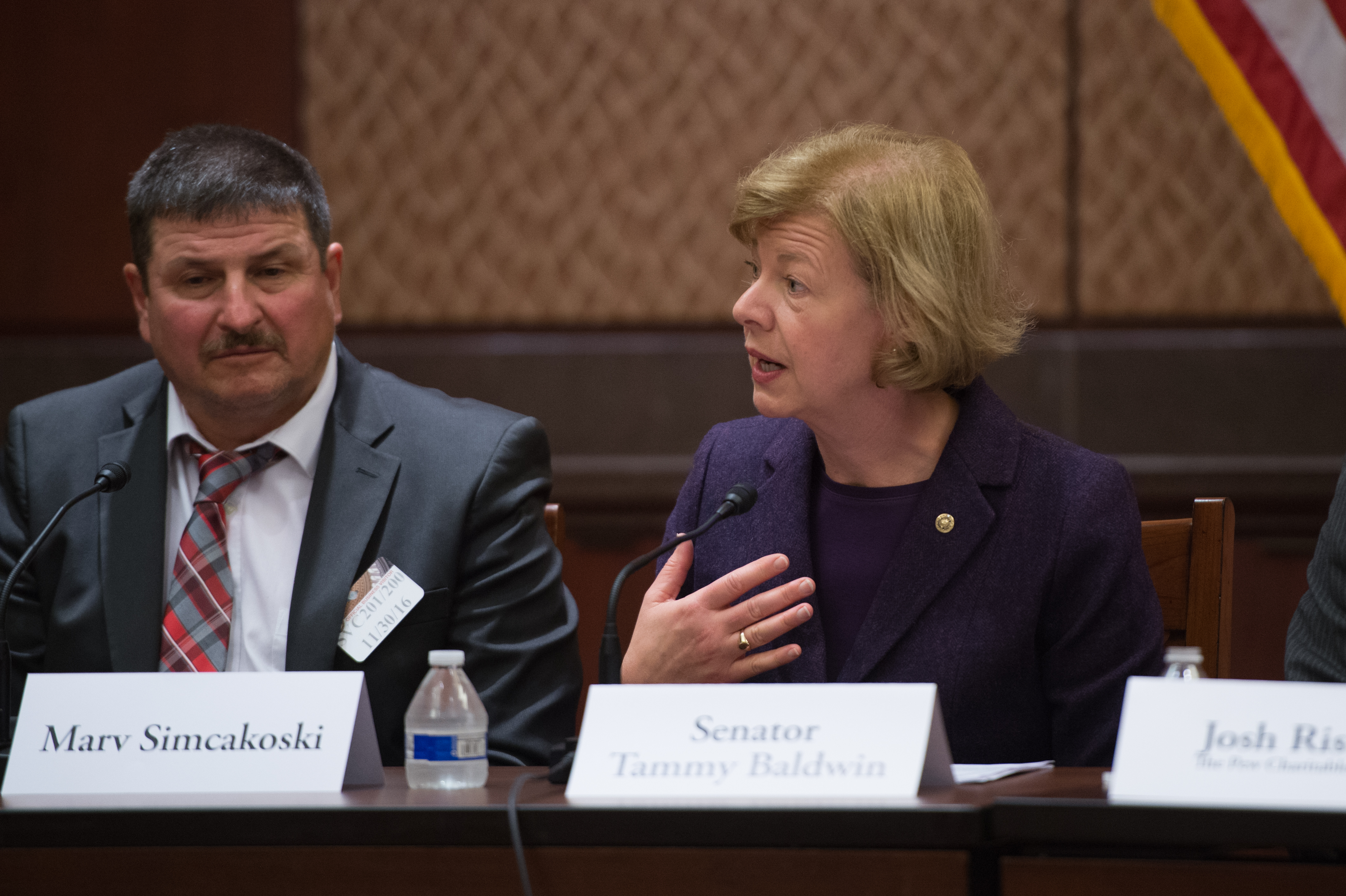
Baldwin discusses the Jason Simcakoski Memorial and Promise Act, 2016

In August 2013, Baldwin was one of 23 Democratic senators to sign a letter to the Department of Defense warning that some payday lenders were "offering predatory loan products to service members at exorbitant triple digit effective interest rates and loan products that do not include the additional protections envisioned by the law" and asserting that service members and their families "deserve the strongest possible protections and swift action to ensure that all forms of credit offered to members of our armed forces are safe and sound."

In January 2015, USA Today obtained a copy of a report by the Department of Veterans Affairs inspector general about the Tomah, Wisconsin Veterans Affairs medical facility. The report said that two physicians at the Tomah VA were among the biggest prescribers of opioids in a multi-state region, raising "potentially serious concerns". Baldwin's office had received the report in August 2014 but did not take action until January 2015, when Baldwin called for an investigation after the Center for Investigative Reporting published details of the report, including information about a veteran who died from an overdose at the facility. A whistleblower and former Tomah VA employee learned that Baldwin's office had a copy of the report, and repeatedly emailed Baldwin's office asking that she take action on the issue. Baldwin's office did not explain why they waited from August 2014 to January 2015 to call for an investigation. Baldwin was the only member of Congress who had a copy of the report.

In February 2015, Baldwin fired her deputy state director over her handling of the VA report. The aide was offered but declined a severance deal that included a cash payout and a confidentiality agreement that would have required her to keep quiet. The aide filed an ethics complaint with the United States Senate Select Committee on Intelligence. The complaint was dismissed as lacking merit. Baldwin said, "we should have done a better job listening to and communicating with another constituent with whom we were working on problems at the VA", and that she had started a review of why her office had failed to act on the report. As a result of the review, Baldwin fined her chief of staff, demoted her state director, and reassigned a veterans' outreach staffer. In 2016, Baldwin introduced a bill named after the affected veteran, Jason Simcakoski, to strengthen opioid prescribing practices and guidelines at the VA. In November 2017, Baldwin co-sponsored legislation designed to strengthen opioid safety in the Department of Veterans Affairs.

In 2021, Baldwin co-sponsored a bill to expand VA health benefits for veterans who were exposed to burn pits at Karshi-Khanabad Air Base in Uzbekistan, also known as K2 Air Base.

== Personal life ==
Baldwin was in a relationship with Lauren Azar for 15 years; the couple registered as domestic partners in 2009. They separated in 2010.

Baldwin was baptized Episcopalian but considers herself "unaffiliated" with a religion.

In 2020, in honor of the 50th anniversary of the first LGBTQ Pride parade, Queerty named Baldwin one of 50 heroes "leading the nation toward equality, acceptance, and dignity for all people".

== Electoral history ==
=== U.S. House (1998–2010) ===
Year	Election	Date	Elected				Defeated				Total	Plurality
1998	Primary	Sep. 8	Tammy Baldwin	Democratic	24,227	37.09%	Richard J. Phelps	Dem.	22,610	34.62%	65,317	1,617
1998	Primary	Sep. 8	Tammy Baldwin	Democratic	24,227	37.09%	Joe Wineke	Dem.	17,444	26.71%	65,317	1,617
1998	Primary	Sep. 8	Tammy Baldwin	Democratic	24,227	37.09%	Patrick J. O'Brien	Dem.	1,036	1.59%	65,317	1,617
1998	General	Nov. 3	Tammy Baldwin	Democratic	116,377	52.87%	Josephine Musser	Rep.	103,528	47.03%	220,115	12,849
1998	General	Nov. 3	Tammy Baldwin	Democratic	116,377	52.87%	Marc Gumz (write-in)	Rep.	107	0.05%	220,115	12,849
1998	General	Nov. 3	Tammy Baldwin	Democratic	116,377	52.87%	John Stumpf (write-in)	Tax.	103	0.05%	220,115	12,849
2000	General	Nov. 7	Tammy Baldwin (inc)	Democratic	163,534	51.36%	John Sharpless	Rep.	154,632	48.57%	318,380	8,902
2002	General	Nov. 5	Tammy Baldwin (inc)	Democratic	163,313	66.01%	Ron Greer	Rep.	83,694	33.83%	247,410	79,619
2004	General	Nov. 2	Tammy Baldwin (inc)	Democratic	251,637	63.27%	Dave Magnum	Rep.	145,810	36.66%	397,724	105,827
2006	General	Nov. 7	Tammy Baldwin (inc)	Democratic	191,414	62.82%	Dave Magnum	Rep.	113,015	37.09%	304,688	78,399
2008	General	Nov. 4	Tammy Baldwin (inc)	Democratic	277,914	69.33%	Peter Theron	Rep.	122,513	30.56%	400,841	155,401
2010	General	Nov. 2	Tammy Baldwin (inc)	Democratic	191,164	61.77%	Chad Lee	Rep.	118,099	38.16%	309,460	73,065

=== U.S. Senate (2012–present) ===
2012 United States Senate election, Wisconsin
Party	Candidate	Votes	%	±%
Democratic	Tammy Baldwin	1,547,104	51.41%	−15.90
Republican	Tommy Thompson	1,380,126	45.86%	+16.38
Libertarian	Joseph Kexel	62,240	2.07%	N/A
Independent	Nimrod Allen, III	16,455	0.55%	N/A
Write-in		3,486	0.11%	+0.05
Majority		166,978	5.55%	
Turnout		3,009,411		
Democratic hold		Swing		

2018 United States Senate election, Wisconsin
Party	Candidate	Votes	%	±%
Democratic	Tammy Baldwin	1,472,914	55.36%	+3.95
Republican	Leah Vukmir	1,184,885	44.53%	−1.33
Write-in		2,964	0.11%	N/A
Majority		288,029	10.83%	+5.25
Turnout		2,660,763		
Democratic hold		Swing		

2024 United States Senate election, Wisconsin
Party	Candidate	Votes	%	±%
Democratic	Tammy Baldwin	1,672,777	49.33%	−6.03
Republican	Eric Hovde	1,643,996	48.48%	+3.95
Disrupt the Corruption	Phil Anderson	42,315	1.25%	N/A
America First	Thomas Leager	28,751	0.85%	N/A
Write-in		2,948	0.09%	−0.02
Majority		28,781	0.85%	−9.98
Turnout		3,390,787		
Democratic hold		Swing		

== See also ==
- List of LGBTQ members of the United States Congress
- Women in the United States House of Representatives
- Women in the United States Senate

U.S. House of Representatives
Preceded by Scott Klug	Member of the U.S. House of Representatives from Wisconsin's 2nd congressional district 1999–2013	Succeeded by Mark Pocan
New office	Chair of the Congressional Equality Caucus; 2008–2013; Served alongside: Barney Frank	Succeeded by Jared Polis
Party political offices
Preceded by Herb Kohl	Democratic nominee for U.S. Senator from Wisconsin (Class 1); 2012, 2018, 2024	Most recent
Preceded by Patty Murray	Secretary of the Senate Democratic Caucus; 2017–present	Incumbent
U.S. Senate
Preceded by Herb Kohl	United States Senator (Class 1) from Wisconsin; 2013–present Served alongside: Ron Johnson	Incumbent
U.S. order of precedence (ceremonial)
Preceded by Ted Cruz	Order of precedence of the United States as United States Senator	Succeeded by Deb Fischer
Preceded by Tim Scott	United States senators by seniority 35th	Succeeded by Chris Murphy
