= List of fellows of the Royal Society elected in 1942 =

This is a list of people elected Fellow of the Royal Society in 1942.

== Fellows ==
- Joshua Harold Burn
- Sir Frank Macfarlane Burnet
- Malcolm Dixon
- Sir Edward Charles Dodds
- Arthur Fage
- Neil Hamilton Fairley
- Philip Hall
- Charles Samuel Hanes
- George Hugh Henderson
- Thomas Percy Hilditch
- Edward Hindle
- Arthur Holmes
- Dudley Maurice Newitt
- Sir Clifford Copland Paterson
- John Keith Roberts
- Herbert Wakefield Banks Skinner
- David Thoday
- Alexander Robertus Todd, Baron Todd of Trumpington
- Sir Arthur Elijah Trueman
- Sir Alan Herries Wilson

== Foreign members ==
- Alfred Newton Richards
- Leopold Ruzicka
- Nicholas Ivanovich Vavilov
- Ivan Matveevich Vinogradov

== Statute 12 ==
- Maurice Pascal Alers Hankey, 1st Baron Hankey of the Chart
