= Minor J. Coon =

American biochemist

- Born: Minor Jesser Coon; July 29, 1921; Englewood, Colorado, U.S.
- Died: September 5, 2018 (aged 97); Ann Arbor, Michigan, U.S.
- Other names: Jud
- Education: University of Colorado Boulder; University of Illinois at Urbana–Champaign
- Known for: Study of cytochrome P-450
- Scientific career
- Fields: Biochemistry
- Institutions: University of Michigan, Ann Arbor
- Doctoral advisor: William C. Rose

Minor Jesser Coon (July 29, 1921 – September 5, 2018) was an American biochemist and Victor V Vaughan Distinguished University Professor Emeritus at the University of Michigan, Ann Arbor. He is best known for his research on cytochrome P-450 and as the co-discoverer of HMG-CoA, along with Bimal Kumar Bachhawat. He died on September 5, 2018, from complications due to Alzheimer's disease.

== Early life and education ==
Coon was born in Englewood, Colorado, in 1921. He was an undergraduate student at the University of Colorado Boulder and received his bachelor's degree with honors in 1943. He received his Ph.D. from the University of Illinois at Urbana–Champaign in 1946, supervised by William Cumming Rose. During his graduate work he studied amino acid metabolism and nitrogen balance using himself and his fellow students as volunteer subjects.

== Academic career ==
After a year as a postdoctoral fellow at the University of Illinois, Coon became a faculty member at the University of Pennsylvania in 1947. He moved to the University of Michigan Medical School in 1955 and remained there for the remainder of his career, chairing the biological chemistry department from 1970 to 1990 and becoming the Victor V. Vaughan Distinguished University Professor of Biological Chemistry in 1983. Coon served as the president of the American Society for Biochemistry and Molecular Biology from 1991 to 1992. He became a member of the United States National Academy of Sciences in 1983 and a fellow of the American Academy of Arts and Sciences in 1984. A biological chemistry professorship in his honor was established at the University of Michigan in 1991.

Coon mentored many graduate students and promoted teaching along with research, including David Ballou and Professor Emeritus Tetsufumi Ueda, a pioneer in neuroscience. The Minor J. and Mary Lou Coon Award was established by him and his wife, to recognize an outstanding graduate student in biological chemistry at the University of Michigan who excels at teaching, research, and service.

== Interests ==
Coon was a patron of the arts.

== Awards and honors ==
Coon has received a number of awards in recognition of his scientific achievements.

- Paul-Lewis Award in Enzyme Chemistry, 1959
- William C. Rose Award in Biochemistry, 1978
- Bernard B. Brodie Award in Drug Metabolism, 1980
- Member, United States National Academy of Sciences, 1983
- Fellow, American Academy of Arts and Sciences, 1984
- Member, Institute of Medicine, 1987
- Honorary Doctor of Medicine, Karolinska Institute
