= Jenny Glusker =

British biochemist (born 1931)

Jenny P. Glusker
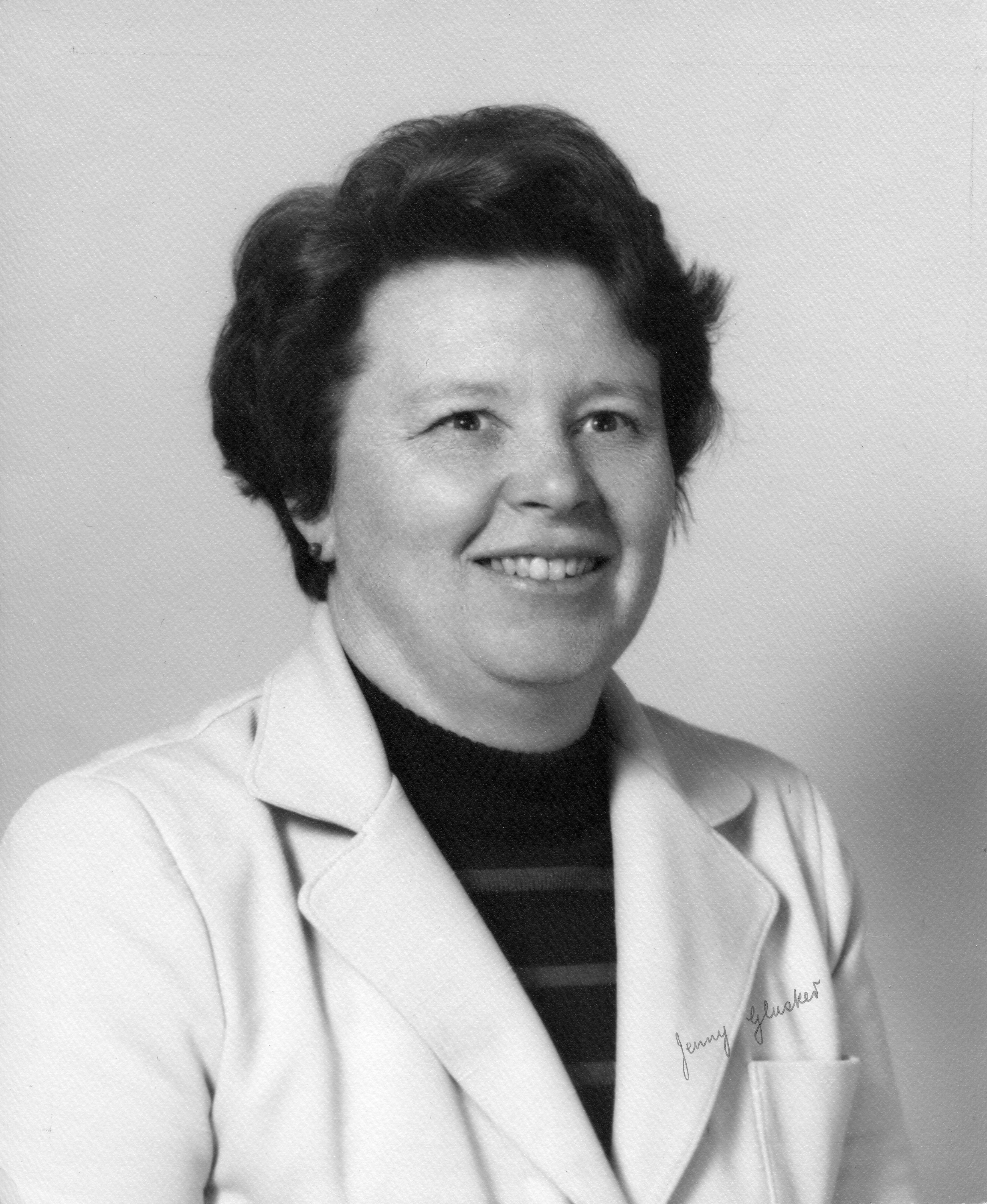
- Glusker in 1979
- Born: 28 June 1931 (age 94); Birmingham, England
- Awards: Garvan–Olin Medal (1979); John Scott Medal (2011)
- Scientific career
- Fields: Crystallography, biochemistry
- Institutions: Fox Chase Cancer Center; University of Pennsylvania
- Notable students: Miriam Rossi; Helen M. Berman

Jenny Pickworth Glusker (born 28 June 1931) is a British biochemist and crystallographer. Since 1956 she has worked at the Fox Chase Cancer Center, a National Cancer Research Institute in the United States. She was also an adjunct professor of biochemistry and biophysics at the University of Pennsylvania.

== Biography ==
Jenny Pickworth was born on 28 June 1931 in Birmingham, England, the eldest of three siblings. Her parents were both physicians. Her father Frederick Alfred Pickworth was a chemist who studied medicine and did neurology research in Birmingham. Her mother, Jane Wylie Stocks, was from Scotland, studied medicine in Glasgow, and worked in Dublin in the 1920s. Stocks later got a job in Birmingham, where she married Frederick Alfred Pickworth.

During her school years, Pickworth developed an early enthusiasm for chemistry, due largely to her chemistry teacher and her mother's textbooks. Her parents wanted her to study medicine. She agreed with her father that she would attend the Medical School of the University of Birmingham if she was rejected from Somerville College of the University of Oxford. She successfully completed her entrance exam in Oxford, receiving her bachelor's degree in chemistry in 1953 and later earning her doctorate under Dorothy Hodgkin. By the end of 1955, she was involved in the X-ray structural analysis of corrin ring from vitamin B12, for which Hodgkin was awarded the 1964 Nobel Prize in Chemistry; Glusker earned her doctorate in 1957.

During her undergraduate studies, she met the American chemist Donald L. Glusker, who had secured a Rhodes Scholarship to Oxford. They married in 1955 in the United States and went together as post-doctoral researchers to Caltech, where Jenny Glusker worked in the laboratory of Linus Pauling. In 1956 she moved with her husband to Philadelphia where she became a research fellow and research associate with Arthur Lindo Patterson at the Institute for Cancer Research (ICR; now Fox Chase Cancer Center). She initially worked only part-time in order to raise her three children. After Patterson died in November 1966, Glusker eventually took over his lab and became a junior faculty member at the Institute for Cancer Research. She became a Member of the Institute for Cancer Research of the Fox Chase Cancer Center in 1977 (equivalent of associate professor) and a Senior Member (equivalent of full professor) in 1979, until her retirement in 2003. She remains a professor emerita of the Fox Chase Cancer Center.

At the ICR, Glusker initially examined the structure of small molecules of the citric acid cycle, in particular aconitase-catalyzed citrate, and its conformation as a ligand to iron atoms of the iron-sulfur cluster of aconitase, which led to a better understanding of the three-dimensional structure and mechanism of the enzymes (ferrous-wheel mechanism). Later her laboratory performed crystallographic analyses of anti-tumor agents and, amongst others, the structure and conformation of estramustine and acridine. They further tested carcinogens such as polycyclic aromatic hydrocarbons as well as the structure of the enzyme xylose isomerase. In 1972 Glusker and structural biologist Helen M. Berman reported on the crystal structure of a nucleic acid-drug complex as a model for anti-tumor agent and mutagen action.

== Awards ==
- 1979: Garvan–Olin Medal (American Chemical Society)
- 1995: Fankuchen Award (American Crystallographic Association)
- 2011: John Scott Medal (Philadelphia City Council)
- 2014: William Procter Prize for Scientific Achievement

Glusker is an Honorary Fellow of Somerville College.

== Selected publications ==
- By Kenneth N. Trueblood: Crystal Structure Analysis:. A primer (1st edition 1972, 2nd edition 1985) 3rd Edition, Oxford University Press, Oxford / New York 2010, ISBN 978-0199576340.
- With Dan McLachlan (ed.): Crystallography in North America American Crystallographic Association, New York 1983. ISBN 978-0937140079.
- With Mitchell Lewis, Miriam Rossi: Crystal Structure Analysis for Chemists and Biologists VCH, New York 1994. ISBN 978-0895732736.
