= John Lawrence Oncley =

American biochemist

John Lawrence Oncley (February 14, 1910 – July 14, 2004) was an American biochemist, and professor emeritus at University of Michigan.

== Life ==
He graduated from Southwestern College, and University of Wisconsin with a Ph.D. in 1932.

He taught at University of Michigan from 1962 to 1980.

Martha L. Ludwig was the J. Lawrence Oncley Distinguished University Professor of Biological Chemistry until she died in 2006.

== Awards ==
- 1942 ACS Award in Pure Chemistry
- He was a member of the National Academy of Sciences.
