= David E. Green =

American biochemist (1910–1983)

- Born: David Ezra Green; August 5, 1910; Brooklyn, New York, U.S.
- Died: July 8, 1983 (aged 72); Madison, Wisconsin, U.S.
- Education: New York University; University of Cambridge
- Known for: Studies of oxidative phosphorylation
- Spouse: Doris Cribb
- Children: 2, including Rowena Green Matthews
- Relatives: Tammy Baldwin (granddaughter)
- Awards: Pfizer Award in Enzyme Chemistry (1946)
- Scientific career
- Fields: Biochemistry
- Workplaces: Columbia University; University of Wisconsin–Madison
- Thesis: The Reduction Potentials of Cysteine, Glutathione and Glycylcysteine (1934)
- Doctoral advisor: Malcolm Dixon
- Doctoral students: Paul K. Stumpf

David Ezra Green (August 5, 1910 – July 8, 1983) was an American biochemist who made significant contributions to the study of enzymes, particularly the electron transport chain and oxidative phosphorylation.

== Life and career ==
Green was born in Brooklyn, New York, the son of Jennie (née Marrow) and Hyman Levy Green, a garment manufacturer. His parents were Jewish immigrants from Russia and Germany. He was awarded a degree in biology from New York University. He then moved to England and worked for eight years at the University of Cambridge under the supervision of Malcolm Dixon, on redox reactions in biological systems. He received his PhD under Dixon in 1934 with a thesis entitled The Application of Oxidation-Reduction Potentials to Biological Systems.

At the outbreak of the Second World War, Green moved back to America and established himself in a laboratory at Columbia University. Here he studied the metabolism of amino acids and the citric acid cycle. In 1948, Green moved to the University of Wisconsin–Madison and set up the Institute for Enzyme Research, making vital contributions to studies on oxidative phosphorylation, the electron transport chain and beta oxidation.

He was married to English-born Doris Cribb. He is the father of biochemist Rowena Green Matthews and grandfather of Wisconsin Senator Tammy Baldwin.
