= Cathy Drennan =

Professor of Chemistry and Biology

- Citizenship: American
- Education: Vassar College; University of Michigan
- Scientific career
- Workplaces: MIT
- Thesis: Crystallographic studies of FMN and Vitamin B12 Dependent Enzymes: Flavodoxin and Methionine Synthase
- Doctoral advisor: Martha L. Ludwig
- Other academic advisors: Douglas C. Rees
- Website: drennan.mit.edu

Catherine (Cathy) Drennan is an American biochemist and crystallographer. She is the John and Dorothy Wilson Professor of Biochemistry at the Massachusetts Institute of Technology and a professor at the Howard Hughes Medical Institute.

== Early life and education ==
Drennan grew up in New York with her parents (a medical doctor and an anthropologist). She received a bachelor's degree in chemistry from Vassar College, working in the laboratory of Professor Miriam Rossi. After college, Drennan spent time as high school science and drama teacher, in a Quaker-run school in Iowa. She received her PhD in biological chemistry from the University of Michigan in 1995, working in the laboratory of the late Professor Martha L Ludwig. Drennan's thesis is titled "Crystallographic studies of FMN and Vitamin B12 Dependent Enzymes: Flavodoxin and Methionine Synthase".

After her PhD, she joined Douglas Rees as a postdoctoral fellow in the California Institute of Technology. During her time as a postdoctoral fellow, in 1997, she started and led the undergraduate poster competition at the American Society for Biochemistry and Molecular Biology (ASBMB) annual meeting. She also served on the ASBMB Education and Professional Development Committee.

Drennan is dyslexic, but believes this has advantages in science, "don't listen to what anyone tells you what you can or cannot do...there is no dyslexia ceiling". At high school, Drennan was told "she was probably not even going to graduate high school because of her dyslexia".

== Research ==
Drennan joined the faculty at the Massachusetts Institute of Technology in 1999. At MIT, Drennan focuses on innovation in education and fundamental research. She is interested in the future of college classrooms and creating a positive learning environment for diverse groups of students. She is recognized for her contributions to science pedagogy. In 2006 Drennan was named an HHMI Professor and awarded a $1 million grant to support educational initiatives for "Getting Biologists Excited about Chemistry".

Drennan has studied enzymes that employ vitamin B12 since she was a graduate student. Her research focus is metalloproteins and metalloenzymes, and developing structural approaches to visualize enzymes, a process Drennan's lab group refers to as “structural metalloenzymology." Her group uses X-ray crystallography and electron microscopy to characterize metalloproteins in action. She is interested in conformational change during catalysis. Her work also contributes to protecting the environment, as metals act as molecular helpers in chemical reactions. Drennan is the author of over 100 Protein Data Bank submissions.

== Awards and honors ==
- 2000
  - Surdna Foundation Research Award
  - Cecil and Ida Green Career Development Chair
- 2001 - Searle Scholar
- 2002 - Presidential Early Career Award for Scientists and Engineers
- 2003 - ASBMB–Schering–Plough Research Institute Scientific Achievement Award
- 2004 - Harold E. Edgerton Faculty Achievement Award
- 2005 - Everett Moore Baker Memorial Award for Excellence in Undergraduate Teaching
- 2006 - Howard Hughes Medical Institute Professor
- 2008 - Howard Hughes Medical Institute Investigator
- 2017 - Winter Commencement Bicentennial Alumni Award
- 2020
  - American Academy of Arts and Sciences member
  - Dorothy Crowfoot Hodgkin Award, The Protein Society
- 2021- American Society for Biochemistry and Molecular Biology Fellow
- 2023
  - Structural Science Society (ACA) Fellow
  - National Academy of Sciences member
