= David Ballou =

American biochemist

David P. Ballou
- Citizenship: American
- Education: Antioch College; University of Michigan
- Known for: Presteady-state enzyme kinetics methods
- Spouse: Jean Ballou
- Scientific career
- Fields: Biochemistry
- Workplaces: University of Michigan
- Thesis: (1971)
- Doctoral advisor: Graham Palmer
- Other academic advisors: Vince Massey; Minor J. Coon

David P. Ballou is a professor emeritus of biological chemistry at the University of Michigan Medical School in the United States. He is best known for his development of rapid-reaction techniques, including stopped flow and rapid freeze-quench EPR methods, as tools to study the mechanisms of enzymes containing flavin, iron, cobalamin, or pyridoxal phosphate cofactors. Many of these studies were performed in collaboration with other scientists, most often with colleagues at Michigan.

== Biography ==
David Ballou grew up in Connecticut. He received a B.S. in chemistry from Antioch College in 1965. In 1971, he received a Ph.D. from the University of Michigan under the supervision of Graham Palmer. From 1971-1972, he was a postdoctoral fellow with Vincent Massey and Minor J. Coon at the University of Michigan. He has been a faculty member in the Department of Biological Chemistry at the University of Michigan Medical School since 1972. In 2007, Ballou became a Fellow of the American Association for the Advancement of Science in recognition of his discovery of enzyme intermediates that are involved in biological oxidation reactions. His most cited paper, l, "Oxidative Protein Folding Is Driven by the Electron Transport System", has been cited 311 times according to Google Scholar, and he has contributed to 25 papers having more than 0100 citations each.

== Books ==
- Fundamental Laboratory Approaches for Biochemistry and Biotechnology (2nd Ed) (2009) by Alexander J. Ninfa, David P. Ballou, and Marilee Benore. Published by Wiley (ISBN 978-0470087664).
