= Hispolon =

Names
- IUPAC name 6-(3,4-Dihydroxyphenyl)-4-hydroxyhexa-3,5-dien-2-one

Identifiers
| CAS Number | 173933-40-9 |
| 3D model (JSmol) | Interactive image |
| ChEMBL | ChEMBL452722 |
| ChemSpider | 24764567 |
| PubChem CID | 53395354 |
- InChI: InChI=1S/C12H12O4/c1-8(13)6-10(14)4-2-9-3-5-11(15)12(16)7-9/h2-7,14-16H,1H3 Key: QDVIEIMMEUCFMW-UHFFFAOYSA-N
- SMILES: CC(=O)C=C(C=CC1=CC(=C(C=C1)O)O)O

Properties
| Chemical formula | C_{12}H_{12}O_{4} |
| Molar mass | 220.224 g·mol^{−1} |
- Except where otherwise noted, data are given for materials in their standard state (at 25 °C [77 °F], 100 kPa). Infobox references

Hispolon is a bio-active isolate of Phellinus linteus.
