= P-hydroxybenzoate hydroxylase =

p-hydroxybenzoate hydroxylase may refer to:

- Benzoate 4-monooxygenase, an enzyme
- 4-hydroxybenzoate 3-monooxygenase, a protein
