= Jacques Ricard =

French scientist (born 1929)

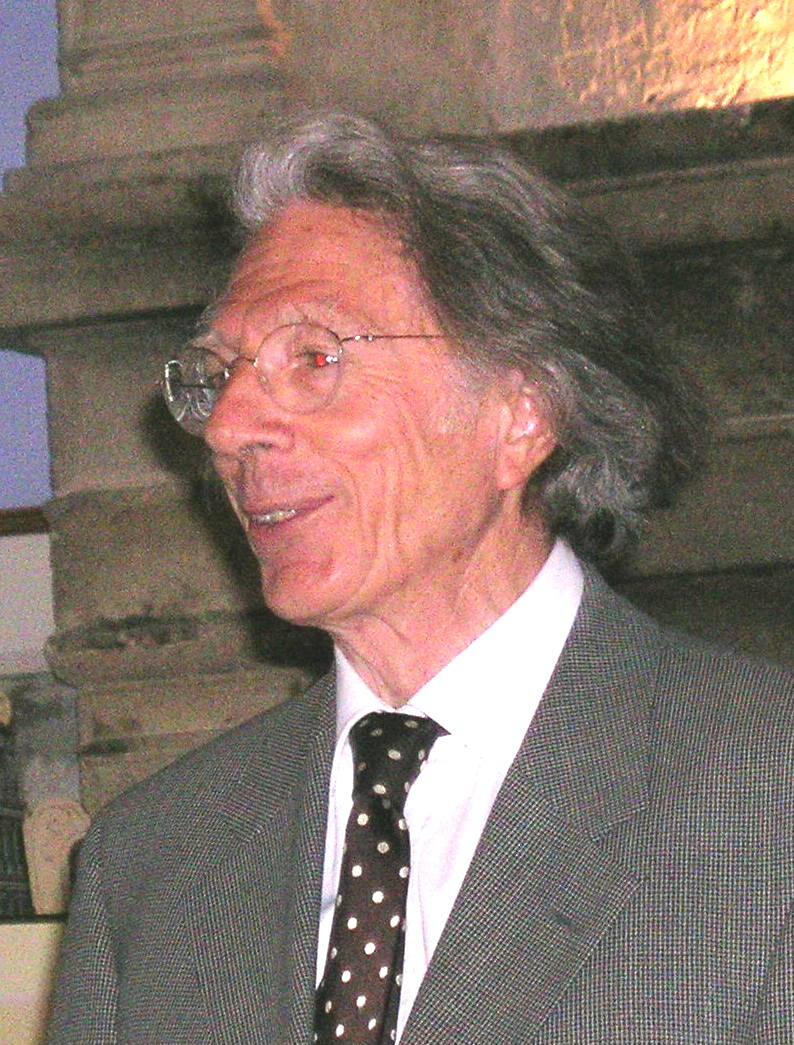
- Jacques Ricard in Lourmarin, June 2005
- Born: 6 August 1929; Marseille, France
- Died: 28 December 2018 (aged 89); Le Nayrac, Aveyron, France
- Education: Aix-Marseille University; the Sorbonne (Thèse d'État, 1957)
- Spouse: Katharina (Käty)
- Children: 1 son: Philippe
- Scientific career
- Fields: Biophysics of enzymes
- Workplaces: La Sorbonne; Cornell University; Aix-Marseille University; CNRS, Marseille; Institut Jacques Monod, Paris; University Paris Diderot
- Academic advisors: Georges Teissier

Jacques Ricard (6 August 1929 – 28 December 2018), was a French biophysicist known for studies of plant enzymes and for developing the concept of enzyme memory.

== Personal life ==
Jacques Ricard was born on 6 August 1929 in Marseille, where he spent his early life and education. After retirement he lived in Lourmarin, in the Vaucluse at the edge of the Luberon, and he died in Le Nayrac, Aveyron on 28 December 2018. He married Katharina (Käty), philosopher of science and author of Penser la Vie. They had one son, Philippe, a cardiologist.

== Education ==
Ricard studied mathematics and biology at Aix-Marseille University and the Sorbonne (Thèse d'État, 1957).

== Career ==
Ricard started his career as a young researcher in statistics in the laboratory of Georges Teissier at the Sorbonne. After a postdoctoral period at Cornell University he moved to Aix-Marseille University, where he was a lecturer and later professor of plant biochemistry. At the university he created and directed a CNRS laboratory in plant biology, later directing the CNRS Centre for Biochemistry and Molecular Biology, also in Marseille. Subsequently he moved to Paris as director of the Jacques Monod Institute, associated with the Université Paris-Diderot and the CNRS. He retired in 1999, but remained active to the end of his life, as exemplified by his book in which he explained why the whole is more than the sum of its parts. followed by another book on a similar theme published towards the end of his life.

== Research ==
During the first part of his career Ricard's research was dedicated to the study of enzymes involved in plant metabolism, including yeast hexokinase, a collaboration with R. J. P. Williams on turnip peroxidases, and other work on peroxidases.

A long-term interest in allosteric and cooperative behaviour led to a retrospective review two decades after the principal models of cooperativity were established.

The study of yeast hexokinase led to what became a major interest, the development of the "mnemonical model" as an example of enzyme memory, later extended to multienzyme systems, following a discovery that five enzymes of the Calvin cycle existed as a complex in chloroplasts.

In the light of his textbook he became a member of the panel that prepared the current IUBMB recommendations on enzyme kinetics.

In 1983 Ricard organized, with Athel Cornish-Bowden, a NATO Advanced Research Workshop in Marseille on Dynamics of Biochemical Systems in which several notable scientists participated: Keith Dalziel, Albert Goldbeter, Mario Markus, Peter Schuster.

After his formal retirement Ricard became increasingly interested in applying his training in mathematics to general questions of complexity and the origin and definition of life.

== Honours ==
Jacques Ricard was elected corresponding member of the Académie des Sciences in 1990, in the section of integrative biology.
