= Robert Singer =

Robert Singer may refer to:

- Robert Singer (American politician) (born 1947)
- Robert Singer (Jewish leader) (born 1956)
- Robert Singer (producer), American television producer
- Robert H. Singer, American molecular biologist
- Bob Singer (born 1928), American animation artist
- Bobby Singer, a fictional character in the television series Supernatural
