= Olivier Civelli =

Molecular biologist

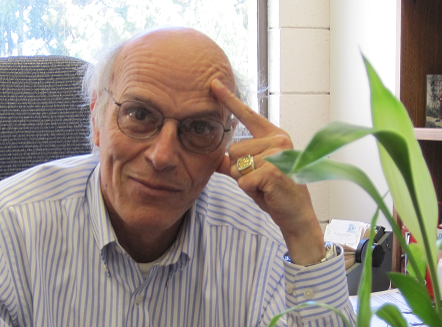
- Occupations: Molecular biologist, neuroscientist and educator
- Title: Eric L. and Lila D. Nelson Professor of Neuropharmacology

Academic background
- Education: Swiss Federal Institute of Technology

Academic work
- Institutions: Oregon Health Sciences University, Portland; Oregon University of California, Irvine

Olivier Civelli is a molecular biologist, a researcher in the field of neuropharmacology and an educator. He is the Eric L. and Lila D. Nelson Professor of Neuropharmacology at University of California, Irvine. He is also a Professor in the Department of Developmental and Cell Biology at University of California, Irvine. He is most known for his work in advancing understanding of neurotransmission and his impact on drug discovery.

Civelli's research is focused on understanding brain function and the identification and study of novel molecules involved in brain activity. He was the first to decipher the structure of a dopamine receptor, the D2 receptor, central to neurobiology. He also uncovered the diversity of dopamine receptor family, identifying the D1 and D5 receptors and discovered the D4 receptor, of importance in psychiatry. Civelli then invented the strategy that uses orphan receptors to discover new neurotransmitters referred to as reverse pharmacology. Utilizing this strategy, he was the first to identify a novel neuropeptide, orphanin FQ (Nociceptin) in 1995, which he showed to regulate anxiety. He has written over 450 papers and holds 30 patents.

In 2004, Nature Drug Discovery recognized him as one of the world's 20 leading experts on GPCR research and The Scientist featured him in Hooked on a Hunt in 2008. In 2015, he was awarded the Chinese Academy of Sciences President’s International Fellowship Initiative for Visiting Scientists.

== Early life and education ==
Civelli was born in Fribourg, Switzerland. He received his undergraduate and Ph.D. degrees at the Swiss Federal Institute of Technology in Zurich. The research for his thesis was done at the Institut Jacques Monod in Paris under the supervision of Klaus Scherrer. He then worked as postdoctoral fellow on the discovery of opioid peptide precursors at the University of Oregon, Eugene, with Edward Herbert.

== Career ==
In 1985, Civelli joined the Oregon Health & Science University, Portland, Oregon, as a research assistant professor, and was a founding member of the Vollum Institute. It is there that he cloned the dopamine receptors and discovered their diversity.

Civelli joined F. Hoffmann-La Roche, Basel in 1992 as vice president and developed the reverse pharmacology approach that allowed him to discover novel neuropeptides. He returned to academia as the Eric L. and Lila D. Nelson professor of neuropharmacology at the University of California, Irvine in 1996. From 2012 to 2019, he was the Chair of Department of Pharmacology at UC Irvine.

=== Research and work ===
Civelli's research is focused on understanding brain function and the identification and study of novel molecules involved in brain activity. He has conducted research in the area of molecular psychiatry, G protein-coupled receptors, neuropeptides, orphan receptors, novel neurotransmitters, dopamine receptors, orphanin FQ/nociceptin, MCH, and traditional Chinese medicines.

In the mid-1980s, Civelli’s research pioneered the identification of new neurotransmitter receptors by applying the homology screening approach to G-protein coupled receptors, an approach which ultimately led to cloning of most of the G protein-coupled receptor families. This development led Civelli to be the first to characterize structurally a dopamine receptor, the D2 receptor. This discovery opened the search for additional dopamine receptors, and, in the subsequent years, Civelli discovered and described the unexpected diversity of dopamine receptors by successively cloning the D1, D4 and D5 receptors. His discovery of the D4 receptor suggested that this receptor may have a particular affinity for the atypical neuroleptic clozapine. Civelli's research in this period did not focus solely on dopamine receptors; he also discovered the adenosine A3 receptor.

By cloning G protein-coupled receptors on the basis of their genomic sequences, Civelli had faced receptors that were not matched to their ligands, the so-called orphan receptors. He recognized that some orphan receptors will not match to known ligands and consequently that they will bind novel neurotransmitters or neuropeptides. So he devised a 'reverse pharmacology'. In 1995, he was first to discover a novel neuropeptide by using an orphan receptor as target. He named this novel neuropeptide orphanin FQ (OFQ, also known as nociceptin). It is similar in sequence to the opioid peptides. Civelli showed that OFQ does not act on opioid receptors and, in a series of pharmacological analyses, showed that the opioid and OFQ systems have diverged through evolution to prevent crosstalk. He furthermore showed that OFQ blocks stress-induced analgesia, and more importantly, that OFQ is anxiolytic, an activity that he assessed further by generating OFQ knock-out mice.

Civelli has then pursued his search for novel transmitters by applying the strategy that he devised to additional orphan receptors. In doing so he was able to find that two particular orphan GPCRs were indeed receptors for melanin-concentrating hormone (MCH) and urotensin II. Then, he uncovered the physiological roles of another novel neuropeptide, NPS. More recently he has applied his approach to the discovery of active compounds in traditional medicines and has identified dihydrocorybulbine as a novel analgesic.

The reverse pharmacological strategy that Civelli devised has since been used worldwide to discover several more peptides (in particular the orexins and ghrelin) and has had major impact on drug discovery.

== Awards and honors ==
- 1989 - Pfizer traveling fellow award, Clinical Research Institute of Montreal
- 1991 - Distinguished Speaker, Department of Pharmacology, University of Toronto
- 1992 - Robert and Adele Blank Lectureship, New York University Medical Center
- 1992 - Presidential Lecture, Annual Meeting of the Society for Neuroscience
- 2002 - Athalie Clarke Research Award, University of California, Irvine
- 2006 - ISI Highly Cited Researcher
- 2015-17 - Chinese Academy of Sciences President’s International Fellowship Initiative for Visiting Scientists

== Publications ==
=== Books edited ===
- Civelli O and Zhou Q.Y. Orphan G protein-coupled receptors and novel neuropeptides (2008) Results and Problems in Cell Differentiation. 46, Springer Verlag, Berlin

=== Selected articles ===
- Bunzow, J.R., Van Tol, H.H., Grandy, D.K., Albert, P., Salon, J., Christie, M., Machida, C., Neve, K.A. and Civelli, O. (1988) Cloning and expression of a rat D2 dopamine receptor cDNA. Nature, 336:783-787.
- Zhou, Q.Y., Grandy, D.K., Thambi, L., Kushner, J., Van Tol, H.H.M., Cone, R., Pribnow, D., Salon, J., Bunzow, J.R. and Civelli, O. (1990) Cloning and expression of human and rat D1 dopamine receptors. Nature, 347:76-80.
- Van Tol, H.H.M., Bunzow, J.R., Guan, H.C., Sunahara, R.K., Seeman, P., Niznik, H.B. and Civelli, O. (1991) Cloning of the gene for a human dopamine D4 receptor with high affinity for the antipsychotic clozapine. Nature, 350:610-614.
- Grandy, D.K., Zhang, Y., Bouvier, C., Zhou, Q.Y., Johnson, R.A., Allen, L., Buck, K., Bunzow, J.R., Salon, J. and Civelli, O. (1991) Multiple human D5 dopamine receptor genes: A functional receptor and two pseudogenes. Proceedings of the National Academy of Sciences, USA, 88:9175-9179.
- Zhou, Q.Y., Li, C., Olah, M.E., Johnson, R.A., Stiles, G.L. and Civelli, O. (1992) Molecular cloning and characterization of an adenosine receptor: The A3 adenosine receptor. Proceedings of the National Academy of Sciences, USA, 89:7432-7436.
- Reinscheid, R.K., Nothacker, H.P., Bourson, A., Ardati, A., Henningsen, R. A., Bunzow, J.R., Grandy, D.K., Langen, H., Monsma, F.J. and Civelli, O. (1995) Orphanin FQ: A neuropeptide that activates an opioid-like G protein-coupled receptor. Science, 270:792-794.
- Saito, Y., Nothacker, H.P., Wang, Z., Lin, S.H.S., Leslie, F. and Civelli, O. (1999) Molecular characterization of the melanin-concentrating-hormone receptor. Nature, 400:265-269.
- Nothacker, H.P., Wang, Z., McNeill, A.M., Saito, Y., Merten, S., O’Dowd, B., Duckles, S.P. and Civelli, O. (1999) Identification of the natural ligand of an orphan G-protein-coupled receptor involved in the regulation of vasoconstriction. Nature Cell Biology, 1:383-385.
- Xu, Y.L., Reinscheid, R.K., Huitron-Resendiz, S., Clark, S.D., Wang, Z, Lin, S.H., Brucher, F.A., Zeng, J., Ly, N.K, Henriksen, S.J., de Lecea, L., and Civelli, O. (2004). Neuropeptide S: a neuropeptide promoting arousal and anxiolytic-like effects Neuron 43:487-497.
- Zhang Y, Wang C, Wang L, Parks GS, Zhang X, Guo Z, Ke Y, Li KW, Kim MK, Vo B, Borrelli E, Ge G, Yang L, Wang Z, Garcia-Fuster MJ, Luo ZD, Liang X, Civelli O (2014) A Novel Analgesic Isolated from a Traditional Chinese Medicine. Curr Biol. 2014 24 1-7.
