= IJM =

IJM may refer to:

- IJM Corporation, a company in Malaysia
- ImageJ Macro language, a programming language
- International Justice Mission, a non-profit human rights organization
- Institut Jacques Monod, a research institute in Paris, France
- Illinois Journal of Mathematics
- Israel Journal of Mathematics
