= Klaus Scherrer =

French biologist of Swiss nationality (born 1931)

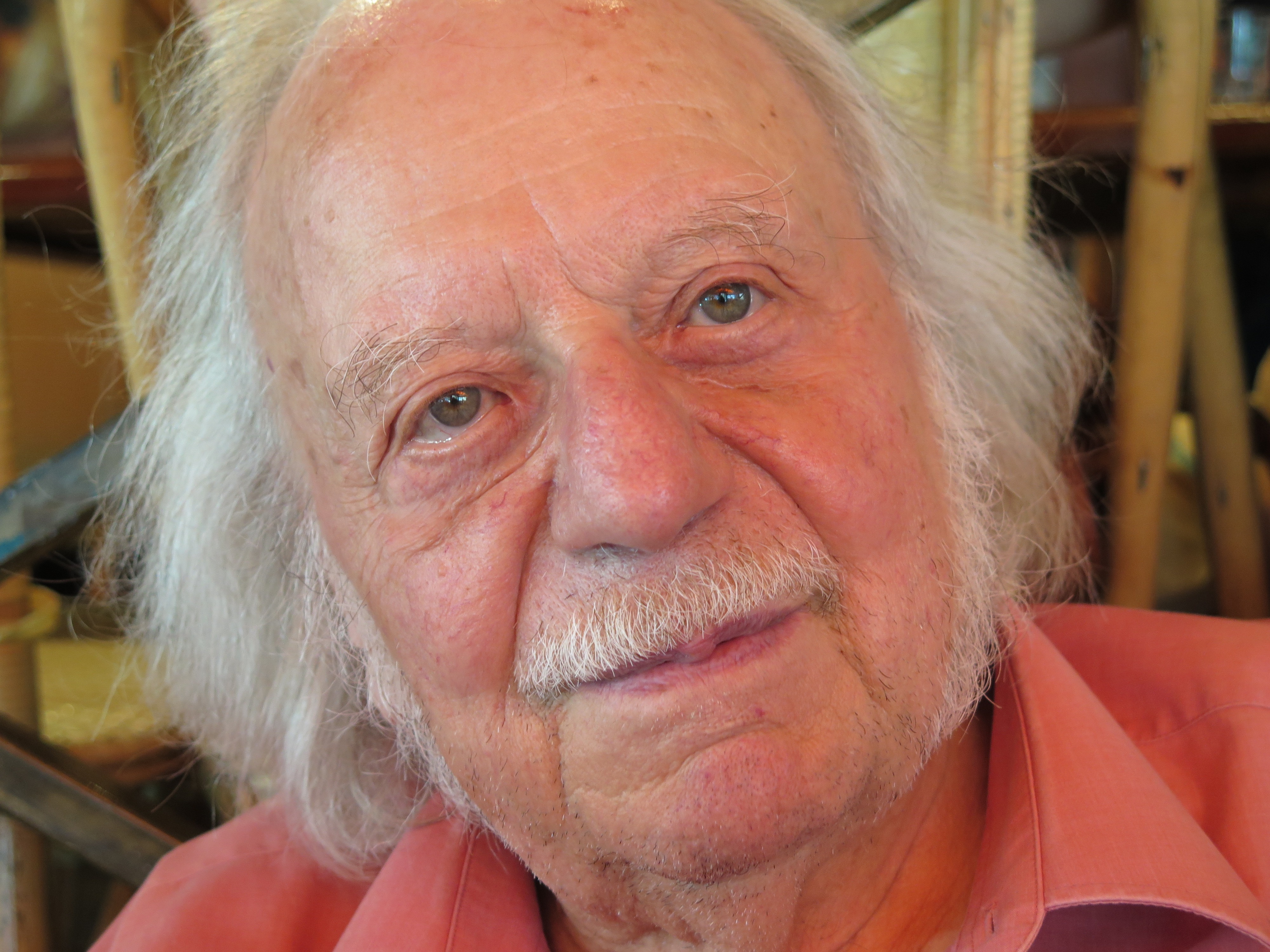
- Born: December 10, 1931 (age 94); Schaffhausen, Switzerland
- Citizenship: French, Swiss
- Education: Swiss Institute of Technology, Zurich (ETH)
- Known for: RNA/Genome organization and expression
- Spouses: Jutta Scherrer (m. 1961; div. 1978) Tereza Imaizumi-Scherrer (m. 1978)
- Children: 1
- Scientific career
- Fields: Chemistry; Molecular Biology
- Workplaces: Swiss Cancer Centre; Institut Jacques Monod

Klaus Scherrer (born 10 December 1931, in Schaffhausen) is a French biologist of Swiss nationality. He is emeritus research director for the CNRS, member of EMBO, member of the academia Europaea and the Brazilian Academy of Sciences. He is Professor honoris causa of the University of Brasília.

== Biography ==
Scherrer obtained his PhD in biochemistry from Swiss Institute of Technology, Zurich (ETH). He worked as a research assistant for James Darnell at MIT, where in 1962 he discovered the existence of giant pre-ribosomal and pre-messenger RNA in animal cells and observed for the first time the processing of pre-ribosomal RNA (pre-rRNA) into functional rRNA. These discoveries made it possible to understand a fundamental process in nucleated cells, the synthesis of precursor RNA that is then metabolized in order to extract the information to be expressed. With Sheldon Penman, he demonstrated the existence of messenger RNA in polyribosomes.

In 1963, he joined François Gros at the Institut Pasteur and, later, at the Institut de biologie physico-chimique (IBPC) in Paris, before founding in 1967, the molecular biology department at the Swiss Institute for Experimental Cancer Research (ISREC) in Lausanne.

At the IBPC, he studied the structure of giant RNA of the messenger type in cell differentiation (avian erythroblasts) and formulated the hypothesis of the existence of pre-messenger pre-mRNA by analogy to pre-rRNA.

At ISREC he pursued the study of pre-rRNA and pre-mRNA, and extended his research to RNA-protein complexes (RNPs) of the pre-mRNP type, and of cytoplasmic mRNPs in active and repressed forms. Associated to the latter, he discovered with Nicole Granboulan the prosomes, a "20S"-complex (with Mr around 720,000) built of 28 protein sub-units in a variable mosaic, associated to repressed mRNP of the cytoplasm, as well as to the pre-mRNP and the chromatin. Later, the same 20S particles were also identified (by other researchers) as the core of "26S"-proteasomes, where they are associated with 19S modules that regulate the enzymatic activity in relation to the ubiquitin-system.

Back to France, he was nominated directeur de recherche at the CNRS and worked at Institut Jacques Monod where he develops from 1973 to 2001 the analysis of primary transcripts (pre-mRNA) and of their metabolism into RNA, functional in polyribosomes. He also studied prosome as regulating modules associated to pre-mRNA and to mRNA at the level of chromatine and the cytoskeleton. Based on the compositional variation of the 20S-particle in relation to physiology and pathology of cells, he developed a system of clinic diagnostics within the start-up ProSoma, SARL.

At the theoretical level, Klaus Scherrer formulated, from 1964 onwards, the Cascade Regulation Hypothesis (CRH), which represents an attempt to integrate within a single schematic frame the theoretical requirements and the experimental observations that concern the regulation of protein synthesis in the eukaryotic cells. His research on the genomic DNA paved the way to the first tri-dimensional molecular model of genomic DNA. He proposed for the first time an interpretation for the 98% of DNA not-coding for proteins (non-coding DNA) in terms of functional architecture. In collaboration with the mathematician Jürgen Jost, he proposed an analysis of gene expressions based on information theory.

Based on biochemical and molecular-biological methods, pushed to their technological limits, Scherrer's early results were obtained before the advent of modern DNA technology and were thus met, at the time, with apprehension. However, since around 2005, modern post-genomic methods (ENCODE, high-C 3D-DNA analysis) have confirmed the early results and interpretations. Eukaryotic genomes being transcribed to up to 90%, the 1962 observations turned out to be the key mechanisms of gene expression.

In 1972, Scherrer founded the "Arolla EMBO Workshops"; he also translated into German (in collaboration with Jutta Scherrer) "The logic of Life" by François Jacob.
