= Estaing, Aveyron =

Commune in Occitanie, France

Estaing Estanh (Occitan)
- Commune
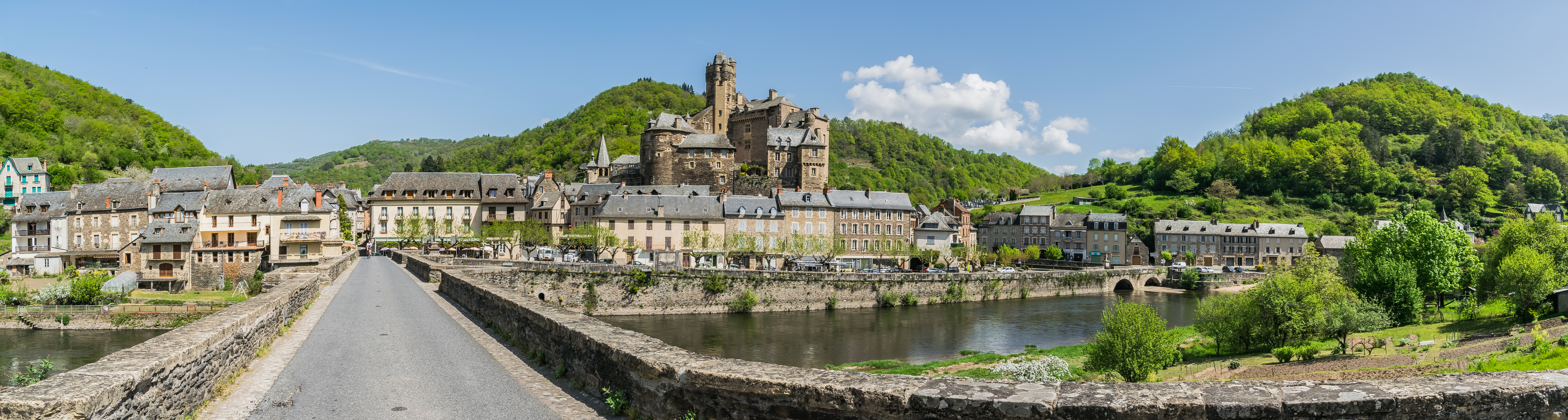
- A view of Estaing

- Coat of arms
- Location of Estaing
- Location within France Location within Occitanie
- Coordinates: 44°33′22″N 2°40′21″E
- Country: France
- Region: Occitania
- Department: Aveyron
- Arrondissement: Rodez
- Canton: Lot et Truyère

Government
  - Mayor (2020–2026): Nathalie Couseran
- Area^{1}: 16.96 km^{2} (6.55 sq mi)
- Elevation: 300 m (980 ft)
- Highest elevation: 760 m (2,490 ft)
- Lowest elevation: 301 m (988 ft)
- Population (2023): 502
  - Density: 29.6/km^{2} (76.7/sq mi)
- Time zone: UTC+01:00 (CET)
  - Summer (DST): UTC+02:00 (CEST)
- INSEE/Postal code: 12098 /12190
- ^{1} French Land Register data, which excludes lakes, ponds, glaciers > 1 km^{2} (0.386 sq mi or 247 acres) and river estuaries.

Estaing (French pronunciation: [ɛstɛ̃]; Occitan: Estanh) is a commune in the Aveyron department in the Occitanie region of Southern France. The D'Estaing family, first mentioned in writings in 1028, was one of the most powerful families of the Rouergue from the 13th to the 18th century, making the village known throughout France.

== Geography ==
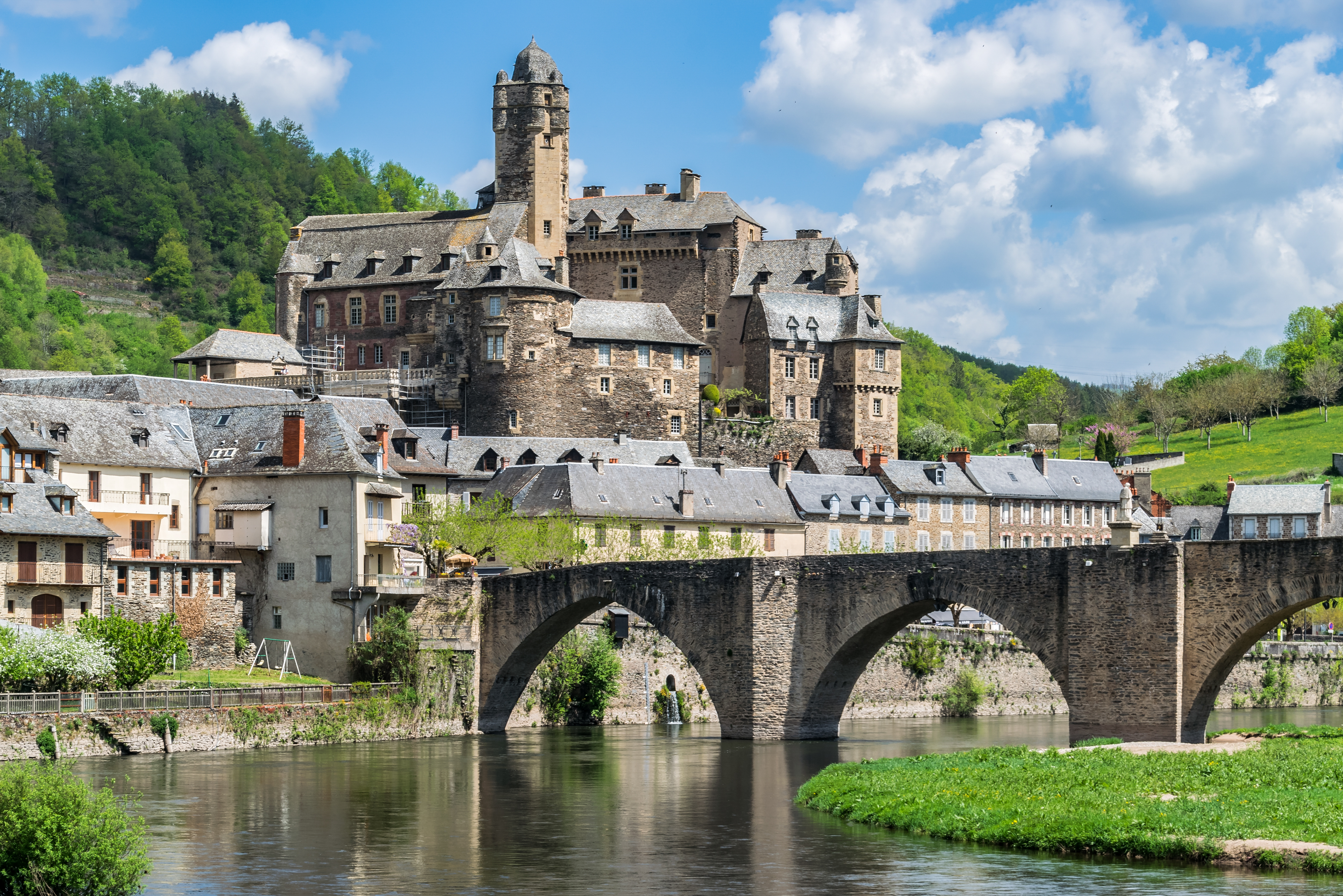
Estaing and the Lot River

Located in the north of the Aveyron department, Estaing is considered one of the most picturesque villages in France. It one of the ten villages of Aveyron that are part of the Les Plus Beaux Villages de France association ("the most beautiful villages of France"). The village is very quiet during the winter months; it is in the summer that it shows the most signs of life. Lying at 320 metres above sea level, the winters are cool and the summers are hot and dry.

The bridge over the river Lot in Estaing has been part of the UNESCO World Heritage Site of the Routes of Santiago de Compostela in France since the site's designation in 1998. Espalion is a ten-minute drive away, while Rodez is about 50 minutes away.

== Population ==
Historical population
Year	Pop.	±% p.a.
1968	718	—
1975	667	−1.05%
1982	666	−0.02%
1990	665	−0.02%
1999	612	−0.92%
2007	610	−0.04%
2012	593	−0.56%
2017	473	−4.42%
2023	502	+1.00%
Source: INSEE

== Personality ==
- d'Estaing family
- Urbain Hémard, doctor and dentist of the bishop Georges d'Armagnac, banished from Rodez for having favoured the Ligueurs in 1589, came to find refuge in Estaing and died there on 14 October 1592.

== See also ==
- Communes of the Aveyron department
