= Civelli =

Civelli is a surname.

== List of people with the surname ==
- Alison Zerafa Civelli, Maltese politician
- Luciano Civelli (born 1986), Argentine retired footballer
- Olivier Civelli, American biologist
- Renato Civelli (born 1983), Argentine retired footballer

== See also ==
- Civilian
