= Le Nayrac =

Commune in Occitanie, France

- Commune
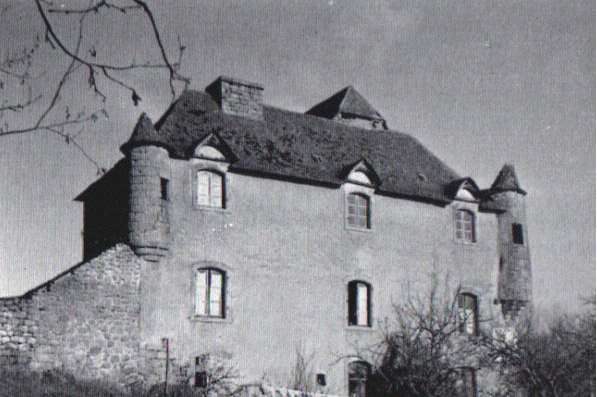
- The Chateau of Freyssinet, in Nayrac
- Location of Le Nayrac
- Location within France Location within Occitanie
- Coordinates: 44°36′50″N 2°39′50″E
- Country: France
- Region: Occitania
- Department: Aveyron
- Arrondissement: Rodez
- Canton: Lot et Truyère

Government
  - Mayor (2020–2026): Jean-Louis Raynaldy
- Area^{1}: 36.57 km^{2} (14.12 sq mi)
- Elevation: 707 m (2,320 ft)
- Highest elevation: 848 m (2,782 ft)
- Lowest elevation: 260 m (850 ft)
- Population (2023): 555
  - Density: 15.2/km^{2} (39.3/sq mi)
- Time zone: UTC+01:00 (CET)
  - Summer (DST): UTC+02:00 (CEST)
- INSEE/Postal code: 12172 /12190
- ^{1} French Land Register data, which excludes lakes, ponds, glaciers > 1 km^{2} (0.386 sq mi or 247 acres) and river estuaries.

Le Nayrac (French pronunciation: [lə nɛʁak]; Occitan: Lo Nairac) is a commune in the Aveyron department in southern France.

== Population ==
Historical population
Year	Pop.	±% p.a.
1968	639	—
1975	624	−0.34%
1982	660	+0.80%
1990	581	−1.58%
1999	570	−0.21%
2007	565	−0.11%
2012	523	−1.53%
2017	512	−0.42%
2023	555	+1.35%
Source: INSEE

== Notable people ==
- Jacques Ricard (1929–2018), biophysicist, died in Le Nayrac

== See also ==
- Communes of the Aveyron department
