= Canton of Lot et Truyère =

Coordinates: 44.52°N 2.76°E

- Canton
- Situation of the canton of Lot et Truyère in the department of Aveyron
- Country: France
- Region: Occitania
- Department: Aveyron
- No. of communes: {{{nbcomm}}}
- Population (2023): 10,210
- INSEE code: 1210

The canton of Lot et Truyère is an administrative division of the Aveyron department, southern France. It was created at the French canton reorganisation which came into effect in March 2015. Its seat is in Espalion.

It consists of the following communes:

1. Bessuéjouls
2. Campuac
3. Le Cayrol
4. Coubisou
5. Entraygues-sur-Truyère
6. Espalion
7. Espeyrac
8. Estaing
9. Le Fel
10. Golinhac
11. Le Nayrac
12. Saint-Hippolyte
13. Sébrazac
14. Villecomtal
