= Golinhac =

Commune in Occitanie, France

- Commune
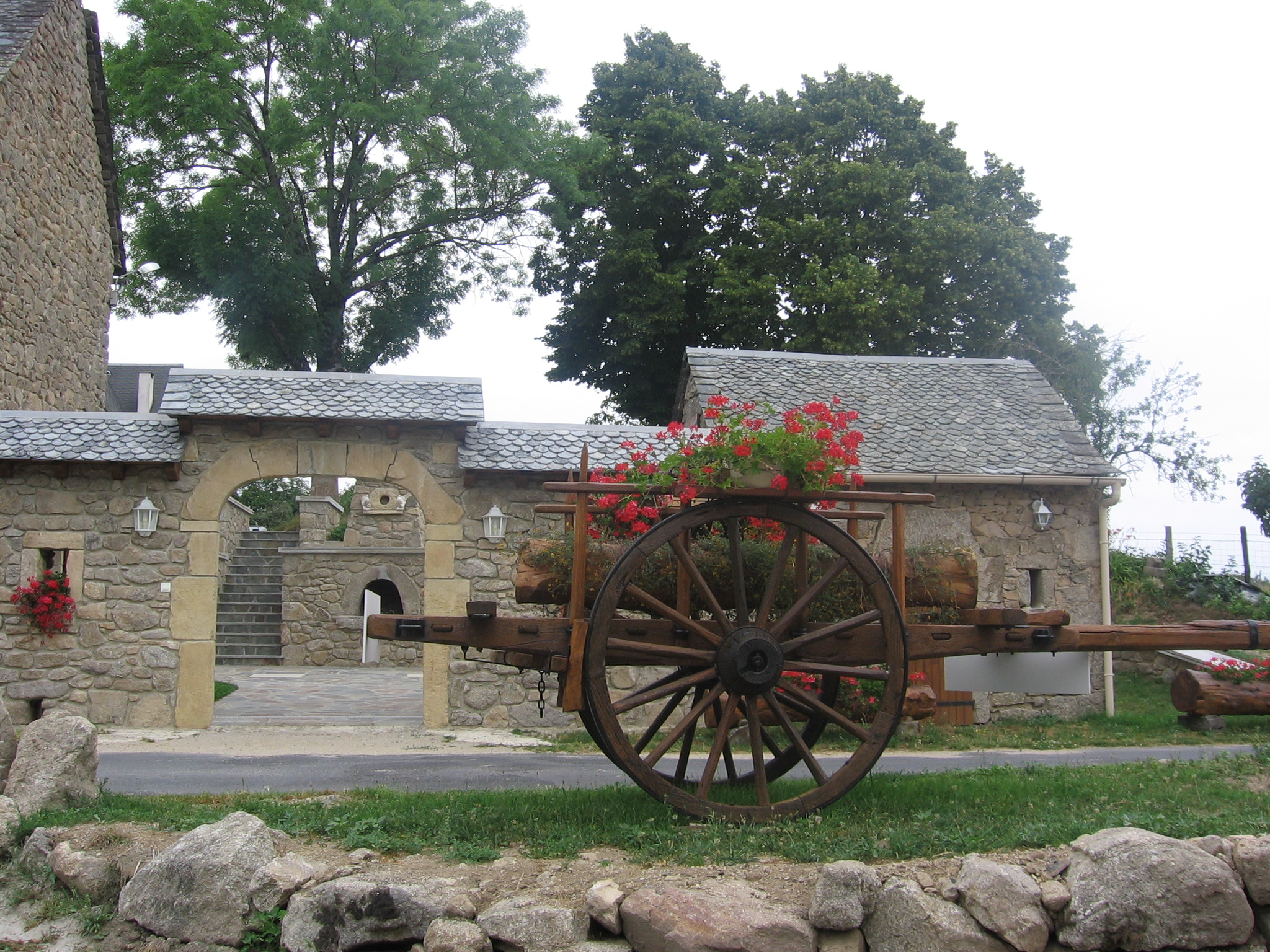
- Via Podiensis

- Coat of arms
- Location of Golinhac
- Location within France Location within Occitanie
- Coordinates: 44°36′19″N 2°35′03″E
- Country: France
- Region: Occitania
- Department: Aveyron
- Arrondissement: Rodez
- Canton: Lot et Truyère

Government
  - Mayor (2020–2026): Alexandre Benezet
- Area^{1}: 32.41 km^{2} (12.51 sq mi)
- Elevation: 650 m (2,130 ft)
- Highest elevation: 694 m (2,277 ft)
- Lowest elevation: 229 m (751 ft)
- Population (2023): 370
  - Density: 11/km^{2} (30/sq mi)
- Time zone: UTC+01:00 (CET)
  - Summer (DST): UTC+02:00 (CEST)
- INSEE/Postal code: 12110 /12140
- ^{1} French Land Register data, which excludes lakes, ponds, glaciers > 1 km^{2} (0.386 sq mi or 247 acres) and river estuaries.

Golinhac is a commune in the Aveyron department in southern France.

== Population ==
Historical population
Year	Pop.	±% p.a.
1968	532	—
1975	475	−1.61%
1982	472	−0.09%
1990	458	−0.38%
1999	392	−1.71%
2007	440	+1.45%
2012	383	−2.74%
2017	336	−2.58%
2023	370	+1.62%
Source: INSEE

== See also ==
- Communes of the Aveyron department
