= Saint-Hippolyte, Aveyron =

Commune in Occitanie, France

Saint-Hippolyte
- Commune
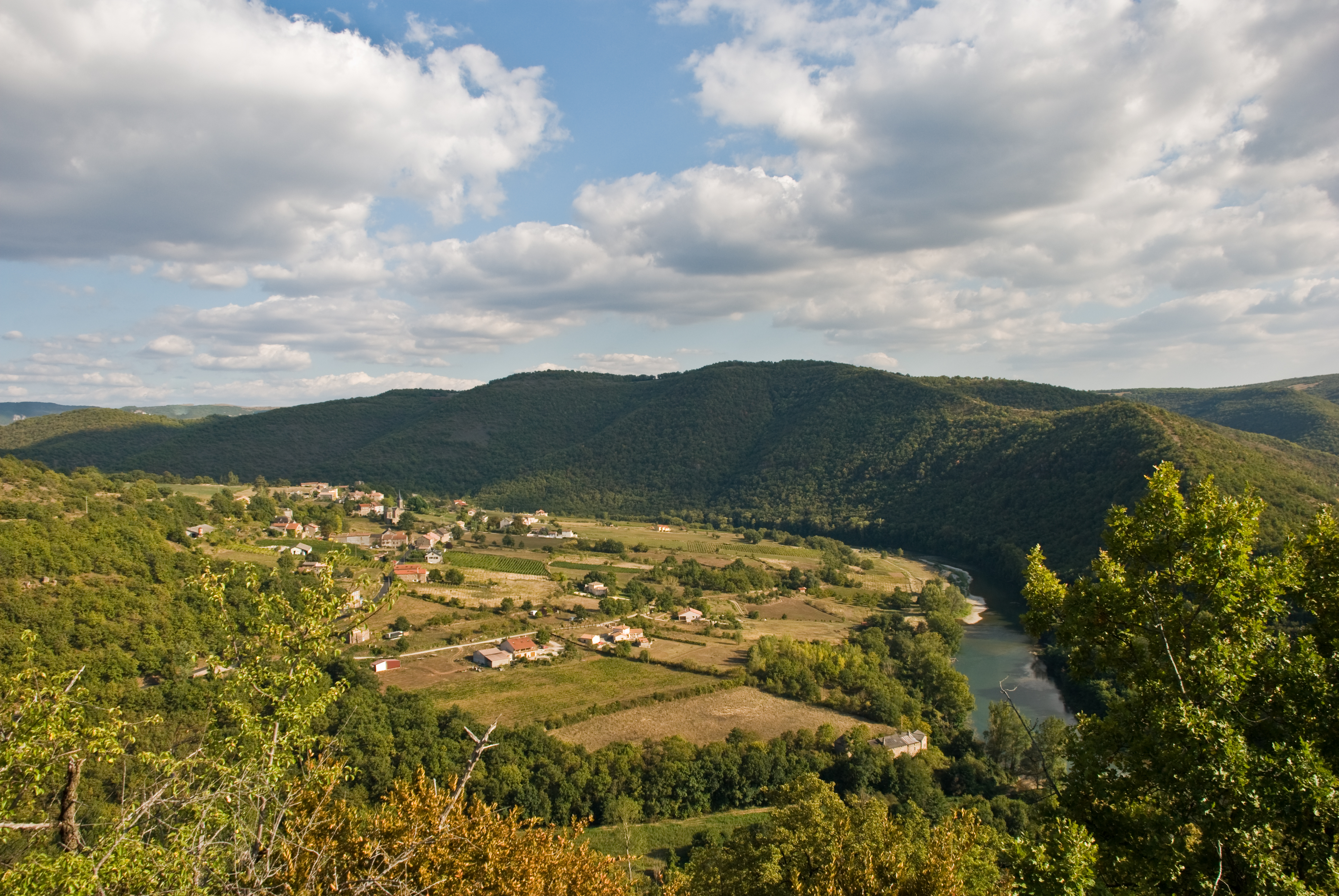
- The Truyère Valley at Saint-Hippolyte
- Location of Saint-Hippolyte
- Location within France Location within Occitanie
- Coordinates: 44°42′43″N 2°35′33″E
- Country: France
- Region: Occitania
- Department: Aveyron
- Arrondissement: Rodez
- Canton: Lot et Truyère

Government
  - Mayor (2020–2026): Francine Lafon
- Area^{1}: 36.87 km^{2} (14.24 sq mi)
- Elevation: 675 m (2,215 ft)
- Highest elevation: 785 m (2,575 ft)
- Lowest elevation: 228 m (748 ft)
- Population (2023): 428
  - Density: 11.6/km^{2} (30.1/sq mi)
- Time zone: UTC+01:00 (CET)
  - Summer (DST): UTC+02:00 (CEST)
- INSEE/Postal code: 12226 /12140
- ^{1} French Land Register data, which excludes lakes, ponds, glaciers > 1 km^{2} (0.386 sq mi or 247 acres) and river estuaries.

Saint-Hippolyte (French pronunciation: [sɛ̃.t‿ipɔlit]; Occitan: Sent Ipòli) is a commune in the Aveyron department in southern France.

== Population ==
Historical population
Year	Pop.	±% p.a.
1968	825	—
1975	677	−2.78%
1982	685	+0.17%
1990	541	−2.91%
1999	500	−0.87%
2007	458	−1.09%
2012	444	−0.62%
2017	435	−0.41%
2023	428	−0.27%
Source: INSEE

== See also ==
- Communes of the Aveyron department
