= Bessuéjouls =

Commune in Occitanie, France

- Commune
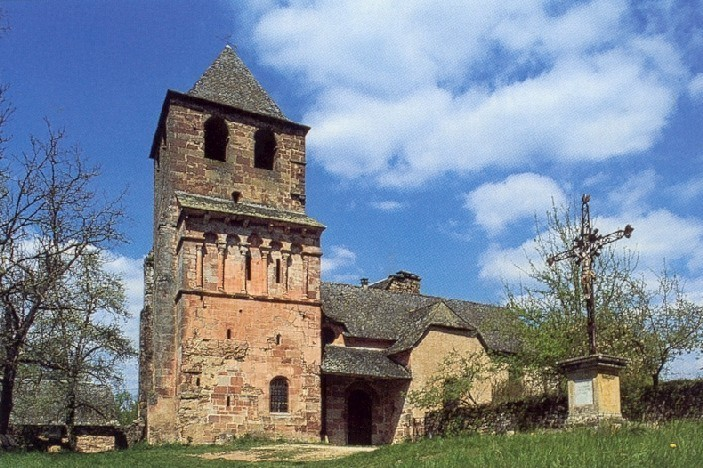
- The church in Bessuéjouls
- Location of Bessuéjouls
- Location within France Location within Occitanie
- Coordinates: 44°31′37″N 2°43′42″E
- Country: France
- Region: Occitania
- Department: Aveyron
- Arrondissement: Rodez
- Canton: Lot et Truyère

Government
  - Mayor (2020–2026): Georges Escalié
- Area^{1}: 11.29 km^{2} (4.36 sq mi)
- Elevation: 330 m (1,080 ft)
- Highest elevation: 660 m (2,170 ft)
- Lowest elevation: 319 m (1,047 ft)
- Population (2023): 222
  - Density: 19.7/km^{2} (50.9/sq mi)
- Time zone: UTC+01:00 (CET)
  - Summer (DST): UTC+02:00 (CEST)
- INSEE/Postal code: 12027 /12500
- ^{1} French Land Register data, which excludes lakes, ponds, glaciers > 1 km^{2} (0.386 sq mi or 247 acres) and river estuaries.

Bessuéjouls (French pronunciation: [bɛsɥeʒul]; Occitan: Bessuèjols) is a commune in the Aveyron department in southern France.

== Population ==
Historical population
Year	Pop.	±% p.a.
1968	279	—
1975	252	−1.44%
1982	211	−2.50%
1990	224	+0.75%
1999	225	+0.05%
2007	227	+0.11%
2012	250	+1.95%
2017	213	−3.15%
2023	222	+0.69%
Source: INSEE

== See also ==
- Communes of the Aveyron department
