= Sheldon Penman =

American cell biologist (1930–2021)

- Born: July 24, 1930; Philadelphia, Pennsylvania, U.S.
- Died: September 27, 2021 (aged 91)
- Known for: RNA biosynthesis; nuclear architecture; cytoskeleton and gene expression
- Awards: E. B. Wilson Medal (1994)
- Scientific career
- Fields: Cell biology, molecular biology
- Institutions: University of Chicago; Columbia University; Albert Einstein College of Medicine; Massachusetts Institute of Technology

Sheldon Penman (July 24, 1930 – September 27, 2021) was an American cell biologist whose research focused on cellular architecture and gene expression. Initially trained in physics, he moved into molecular and cell biology and held faculty positions at the University of Chicago, Columbia University, the Albert Einstein College of Medicine, and the Massachusetts Institute of Technology. He was one of the founding editors of the journal Cell in 1974.

== Early life and education ==
Penman was born in Philadelphia on July 24, 1930. He received his Ph.D in physics from Columbia University in 1958.

== Career ==
Penman held faculty positions in physics at the University of Chicago and Columbia University, before he joined the Albert Einstein College of Medicine in 1961.

In 1981, the Whitehead Institute was proposed to be affiliated with MIT as a separate, endowed biomedical research institute, but with shared faculty; The New York Times described Penman as "an archfoe of the terms of Mr. Whitehead's proposal". Penman was one of 33 MIT faculty members who signed a letter expressing concern about the proposed relationship between MIT and the Whitehead Institute. One of Penman's obituaries characterized his opposition as being based on a significant concern that the faculty had about corporate influence in academic science.

Penman mentored many students and postdoctoral researchers, including Michael Rosbash, Robert H. Singer, and Zhai Zhonghe.

== Research and professional service ==
Penman's early work included theoretical and practical contributions in physics, before his transition to biology. He authored a 1961 article in Scientific American entitled The Muon, describing the state of knowledge at that time about the muon particle. During his transition from physics to biology, Penman and collaborators including William Daniel Phillips applied nuclear magnetic resonance (NMR) to show that nucleic acid secondary structure, hybridization, and melting behavior could be detected in solution, and NMR could be used to assess if the nucleic acid is single-stranded, base-paired, hybridized, or melted.

After shifting his focus to biology, he contributed to the first demonstration of messenger RNA in a mammalian cell. He then developed methods for isolating HeLa cell nucleoli and used them to study RNA synthesis in nucleolar and nucleoplasmic domains. This led to a characterization of rRNA biosynthesis and it contributed to an understanding of rRNA processing. Penman's studies of heterogeneous nuclear RNA helped support later work on RNA splicing. With his colleague Robert Weinberg he identified small nuclear RNAs. And with Klaus Scherrer, Yechiel Becker, and James Darnell, Penman described the presence of messenger RNA in polyribosomes.

Penman was a founding editor of the journal Cell in 1974.

== Honors ==
Penman's honors included the following:

- Member of the National Academy of Sciences (1986).
- Member of the American Academy of Arts and Sciences (1975).
- Shared the 1994 E. B. Wilson Medal of the American Society for Cell Biology with James Darnell.

== Death ==
Penman died September 27, 2021, at age 91 and was survived by his son Joshua.
