= Campuac =

Commune in Occitanie, France

- Commune
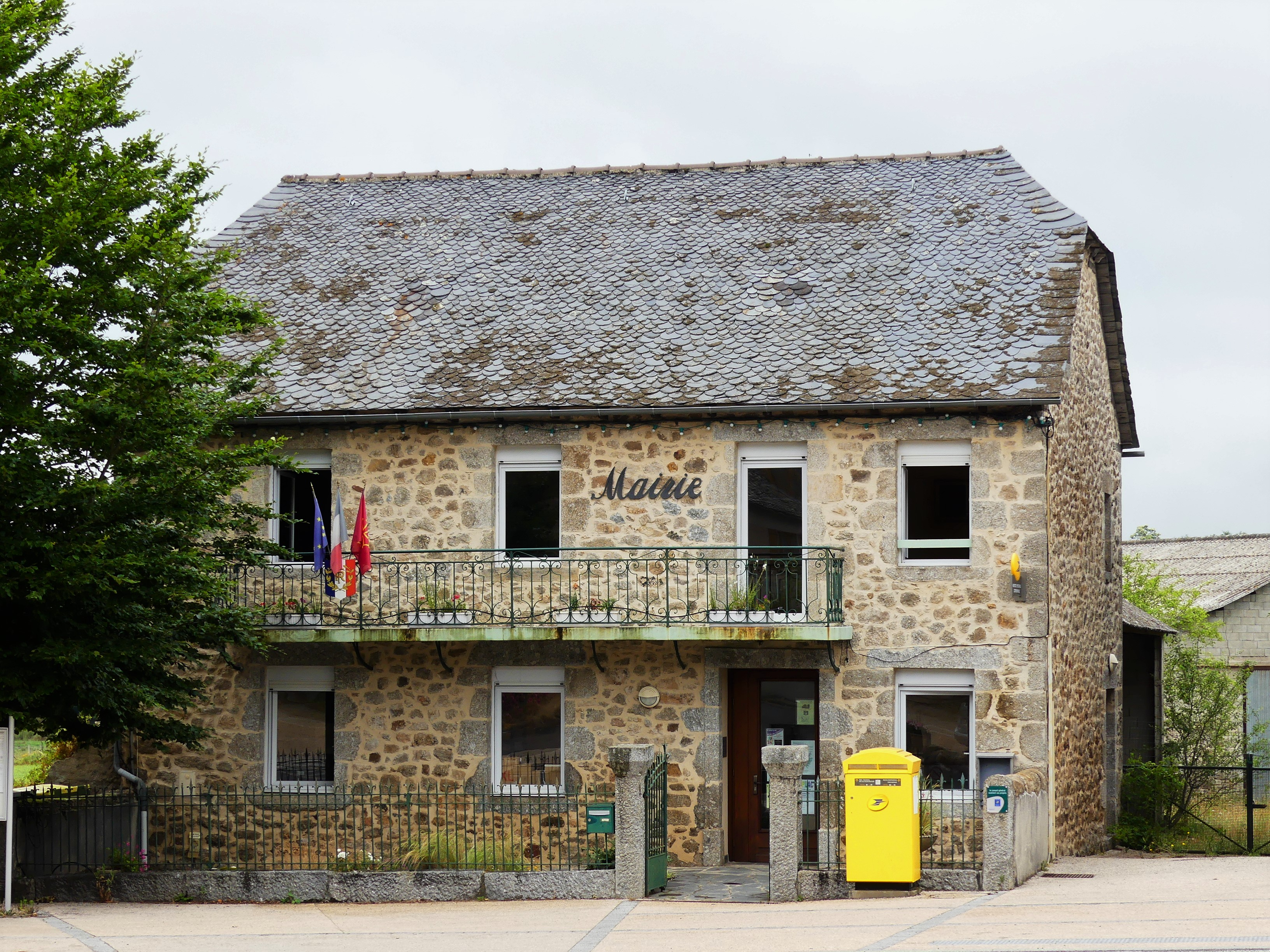
- Town hall
- Location of Campuac
- Location within France Location within Occitanie
- Coordinates: 44°34′11″N 2°35′27″E
- Country: France
- Region: Occitania
- Department: Aveyron
- Arrondissement: Rodez
- Canton: Lot et Truyère

Government
  - Mayor (2020–2026): Thierry Goumon
- Area^{1}: 19.19 km^{2} (7.41 sq mi)
- Elevation: 660 m (2,170 ft)
- Highest elevation: 679 m (2,228 ft)
- Lowest elevation: 394 m (1,293 ft)
- Population (2023): 449
  - Density: 23.4/km^{2} (60.6/sq mi)
- Time zone: UTC+01:00 (CET)
  - Summer (DST): UTC+02:00 (CEST)
- INSEE/Postal code: 12049 /12580
- ^{1} French Land Register data, which excludes lakes, ponds, glaciers > 1 km^{2} (0.386 sq mi or 247 acres) and river estuaries.

Campuac (French pronunciation: [kɑ̃pɥak]; Occitan: Campuac) is a commune in the Aveyron department in southern France.

== Population ==
Historical population
Year	Pop.	±% p.a.
1968	494	—
1975	530	+1.01%
1982	510	−0.55%
1990	496	−0.35%
1999	438	−1.37%
2007	448	+0.28%
2012	446	−0.09%
2017	451	+0.22%
2023	449	−0.07%
Source: INSEE

== See also ==
- Communes of the Aveyron department
