= Zhai Zhonghe =

Chinese biologist (1930–2023)

- 翟中和
- Born: 18 August 1930; Liyang County, Jiangsu, China
- Died: 10 February 2023 (aged 92); Beijing, China
- Education: Tsinghua University; Saint Petersburg State University
- Scientific career
- Fields: Cell biology
- Workplaces: Peking University

Zhai Zhonghe (Chinese: 翟中和; pinyin: Zhái Zhōnghé; 18 August 1930 – 10 February 2023) was a Chinese cell biologist, and academician of the Chinese Academy of Sciences. He was a member of the Chinese Communist Party.

== Biography ==
Zhai was born in Liyang County (now Liyang), Jiangsu, on 18 August 1930. His mother died when he was 8, and he was raised by his paternal grandmother. He secondary studied at Jiangsu Provincial Liyang High School (江苏省立溧阳中学). In 1950, he was admitted to Tsinghua University, where he majored in biology. A year later, he was sent to study at the University of Leningrad (now Saint Petersburg State University) on government scholarships.

Zhai returned to China in 1956 and that same year became a professor at the Department of Biology, Peking University. In 1959, he pursued advanced studies at the Institute of Biophysics of the Soviet Academy of Sciences. He returned to China in 1961 and continued to teach at Peking University. In 1969, during the Cultural Revolution, he was sent to the May Seventh Cadre Schools to do farm work in the suburb of Nanchang, Jiangxi, and returned to Peking University in 1973. He was a visiting scholar at Massachusetts Institute of Technology from 1985 to 1986, studying nuclear skeleton and its relationship with gene expression under the supervision of Sheldon Penman.

Zhai died in Beijing on 10 February 2023, at the age of 92.

== Honours and awards ==
- 1991 Member of the Chinese Academy of Sciences (CAS)
- 1995 Science and Technology Progress Award of the Ho Leung Ho Lee Foundation
