= Coubisou =

Commune in Occitanie, France

- Commune
- Location of Coubisou
- Location within France Location within Occitanie
- Coordinates: 44°33′15″N 2°43′57″E
- Country: France
- Region: Occitania
- Department: Aveyron
- Arrondissement: Rodez
- Canton: Lot et Truyère

Government
  - Mayor (2020–2026): Bernadette Azemar
- Area^{1}: 30.95 km^{2} (11.95 sq mi)
- Elevation: 420 m (1,380 ft)
- Highest elevation: 836 m (2,743 ft)
- Lowest elevation: 319 m (1,047 ft)
- Population (2023): 462
  - Density: 14.9/km^{2} (38.7/sq mi)
- Time zone: UTC+01:00 (CET)
  - Summer (DST): UTC+02:00 (CEST)
- INSEE/Postal code: 12079 /12190
- ^{1} French Land Register data, which excludes lakes, ponds, glaciers > 1 km^{2} (0.386 sq mi or 247 acres) and river estuaries.

Coubisou (French pronunciation: [kubizu]; Occitan: Cobison) is a commune in the Aveyron department in southern France.

== Population ==
Historical population
| Year | Pop. | ±% p.a. |
|---|---|---|
| 1968 | 571 | — |
| 1975 | 508 | −1.66% |
| 1982 | 511 | +0.08% |
| 1990 | 488 | −0.57% |
| 1999 | 502 | +0.31% |
| 2007 | 532 | +0.73% |
| 2012 | 516 | −0.61% |
| 2017 | 492 | −0.95% |
| 2023 | 462 | −1.04% |
Source: INSEE

== See also ==
- Communes of the Aveyron department
