= Espeyrac =

Commune in Occitanie, France

- Commune
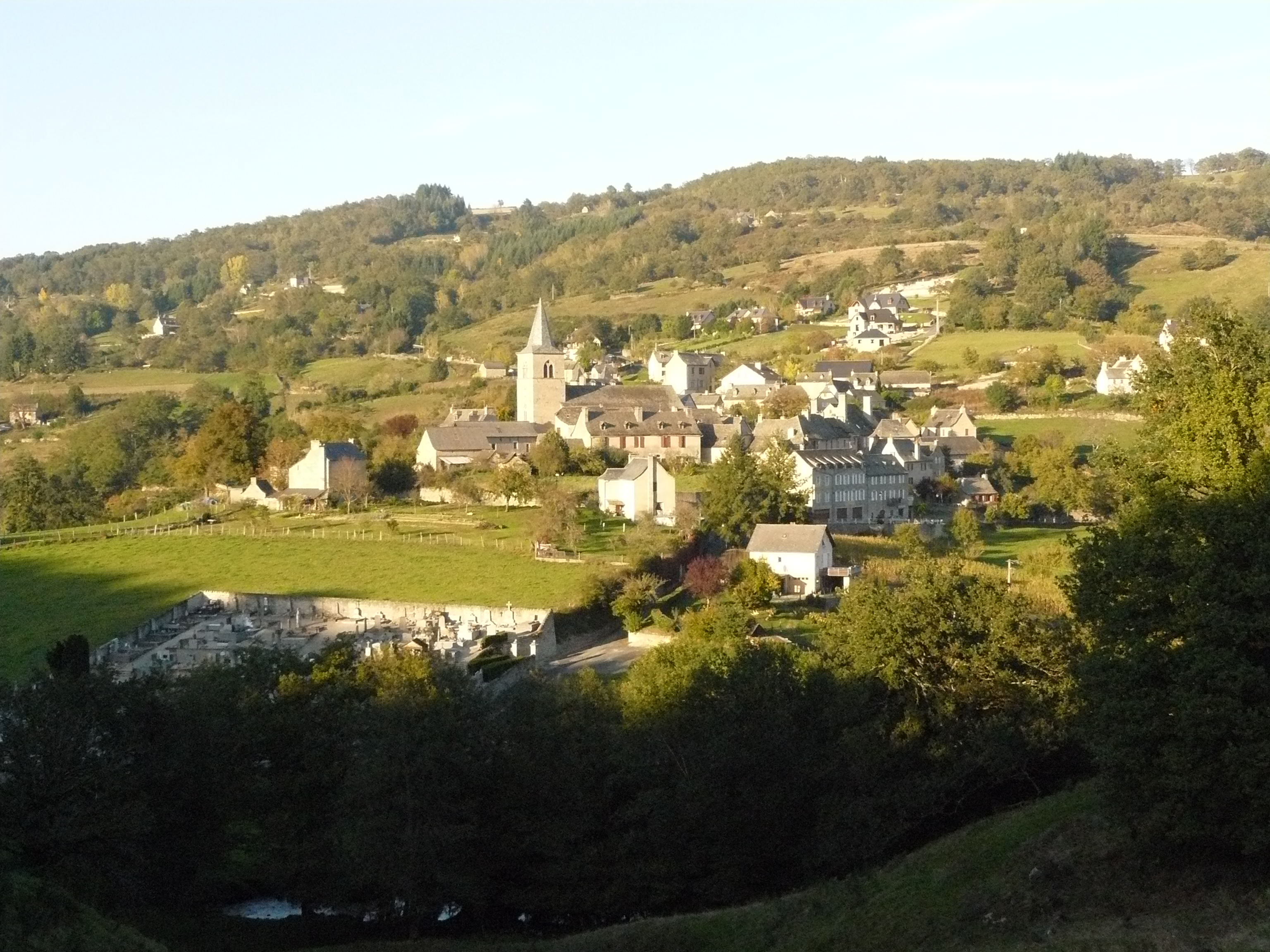
- A general view of Espeyrac

- Coat of arms
- Location of Espeyrac
- Location within France Location within Occitanie
- Coordinates: 44°36′50″N 2°30′40″E
- Country: France
- Region: Occitania
- Department: Aveyron
- Arrondissement: Rodez
- Canton: Lot et Truyère

Government
  - Mayor (2020–2026): Sébastien Costes
- Area^{1}: 22.28 km^{2} (8.60 sq mi)
- Elevation: 340 m (1,120 ft)
- Highest elevation: 674 m (2,211 ft)
- Lowest elevation: 220 m (720 ft)
- Population (2023): 247
  - Density: 11.1/km^{2} (28.7/sq mi)
- Time zone: UTC+01:00 (CET)
  - Summer (DST): UTC+02:00 (CEST)
- INSEE/Postal code: 12097 /12140
- ^{1} French Land Register data, which excludes lakes, ponds, glaciers > 1 km^{2} (0.386 sq mi or 247 acres) and river estuaries.

Espeyrac (French pronunciation: [ɛspeʁak]; Occitan: Espeirac) is a commune in the Aveyron department in southern France.

== Population ==
Historical population
Year	Pop.	±% p.a.
1968	352	—
1975	305	−2.03%
1982	287	−0.87%
1990	225	−3.00%
1999	243	+0.86%
2007	242	−0.05%
2012	240	−0.17%
2017	245	+0.41%
2023	247	+0.14%
Source: INSEE

== See also ==
- Communes of the Aveyron department
