= Le Fel =

Commune in Occitanie, France

- Commune
- Coat of arms
- Location of Le Fel
- Location within France Location within Occitanie
- Coordinates: 44°39′15″N 2°30′22″E
- Country: France
- Region: Occitania
- Department: Aveyron
- Arrondissement: Rodez
- Canton: Lot et Truyère

Government
  - Mayor (2020–2026): Jean-François Albespy
- Area^{1}: 24.89 km^{2} (9.61 sq mi)
- Elevation: 320 m (1,050 ft)
- Highest elevation: 781 m (2,562 ft)
- Lowest elevation: 220 m (720 ft)
- Population (2023): 195
  - Density: 7.83/km^{2} (20.3/sq mi)
- Time zone: UTC+01:00 (CET)
  - Summer (DST): UTC+02:00 (CEST)
- INSEE/Postal code: 12093 /12140
- ^{1} French Land Register data, which excludes lakes, ponds, glaciers > 1 km^{2} (0.386 sq mi or 247 acres) and river estuaries.

Le Fel (French pronunciation: [lə fɛl]; Occitan: Lo Fèl, before 1996: Enguialès) is a commune in the Aveyron department in southern France.

== Population ==
Historical population
Year	Pop.	±% p.a.
1968	315	—
1975	295	−0.93%
1982	219	−4.17%
1990	186	−2.02%
1999	146	−2.65%
2007	172	+2.07%
2012	157	−1.81%
2017	176	+2.31%
2023	195	+1.72%
Source: INSEE

== See also ==
- Communes of the Aveyron department
