= Sébrazac =

Commune in Occitanie, France

- Commune
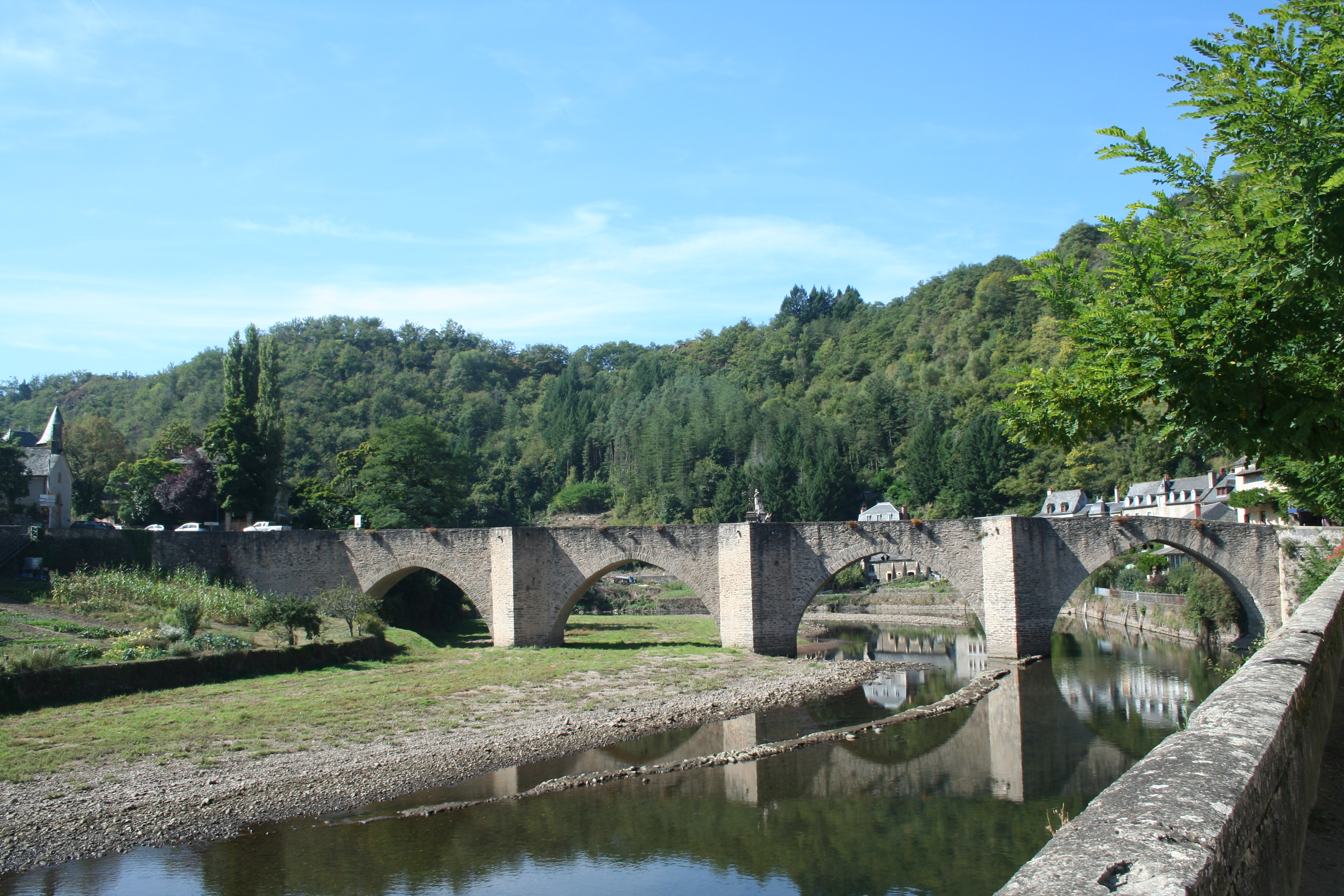
- The bridge between Sébrazac and Estaing

- Coat of arms
- Location of Sébrazac
- Location within France Location within Occitanie
- Coordinates: 44°31′33″N 2°39′29″E
- Country: France
- Region: Occitania
- Department: Aveyron
- Arrondissement: Rodez
- Canton: Lot et Truyère

Government
  - Mayor (2020–2026): Wielfried Doolaeghe
- Area^{1}: 25.04 km^{2} (9.67 sq mi)
- Elevation: 400 m (1,300 ft)
- Highest elevation: 584 m (1,916 ft)
- Lowest elevation: 300 m (980 ft)
- Population (2023): 538
  - Density: 21.5/km^{2} (55.6/sq mi)
- Time zone: UTC+01:00 (CET)
  - Summer (DST): UTC+02:00 (CEST)
- INSEE/Postal code: 12265 /12190
- ^{1} French Land Register data, which excludes lakes, ponds, glaciers > 1 km^{2} (0.386 sq mi or 247 acres) and river estuaries.

Sébrazac (French pronunciation: [sebʁazak]; Occitan: Sebrasac) is a commune in the Aveyron department in the Occitanie region in southern France.

== Population ==
Historical population
Year	Pop.	±% p.a.
1968	521	—
1975	453	−1.98%
1982	466	+0.41%
1990	476	+0.27%
1999	482	+0.14%
2007	517	+0.88%
2012	502	−0.59%
2017	506	+0.16%
2023	538	+1.03%
Source: INSEE

== See also ==
- Communes of the Aveyron department
