= Entraygues-sur-Truyère =

Commune in Occitanie, France

Entraygues-sur-Truyère Entraigas (Occitan)
- Commune
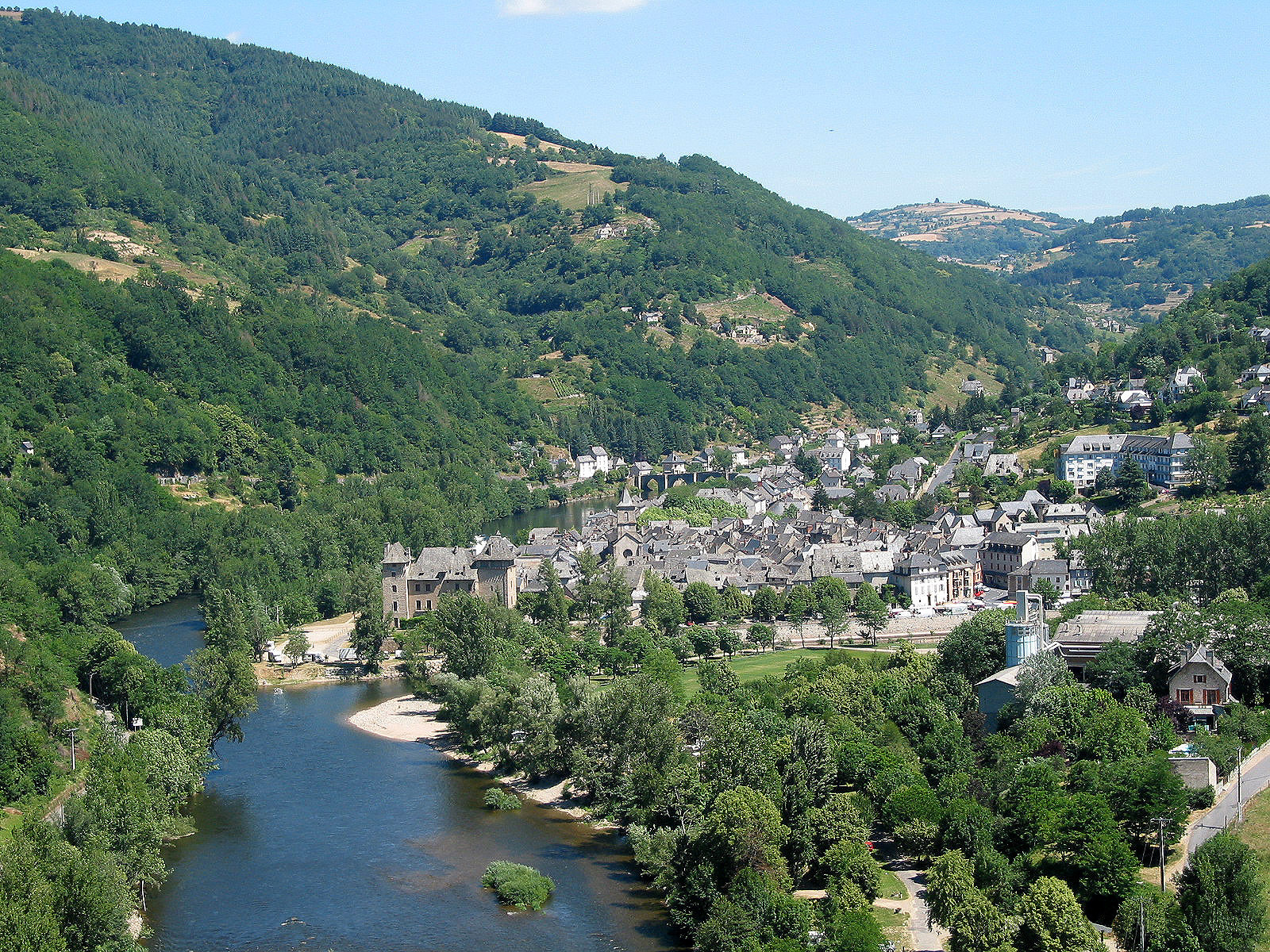
- Entraygues and the Truyère River

- Coat of arms
- Location of Entraygues-sur-Truyère
- Location within France Location within Occitanie
- Coordinates: 44°38′50″N 2°34′03″E
- Country: France
- Region: Occitania
- Department: Aveyron
- Arrondissement: Rodez
- Canton: Lot et Truyère

Government
  - Mayor (2020–2026): Bernard Boursinhac
- Area^{1}: 30.15 km^{2} (11.64 sq mi)
- Elevation: 220 m (720 ft)
- Highest elevation: 744 m (2,441 ft)
- Lowest elevation: 222 m (728 ft)
- Population (2023): 964
  - Density: 32.0/km^{2} (82.8/sq mi)
- Time zone: UTC+01:00 (CET)
  - Summer (DST): UTC+02:00 (CEST)
- INSEE/Postal code: 12094 /12140
- ^{1} French Land Register data, which excludes lakes, ponds, glaciers > 1 km^{2} (0.386 sq mi or 247 acres) and river estuaries.

Entraygues-sur-Truyère (French: [ɑ̃tʁaj syʁ tʁyjɛʁ]; Languedocien: Entraigas) is a commune in the Aveyron department in southern France.

== Geography ==
The village is located 600 km (370 mi) from Paris and 200 km (120 mi) from Toulouse.

== Population ==
Historical population
Year	Pop.	±% p.a.
1968	1,508	—
1975	1,510	+0.02%
1982	1,523	+0.12%
1990	1,495	−0.23%
1999	1,267	−1.82%
2007	1,182	−0.86%
2012	1,059	−2.17%
2017	996	−1.22%
2023	964	−0.54%
Source: INSEE

== Transportation ==
Entraygues-sur-Truyère can be reached by bus from Aurillac (48 km) and from the industrial center of Rodez (55 km). The nearest train station and airport are located in Aurillac or Rodez.

== Personality ==
Urbain Hémard (circa 1548-1592), French physician and dentist.

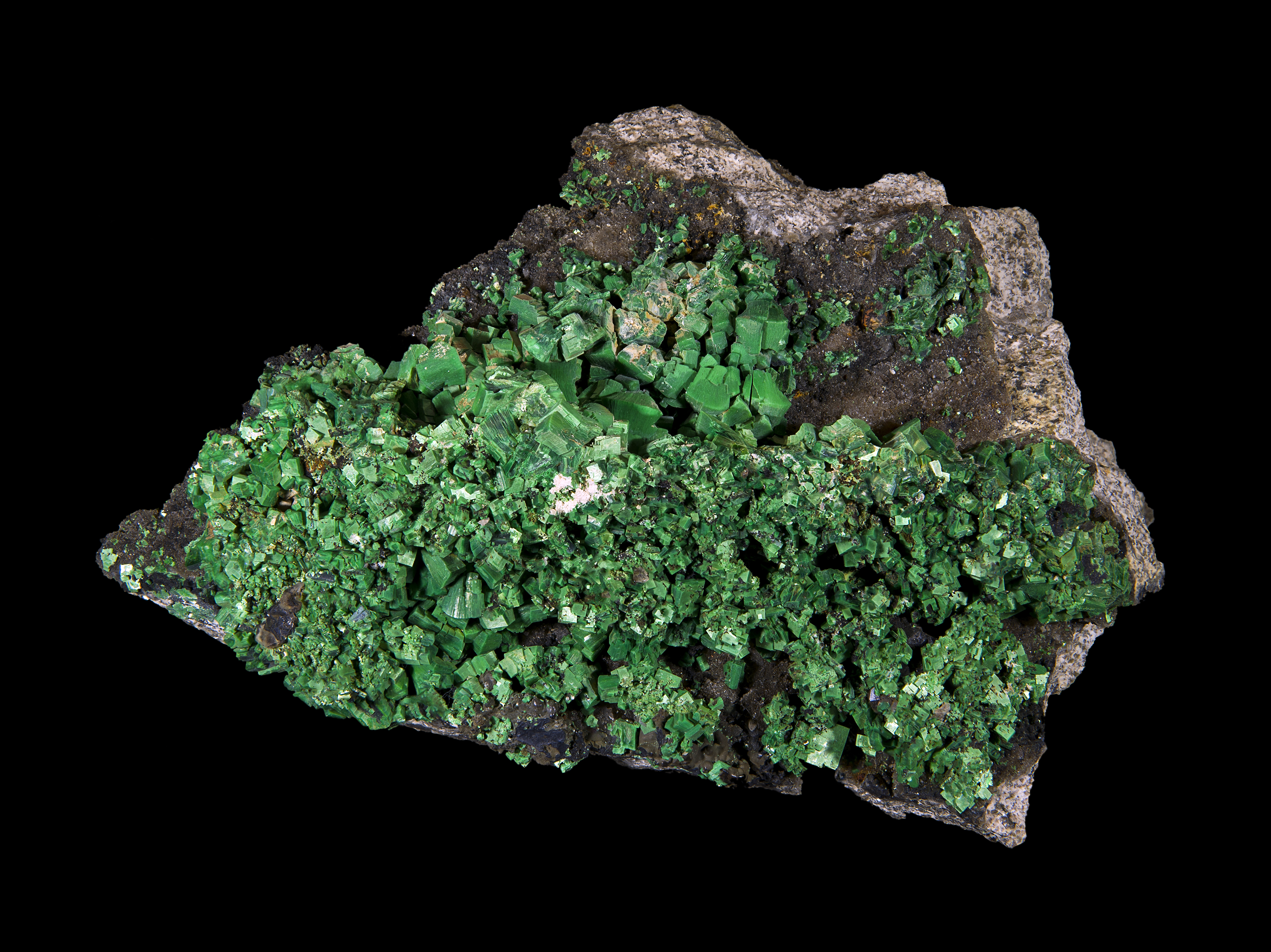
Torbernite from the Margabal Mine, Entraygues-sur-Truyère. Size: 15.3 x 9.6 x 5.6 cm.

== See also ==
- List of medieval bridges in France
