= Le Cayrol =

Commune in Occitanie, France

- Commune
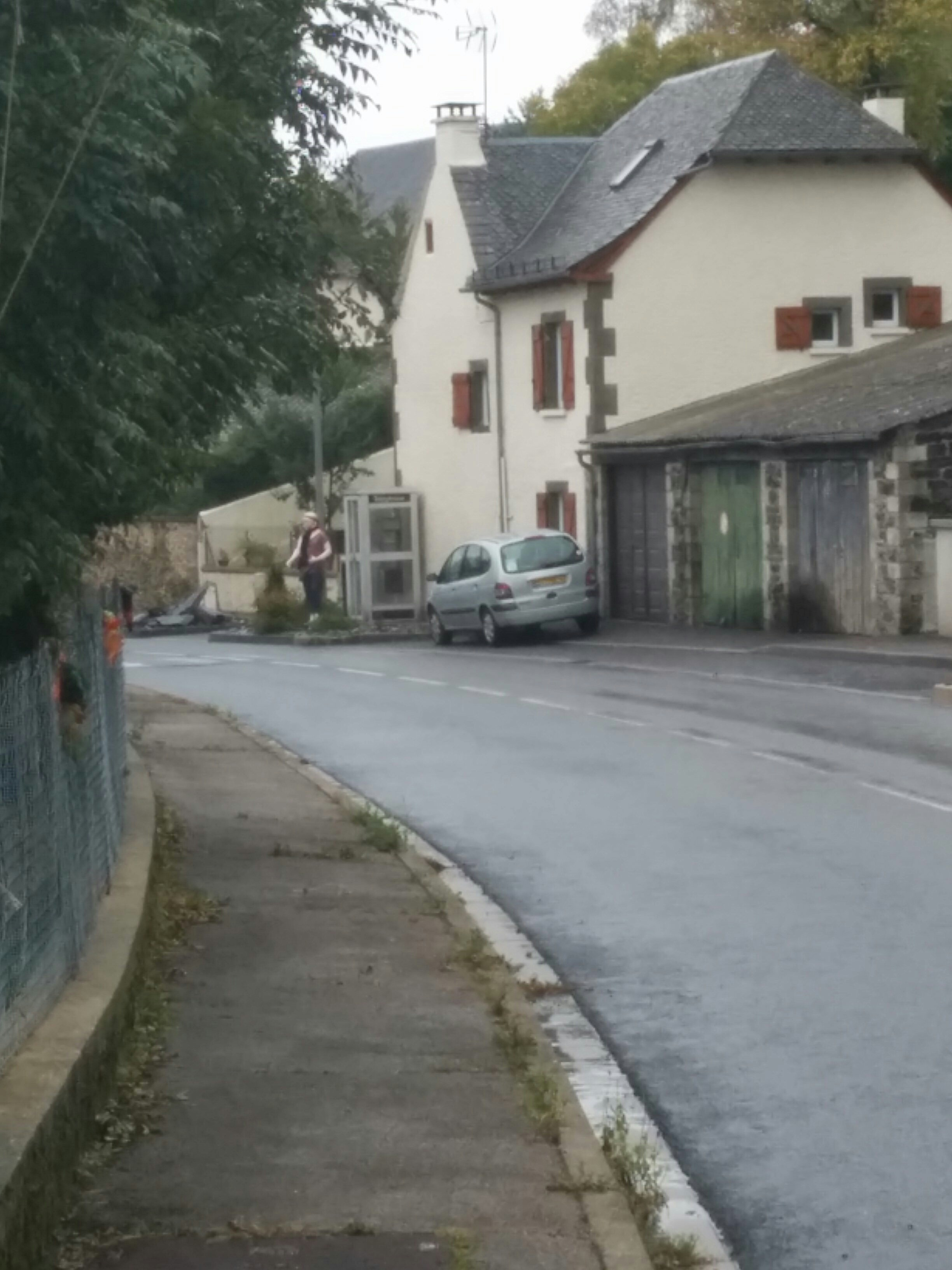
- Street art Scarecrow in October 2015
- Location of Le Cayrol
- Location within France Location within Occitanie
- Coordinates: 44°35′17″N 2°47′34″E
- Country: France
- Region: Occitania
- Department: Aveyron
- Arrondissement: Rodez
- Canton: Lot et Truyère

Government
  - Mayor (2020–2026): Bernard Valery
- Area^{1}: 22.16 km^{2} (8.56 sq mi)
- Elevation: 856 m (2,808 ft)
- Highest elevation: 885 m (2,904 ft)
- Lowest elevation: 470 m (1,540 ft)
- Population (2023): 243
  - Density: 11.0/km^{2} (28.4/sq mi)
- Time zone: UTC+01:00 (CET)
  - Summer (DST): UTC+02:00 (CEST)
- INSEE/Postal code: 12064 /12500
- ^{1} French Land Register data, which excludes lakes, ponds, glaciers > 1 km^{2} (0.386 sq mi or 247 acres) and river estuaries.

Le Cayrol (French pronunciation: [lə kɛʁɔl]; Occitan: Lo Cairòl) is a commune in the Aveyron department in southern France.

== Population ==
Historical population
Year	Pop.	±% p.a.
1968	442	—
1975	416	−0.86%
1982	328	−3.34%
1990	313	−0.58%
1999	282	−1.15%
2007	285	+0.13%
2012	263	−1.59%
2017	259	−0.31%
2023	243	−1.06%
Source: INSEE

== See also ==
- Communes of the Aveyron department
