= Urbain Hémard =

French physician (1548–1592)

- Born: Around 1548; Entraygues, Rouergue, France
- Died: October 14, 1592 (aged 43–44); Estaing, Rouergue, France
- Education: University of Montpellier
- Known for: Recherche de la vraye anathomie des dents, nature et propriété d'icelles
- Scientific career
- Fields: Physician, dentist
- Patrons: Georges d'Armagnac, Archdiocese of Avignon

Urbain Hémard (c. 1548 in Entraygues, Rouergue – 14 October 1592 in Estaing, Rouergue) was a French physician and dentist. He wrote the first French work entirely devoted to dentistry.

== Biography ==
He studied at the University of Montpellier and settled around 1529 in Rodez where he served as lieutenant to the King's First Surgeon for his colleagues in the Sénéchaussée and the Diocese of Rouergue.

He was one of the doctors of Rodez called in 1586 to the bedside of Margaret of Valois, who had taken refuge in the castle of Carlat after her rupture with her family and the King of Navarre, the future Henri IV.

In 1589, he went to Aix-en-Provence, which was afflicted by the plague, and was congratulated by Antoine Davin, the King's physician.

It was in Rodez that Bishop Georges d'Armagnac, ambassador of Francis I in Venice, suffering from dental pains called upon him. Hémard remained for ten years in the service of the Cardinal of Armagnac.

In 1582, Hémard dedicated his book Recherche de la vraye anathomie des dents, nature et propriété d'icelles (Research into the true anatomy of the teeth, their nature and properties) to the Cardinal, preceded a few months ahead by an Essay sur les dents (Essay on Teeth).

Taking advantage of his notoriety, he held the post of Consul twice, in 1581 and 1589, but in 1589, he betrayed the confidence of his fellow citizens by taking the side of the Leagueers against that of the Royalists. Indeed, using his status as consul, he facilitated the entry into the city of soldiers of the League against the advice of his rather royalist fellow citizens. The situation quickly degenerated and the inhabitants of the city were the object of vexations: serious incidents broke out. Banished, he found refuge in Estaing and died there on 14 October 1592, at the age of less than fifty.

== Works ==
The book Recherche de la vraye anathomie des dents, nature et propriété d'icelles consists of twenty-three chapters: the first three are devoted to the names, nature and properties of the teeth, the next three to "feeling", the next seven to the development of the teeth, four of which deal with odontogenesis and three with tooth eruption, and finally the last ten deal with dental diseases, four of which are therapeutic and the last with prophylaxis.

1. The name, genus and substance of the teeth
2. The necessity of teeth and their different properties from other bones
3. Special properties of the teeth
4. Whether the teeth have feelings and to which part they should be attributed
5. How is the substance of the teeth made participant of feeling and whether it can be offended of any quality that touches it
6. If the bones have a feeling
7. Matter from which teeth are produced according to the common opinion of philosophers and doctors
8. That the first teeth that are born and the second estimated to be reborn are formed in the matrix
9. From the consideration of Hippocrates' and Aristotle's reasons on the matter of teeth and the birth of teeth
10. How are the teeth formed and completed
11. How the teeth come out for the first time
12. The second emergence of the teeth
13. Roots and tooth connections
14. Diseases that occur at the first emergence of the teeth
15. Means and remedies to alleviate the pain that occurs when small children's teeth first come out
16. Diseases of second teeth
17. Remedies and means to overcome internal dental diseases from antecedent causes
18. What to do if the pain doesn't go away
19. If we can cure the strong pain of the teeth by notes and charms
20. Trembling, rusting and rotting teeth
21. Tremors that occur in the teeth due to the use of quicksilver
22. From the astonishment or freezing of the teeth that we call esgassure in our country of Entrigues
23. Means and remedies required for the preservation of teeth

== Bibliography ==
- Hémard, Urbain (1582). Recherche de la vraye anathomie des dents, nature et propriété d'icelles (in French) (1 ed.). Lyon: Benoist Rigaud.

== Legacy ==
A residential street bears his name in Rodez. (44°21′45″N 2°32′48″E)
