= Proteasome endopeptidase complex =

Class of enzymes

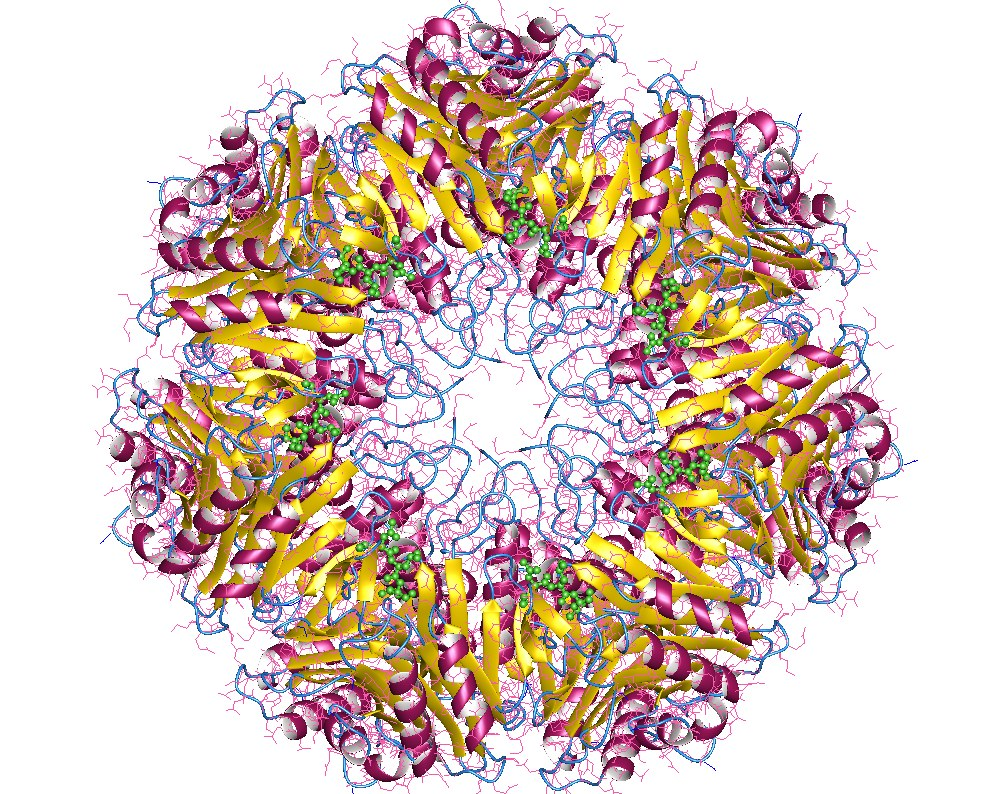
- Proteasome core particle, di-heptamer, Archaea

Identifiers
- EC no.: 3.4.25.1
- CAS no.: 140879-24-9

Databases
- IntEnz: IntEnz view
- BRENDA: BRENDA entry
- ExPASy: NiceZyme view
- KEGG: KEGG entry
- MetaCyc: metabolic pathway
- PRIAM: profile
- PDB structures: RCSB PDB PDBe PDBsum
Search
- PMC: articles
- PubMed: articles
- NCBI: proteins

Proteasome endopeptidase complex (EC 3.4.25.1, ingensin, macropain, multicatalytic endopeptidase complex, prosome, multicatalytic proteinase (complex), MCP, proteasome, large multicatalytic protease, proteasome organelle, alkaline protease, 26S protease, tricorn proteinase, tricorn protease) is an enzyme. This enzyme catalyses the following chemical reaction

Cleavage of peptide bonds with very broad specificity

This 20-S protein is composed of 28 subunits arranged in four rings of seven.
