= Robert Singer (Jewish leader) =

Jewish leader

- רוברט זינגר
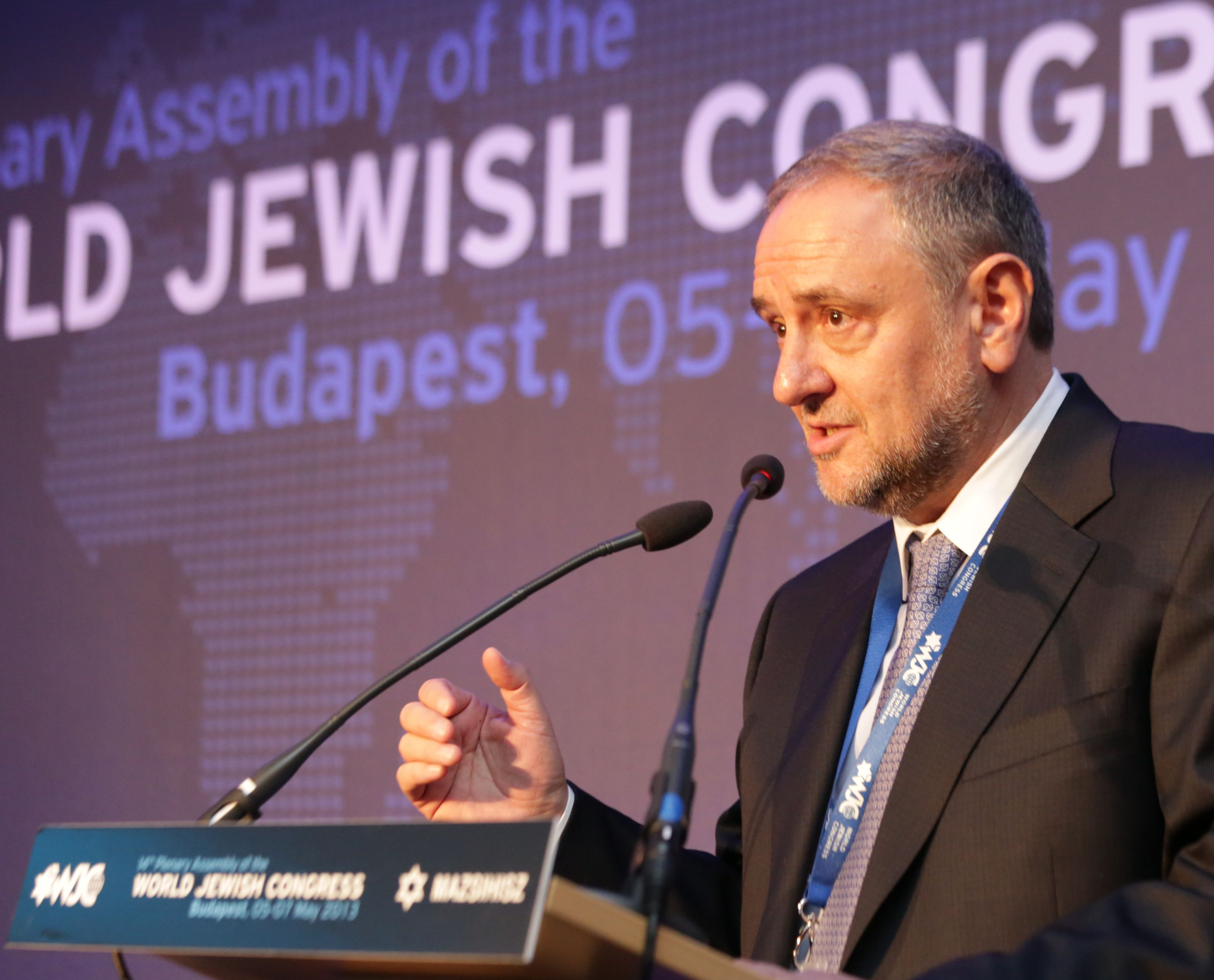
- Singer in 2013
- Born: 1956 (age 69–70); Chernivtsi, Ukraine
- Education: Tel Aviv University (Bachelor of Arts, 1976); University of Bridgeport (Master of Science in Management Engineering, 1996)
- Title: Chief executive officer and executive vice-president

Robert Singer (Hebrew: רוברט זינגר; born in 1956 in Chernivtsi, Ukraine) is a businessman and senior Jewish leader. He serves as chairman of Spero Impact Solution and a volunteer senior executive of several diplomatic, Jewish, and educational nonprofits and initiatives, including Center for Jewish Impact (Chairman), Alumot Or (Chairman), SASA Setton (President and Chairman), the Anières Program (co-founder), Israel Venture Network (Director of the Executive Board), and Combat Antisemitism Movement (Advisory board member).

Singer has an extensive background in education, world Jewish affairs, and diplomacy. Most notably, he was the chief executive officer and executive vice president of the World Jewish Congress from May 2013 until July 2019, and was responsible for historic contributions and strategic decisions made by the international Jewish NGO. He was CEO of World ORT (1999-2013), and later chairman of its board of trustees (2020-2023).

Prior to these roles, Singer was a senior officer in the IDF and the Prime Minister’s Office, where he initiated significant programs in Israel such as Naaleh, Heftziba, Yanosh, and many others, and helped facilitate the aliyah of more than a million Soviet Jews to Israel in the late 1980s through Nativ.

== Professional career ==
=== Business sector ===
==== Spero Impact Solutions ====
In 2019, Robert Singer founded Spero Impact Solutions, an impact investment and consulting firm, and is chairman and CEO.

=== Nonprofit sector ===
==== Center for Jewish Impact ====
In 2020, Robert Singer co-founded the Center for Jewish Impact, an Israeli nonprofit where he is chairman. CJI was established with the vision of becoming a focal point and center for excellence for innovative and impactful initiatives that deliver benefits to Israel and the Jewish world.

Serving as an address for foreign diplomats and dignitaries, international organizations, and Jewish communities who wish to interact directly with Israeli civil society, CJI focuses on impactful activities to facilitate these connections through key initiatives such as the Diplomatic Salon Series, One Team One People, the CJI Fellows program, delegations, and other projects in the fields of education, Israel-diaspora Jewry relations, interfaith dialogue, and combatting antisemitism.

In his role as Chairman of the Center for Jewish Impact, and Member of the Governor's Board of Combat Antisemitism Movement, Robert Singer co-organized the Balkan Forum Against Antisemitism held in partnership with the Albanian Parliament (October 2020) and the Mayors’ Summit Against Antisemitism (November 2022) co-organized with the Mayor of Athens, Greece. Likewise, Robert Singer was one of the main organizers of the Kyiv Forum, which took place on 15–16 December 2021. Additionally, Mr. Singer held several round table events and events with Multinational Envoys and representatives including the EU envoy to the Middle East, UNAOC, and a delegation of senior diplomats from the Permanent Missions to the UN in Geneva.

==== SASA Setton ====
On a voluntary basis as Chairman and President, Singer leads the NGO SASA Setton, an Israeli philanthropic social organization that leads education for hospitalized children in Israel to ensure hospitalization is not a barrier to education and to offer social and emotional support to these children.

==== Alumor Or ====
Singer is chairman of Alumot Or, an Israeli philanthropic social organization that promotes and implements excellence programs in schools for children with Autism, disabilities, and at-risk youth. These programs focus on the student rather than the disability, to develop autonomy, assist with the transition to adulthood, and take a holistic approach that accounts for the child’s environment.

==== Anieres Program ====
Singer co-founded the Anières Program, an excellence scholarship program, aimed to create an elite student community.

=== Former Positions ===
==== World Jewish Congress ====
In 2013, Singer assumed his role as chief executive officer and executive vice president at the World Jewish Congress (WJC). In this role, Singer made a number of structural changes to the organization, notably the creation of a new WJC Program Department, the opening of a WJC representative office in Washington, DC, and the revival of the historic WJC office in Geneva. Likewise, the Jewish Diplomatic Corps, established in 2006 by the organization as an independent body, was reintegrated into the World Jewish Congress structure in 2013 as part of the WJC Program Department.

Singer played a key role in organizing Auschwitz commemorative event marking the 70th anniversary of the liberation of the Nazi concentration camp of Bergen-Belsen in Germany and then moderated a panel at the headquarters of the International Committee of the Red Cross (ICRC) in Geneva on the ICRC’s response to the Holocaust during World War II. He also addressed the 75th anniversary of the Babi Yar massacre alongside Ukrainian President Poroshenko and German President Joachim Gauck in September 2016 and reminded the world that the lessons of Babi Yar had not yet been learned.

On behalf of the WJC, Singer made a number of policy statements He expressed alarm that companies would profit from surging digital sales of Adolf Hitler's book Mein Kampf; Singer told ABC News that "[w]hile the academic study of Mein Kampf is certainly legitimate, the spike in ebook sales likely comes from neo-Nazis and skinheads idolizing the greatest monster in history," and added: "We think that responsible companies shouldn't profiteer from the sales of hate books, or at least should donate the profits to help the victims of anti-Semitism, racism and other like bigotries."

Singer addressed a demonstration outside the United Nations Human Rights Council in Geneva, telling the crowd of more than 1,000 Israel supporters that the Council "needs to overcome its obsession with Israel"; and criticized the lack of progress in bringing the perpetrators of the 1994 AMIA bombing in Buenos Aires to justice.

As a result of his many efforts to empower the Jewish diaspora, in 2018, Singer was awarded the R Republic of Bulgaria’s First Degree Order of the Madara Horsema by President Rumen Radev in recognition of his efforts to strengthen ties between Bulgaria and the Jewish people.

In his capacity as CEO of the World Jewish Congress, Singer has met with government, business, and civil society leaders such as US President Barack Obama, Pope Francis, French President François Hollande, Israeli Prime Minister Benjamin Netanyahu, Russian President Vladimir Putin, Turkish President Recep Tayyip Erdogan, French President Francois Hollande, Danish Justice Minister Mette Frederiksen, Belarusian Prime Minister Mikhail Myasnikovich, Chinese Minister of Overseas Affairs Qiu Yuanping, and Canadian Foreign Minister John Baird.

Robert Singer stepped down as CEO and Executive Vice-President of the World Jewish Congress in July 2019, however remained an advisor to the president of the organization until January 2020.

==== World ORT ====
Singer worked for 14 years (1999-2013) as Director General and CEO of World ORT, the world's largest Jewish education and vocational training network. Between May 2019 to April 2023 Singer was the Chair of the Board of Trustees of World ORT, where he fully recovered the Anières Program and secured its long-term future as well as revamped World ORT’s Governing structure.

==== Israeli government ====
From 1987 to 1999, Singer held positions within the Israeli Prime Minister’s Office, under Prime Ministers Yitzhak Shamir, Yitzhak Rabin, Shimon Peres, and Benjamin Netanyahu.

==== Military ====
Between 1976 and 1987, Singer served in the Israel Defense Forces (IDF), including as senior educational officer, an assignment he said which had allowed him "to gain a tremendous amount of life experience, maturity and perspective."

== Education and personal life ==
Singer moved to Israel from Ukraine with his family at the age of 15. He graduated with a Bachelor of Arts from Tel Aviv University in 1976 and was awarded a Master of Science in Management Engineering from the University of Bridgeport, Connecticut, in 1996. Between 2005 and 2008, he completed various executive management courses at Harvard Business School and Columbia Business School. Mr. Singer is married to Anna, and they have twin daughters.

In an article published in the magazine Jewish Life, he once said that being born into a family of refuseniks in Ukraine created an "unrelenting desire to assist Jews and gentiles with economic and educational development, enabling them to find a way out of the most dire of circumstances." Singer added: "Moving to Israel with my family at the age of 15 was the initial catalyst for me being motivated to invest myself wholeheartedly in helping to develop projects for educational and economic development in Israel and the Jewish community worldwide."

== Opinions ==
Singer is known as a staunch supporter of protecting Israel’s Law of Return from amendments, namely changing the Grandchild Clause, viewing Aliyah and the Law of Return as the bedrock and foundation of Israel. "To change it would be to perhaps irrevocably alter the nature and character of Israel."
