= Albert Goldbeter =

Belgian theoretical biologist and academic (born 1947)

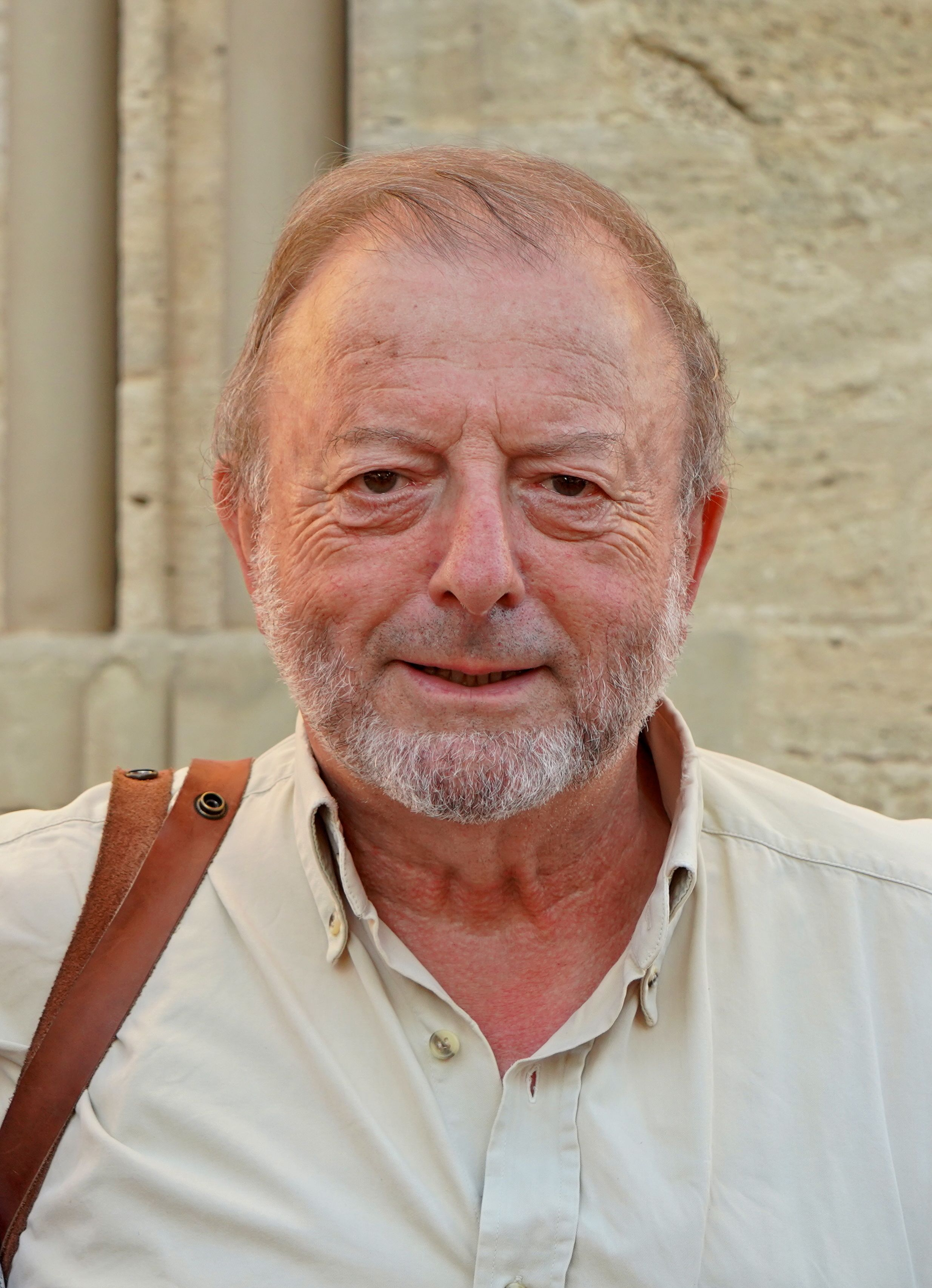
- Born: May 18, 1947 (age 79); Uccle, Belgium
- Scientific career
- Fields: Theoretical biology, Biophysical chemistry
- Workplaces: Université libre de Bruxelles, Weizmann Institute, University of California (Berkeley)
- Doctoral advisor: René Lefever, Grégoire Nicolis
- Other academic advisors: Ilya Prigogine

Albert Goldbeter is a Belgian theoretical biologist who is professor emeritus in the Faculty of Sciences, Université libre de Bruxelles (ULB), Belgium.

== Biography ==
Goldbeter was born May 18, 1947, in Uccle, Belgium. After completing his studies in chemistry, including a doctorate in the group of Prof. Ilya Prigogine at the Université libre de Bruxelles (ULB), Belgium, he was an EMBO postdoctoral fellow at the Weizmann Institute, Rehovot, Israel where he worked with Profs. Roy Caplan and Lee Segel (1973–1975) before returning to the ULB. He then spent another period (1979–1980) working with Prof. Daniel Koshland at the University of California (Berkeley). He was a professor at ULB until his retirement in 2012 and is currently an emeritus Professor at ULB. During his career he has held visiting Professorships at the University of California (Berkeley), Paris VI and Paris XI (Université Paris-Sud, Orsay), and in China at Fudan University in Shanghai, Nanjing Agricultural University, and Soochow University in Suzhou.

== Research ==
Goldbeter's research has focused primarily on modeling a variety of biological oscillations at the cellular level.

He proposed experimentally based molecular models for the circadian clock in Drosophila and mammals, and for the mammalian cell cycle. In collaboration with Daniel Koshland he analyzed the phenomenon of zero-order ultrasensitivity in biochemical systems regulated through phosphorylation-dephosphorylation.

For his work on the mathematical modeling of biological processes, he was awarded the 2010 Quinquennial Prize for Exact Fundamental Sciences from the Belgian National Science Foundation (FNRS). He is a member (2001) and former Director (2009–2010) of the Classe des Sciences (Science Division) of the Académie Royale de Belgique.

== Books ==
- Goldbeter, A (1990). Rythmes et chaos dans les systèmes biochimiques et cellulaires” (Masson, Paris, 1990),. Paris: Masson.
- Goldbeter, A (1996). Biochemical Oscillations and Cellular Rhythms. The Molecular Bases of Periodic and Chaotic Behavior. Cambridge, UK: Cambridge University Press.
- Goldbeter, A. (2018). Au cœur des rythmes du vivant. La Vie oscillatoire. Paris: Odile Jacob.
