= Georges Teissier =

French biologist (1900–1972)

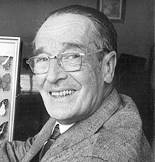
- Born: 19 February 1900; Paris
- Died: 7 January 1972 (aged 71); Roscoff, Finistère, France
- Education: École Normale Supérieure
- Known for: Use of factor analysis and principal components to study natural selection
- Scientific career
- Fields: Mathematical biology
- Workplaces: Centre National de la Recherche Scientifique, Station biologique de Roscoff

Georges Teissier (19 February 1900 – 7 January 1972) was a mathematical biologist who contributed to the modern synthesis with quantitative methods. Along with Philippe L'Heritier he developed methods of studying Drosophila genetics in what are known as population cages. They established a French school of population genetics that was largely unknown internationally. Teissier was born in Paris where his parents were schoolteachers with a Calvinist upbringing. Growing up with an interest in natural history, he studied mathematics at the École Normale Supérieure from 1919. He took an interest in marine biology, studying Cnidaria. He examined anisotropy and polarity in early development. In 1927 he examined the mathematics of animal growth and developed biometric methods. His dissertation in 1931 was on the development of Tenebrio molitor and Galleria mellonella in which he described allometric growth using log-transformed growth curves. He also developed methods of correlational factor analysis and the use of principal components.

He became a part of the French resistance in Sorbonne during World War II. After the war he succeeded Frédéric Joliot-Curie as director of the Centre National de la Recherche Scientifique (CNRS) where he worked with Boris Ephrussi and Philippe L’Héritier to establish a genetics program. He also served as a director of the research centre in Roscoff, Brittany. Together with L’Héritier they began to examine allele proportions in populations of Drosophila maintained in cultures. They held populations in cages and observed the action of starvation on survival. They conducted simultaneous survival experiments on Drosophila strains that differed mainly in mutant loci of interest. Thus their experimental work on examining natural selection and the maintenance of polymorphism was pioneering although isolated within France.
