= Robert H. Singer =

American cell biologist

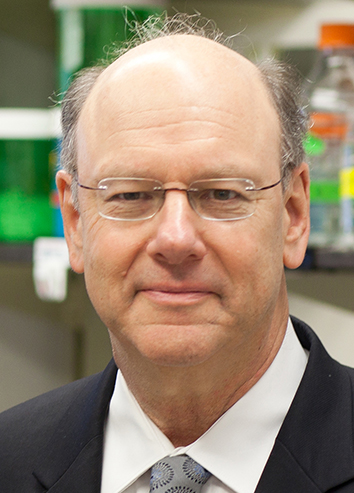
- Born: Boston, Massachusetts
- Education: Oberlin College, Brandeis University
- Awards: Rosenstiel Award (2021): Honorary Doctorate, The Hebrew University of Jerusalem; Honorary Doctor of Science, Oberlin College; Fellow, American Association for the Advancement of Science; Member, National Academy of Sciences; Member, American Academy of Arts & Sciences; Rosenstiel Award
- Scientific career
- Fields: Cell biology, Molecular biology
- Workplaces: Albert Einstein College of Medicine, Janelia Research Campus
- Academic advisors: Sheldon Penman, David Yaffe

Dr. Robert H. Singer received an undergraduate degree in physical chemistry from Oberlin College, and a PhD in developmental biology from Brandeis University. He did postdoctoral work in molecular biology at the Massachusetts Institute of Technology and the Weizmann Institute of Science in Rehovot, Israel. Oberlin College granted Singer an Honorary Doctor of Science in 2016. The Hebrew University of Jerusalem granted Singer an Honorary Doctorate in 2018.

Singer holds the following positions at the Albert Einstein College of Medicine, New York: Professor and Co-Chair, Department of Anatomy and Structural Biology; Professor, Dominick P. Purpura Department of Neuroscience; Professor, Department of Cell Biology; Co-Director, Integrated Imaging Facility; and Co-Director, Gruss Lipper Biophotonics Center. Singer is a senior fellow at the Janelia Research Campus of the Howard Hughes Medical Institute in Virginia.

Singer's career has been focused on the cell biology of RNA, its isolation, detection, expression, and translation. A patent in situ hybridization technique his lab developed for detecting RNA in morphologically preserved cells revealed that messenger RNA can localize in specific cellular compartments. This work has given rise to the field of RNA transport and localization, enhanced by Singer's and his colleagues’ development of imaging technology and RNA reporters. His lab has shown that the dynamics of RNA transcription on a single gene can be interrogated by live cell imaging, as well as by multiplexed fluorescent probes.

Singer's laboratories at Einstein and Janelia have been instrumental in developing rapid and sensitive microscopy that can study single molecules of RNA in living cells and in devising methods to track them through their life cycle. This technology has implications for understanding the role of RNA in such disease processes as cancer metastasis and intellectual disability. He holds 12 patents on his work.

Singer is a member of the US National Academy of Sciences, American Academy of Arts and Sciences, and is a Fellow of the American Association for the Advancement of Science. In 2021, he received the Rosenstiel Award.
