= Institut Jacques Monod =

French research institute

- Founder: Jacques Monod
- Established: 1965
- Focus: Fundamental Research
- Endowment: INSERM, CNRS, University Paris Diderot
- Formerly called: Institut de Biologie Moléculaire
- Address: 15 rue Hélène Brion
- Location: Paris, France
- Coordinates: 48.8282°N 2.3818°E
- Interactive map of Institut Jacques Monod
- Website: www.ijm.fr

The Institut Jacques Monod, funded jointly by the CNRS and the University Paris Diderot, is one of the main centres for basic research in biology in Paris, France. It is headed by Valerie Doye.

There are 3 broad research topics (Genome and chromosome dynamics, Cellular dynamics and signalling, Development and evolution) and 2 main transverse axes (Quantitative biology and modelling, Molecular and cellular pathologies). Research at the interface of biology with physics, mathematics, chemistry and medicine is strongly encouraged.

Some 300 people work at the Institute (tenured investigators, Ph.D. students, post-docs, technicians, engineers, French and foreign visitors, and administrative staff).

== History ==
In the early 60s, Jacques Monod was entrusted with the creation of an institute of molecular biology located on a university campus. The original goal was to create a major research centre that would combine teaching and research.

The “Institut de Biologie Moléculaire” (IBM) thus saw the day in 1966, and Raymond Dedonder was appointed as its first director. The steering committee comprised, in particular, Jacques Monod and François Jacob, who were to receive the Nobel Prize for Medicine in 1965, with their colleague Andre Lwoff from the Institut Pasteur. This committee set the scientific guidelines that were to be developed around the main theme of biochemistry of heredity: the study of replication, protein biosynthesis, the mechanisms and control of transcription and translation in bacteria and in cells of higher organisms, the mechanisms of differentiation, the study of conformation and conformational changes in biological macromolecules, the study of the functional associations of macromolecules and the conformational problems that are posed by these associations.

IBM’s premises (8500 m2) in the Faculty of Sciences of Paris, on the site of the "Halle aux Vins", were formally occupied in December 1969. During the following year, 13 laboratories moved in, and administrative and technical services (including an extensive library, workshop, in-house store etc.) were set up. The institute comprised at that time 143 investigators and teaching staff, and 80 technicians and administrative staff.

In 1978, IBM underwent the first change in its initial organization – the 13 founding laboratories has now become 21 research groups organized into 4 departments. After Raymond Dedonder’s resignation, Francois Chapeville and Giorgio Bernardi were appointed co-directors and, in 1979, the institute was renamed “Institut de Recherche en Biologie Moléculaire” (IRBM).

In 1981, Francis Chapeville remained alone at the head of the institute that he restructured into five departments grouping a total of 27 research teams. In 1982, the institute officially became the “Institut Jacques Monod” (IJM). Then, in 1983, F. Chapeville, in an aim to facilitate cooperation between teams, proposed a different distribution of these teams. There were now just three departments : Structure and molecular and cellular interactions, Molecular genetics of microorganisms and cell differentiation, Development. More new groups joined the Institute during the following decade.

Appointed Director in January 1992, Jacques Ricard again changed the structure of IJM for the sake of thematic consistency. He created 5 departments that were intellectually and financially autonomous (Organization and Expression of the Genome, Supramolecular and Cellular biology, Microbiology, Developmental Biology, and Dynamics and Evolution of the Genome).

By the time Jean-Luc Rossignol took over as director of the Institute in September 1996, around 400 people were working there in 31 labs, including many PhD students and trainees. He decided to maintain the previous structure of five departments, whilst focusing on the consolidation of research topics around “space” (the components and structural and functional organization of cellular space), “time” (dynamics of the cell and of the evolution of genomes), and the “information flow” on which depends the integrated functioning of cells and organisms. Alongside the administrative infrastructure, the various technical facilities were grouped together to form a technological platform with an emphasis on imaging, flow cytometry, and molecular modeling.

Eric Karsenti succeeded to Jean-Luc Rossignol in 2001. In preparation for the future relocation of the Institute at a new site on Paris Left-Bank, he set up in January 2002 a federative research institute (IFR 117 Systems biology). This IFR was composed of the IJM (“from the molecule to the organism”) and a dozen other labs working in the fields of functional and adaptive biology and epigenetics. Under the direction of Eric Karsenti and Jean-Antoine Lepesant, who was in office until late 2008, new teams were recruited in view of this move. Today, the Institut Jacques Monod is directed by Valerie Doye, also a CNRS research director.

== Directors of the Institute ==
- 1966–1978: Raymond Dedonder
- 1978–1981: François Chapeville et Giorgio Bernardi
- 1981–1991: François Chapeville
- 1992–1996: Jacques Ricard
- 1996–2001: Jean-Luc Rossignol
- 2001–2006: Éric Karsenti
- 2006–2008: Jean-Antoine Lepesant
- 2008–2018: Giuseppe Baldacci
- 2018–2023: Michel Werner
- 2023–present: Valerie Doye

== See also ==
- Jussieu Campus
