= Repligen Corporation Award in Chemistry of Biological Processes =

The Repligen Award in Chemistry of Biological Processes was established in 1985 and consists of a silver medal and honorarium. Its purpose is to acknowledge and encourage outstanding contributions to the understanding of the chemistry of biological processes, with particular emphasis on structure, function, and mechanism. The Award is administered by the Division of Biological Chemistry of the American Chemical Society.

The award was suspended in 2018 before being reestablished in 2022 as the Abeles and Jencks Award in Chemistry of Biological Processes. With the help of multiple financial donors, the award was endowed to honor the legacies of Professors Robert H. Abeles and William P. Jencks.

== Recipients ==
Source: ACS - Division of Biological Chemistry

- 1986 – Gregorio Weber
- 1987 – Thomas C. Bruice
- 1988 – Robert H. Abeles
- 1989 – Stephen J. Benkovic
- 1990 – Harold A. Scheraga
- 1991 – William W. Parson
- 1992 – Frank H. Westheimer
- 1993 – Jeremy R. Knowles
- 1994 – Judith P. Klinman
- 1995 – W. Wallace Cleland
- 1996 – William P. Jencks
- 1997 – James A. Spudich
- 1998 – David S. Eisenberg
- 1999 – Christopher T. Walsh
- 2000 – Perry A. Frey
- 2001 – Rowena G. Matthews
- 2002 – C. Dale Poulter
- 2003 – John A. Gerlt
- 2004 – JoAnne Stubbe
- 2005 – David E. Cane
- 2006 – Vern L. Schramm
- 2007 – Michael Marletta
- 2008 – Hung-Wen (Ben) Liu
- 2009 – Frank Raushel
- 2010 – Ronald T. Raines
- 2011 – Richard Armstrong
- 2012 – Carol Fierke
- 2013 – David W. Christianson
- 2014 – John Lipscomb
- 2015 – John S. Blanchard
- 2016 – Tadhg Begley
- 2017 – Wilfred A. van der Donk
- 2018 – Michael H. Gelb
- award suspended - 2018

== See also ==
- List of biochemistry awards
