= Pfizer Award in Enzyme Chemistry =

Biochemistry award

The Pfizer Award in Enzyme Chemistry, formerly known as the Paul-Lewis Award in Enzyme Chemistry was established in 1945. Consisting of a gold medal and honorarium, its purpose is to stimulate fundamental research in enzyme chemistry by scientists not over forty years of age. The award is administered by the Division of Biological Chemistry of the American Chemical Society and sponsored by Pfizer. The award was terminated in 2022.

== Recipients ==
- 1946 – David E. Green
- 1947 – Van R. Potter
- 1948 – Albert L. Lehninger
- 1949 – Henry A. Lardy
- 1950 – Britton Chance
- 1951 – Arthur Kornberg
- 1952 – Bernard L. Horecker
- 1953 – Earl R. Stadtman
- 1954 – Alton Meister
- 1955 – Paul D. Boyer
- 1956 – Merton F. Utter
- 1957 – G. Robert Greenberg
- 1958 – Eugene P. Kennedy
- 1959 – Minor J. Coon
- 1960 – Arthur Pardee
- 1961 – Frank M. Huennekens
- 1962 – Jack L. Strominger
- 1963 – Charles Gilvarg
- 1964 – Marshall Nirenberg
- 1965 – Frederic M. Richards
- 1966 – Samuel B. Weiss
- 1967 – P. Roy Vagelos & Salih J. Wakil
- 1968 – William J. Rutter
- 1969 – Robert T. Schimke
- 1970 – Herbert Weissbach
- 1971 – Jack Preiss
- 1972 – Ekkehard K. F. Bautz
- 1973 – Howard M. Temin
- 1974 – Michael J. Chamberlin
- 1975 – Malcolm L. Gefter
- 1976 – Michael S. Brown & Joseph L. Goldstein
- 1977 – Stephen J. Benkovic
- 1978 – Paul Schimmel
- 1979 – Frederik C. Hartman
- 1980 – Thomas A. Steitz
- 1981 – Daniel V. Santi
- 1982 – Richard R. Burgess
- 1983 – Paul L. Modrich
- 1984 – Robert T.N. Tjian
- 1985 – Thomas R. Cech
- 1986 – JoAnne Stubbe
- 1987 – Gregory Petsko
- 1988 – John W. Kozarich
- 1989 – Kenneth A. Johnson
- 1990 – James A. Wells
- 1991 – Ronald Vale
- 1992 – Carl O. Pabo
- 1993 – Michael H. Gelb
- 1994 – Donald Hilvert
- 1995 – Gerald F. Joyce
- 1996 – P. Andrew Karplus
- 1997 – Daniel Herschlag
- 1998 – Ronald T. Raines
- 1999 – David W. Christianson
- 2000 – Eric T. Kool
- 2001 – Ruma Banerjee
- 2002 – Karin Musier-Forsyth
- 2003 – Dorothee Kern
- 2004 – Wilfred A. van der Donk
- 2005 – Nicole S. Sampson
- 2006 – James Berger
- 2007 – Neil L. Kelleher
- 2008 – Carsten Krebs
- 2009 – Virginia Cornish
- 2010 – Vahe Bandarian
- 2011 – Sarah O’Connor
- 2012 – Jin Zhang
- 2013 – Kate Carroll
- 2014 – Hening Lin
- 2015 – Douglas Mitchell
- 2016 – Michelle C. Chang
- 2017 – Emily Balskus
- 2018 – Mohammad Seyedsayamdost
- 2019 – Kenichi Yokoyama
- 2020 – Rahul Kohli
- 2021 – Amie K. Boal

== See also ==
- List of biochemistry awards
