= Amie Boal =

American chemist

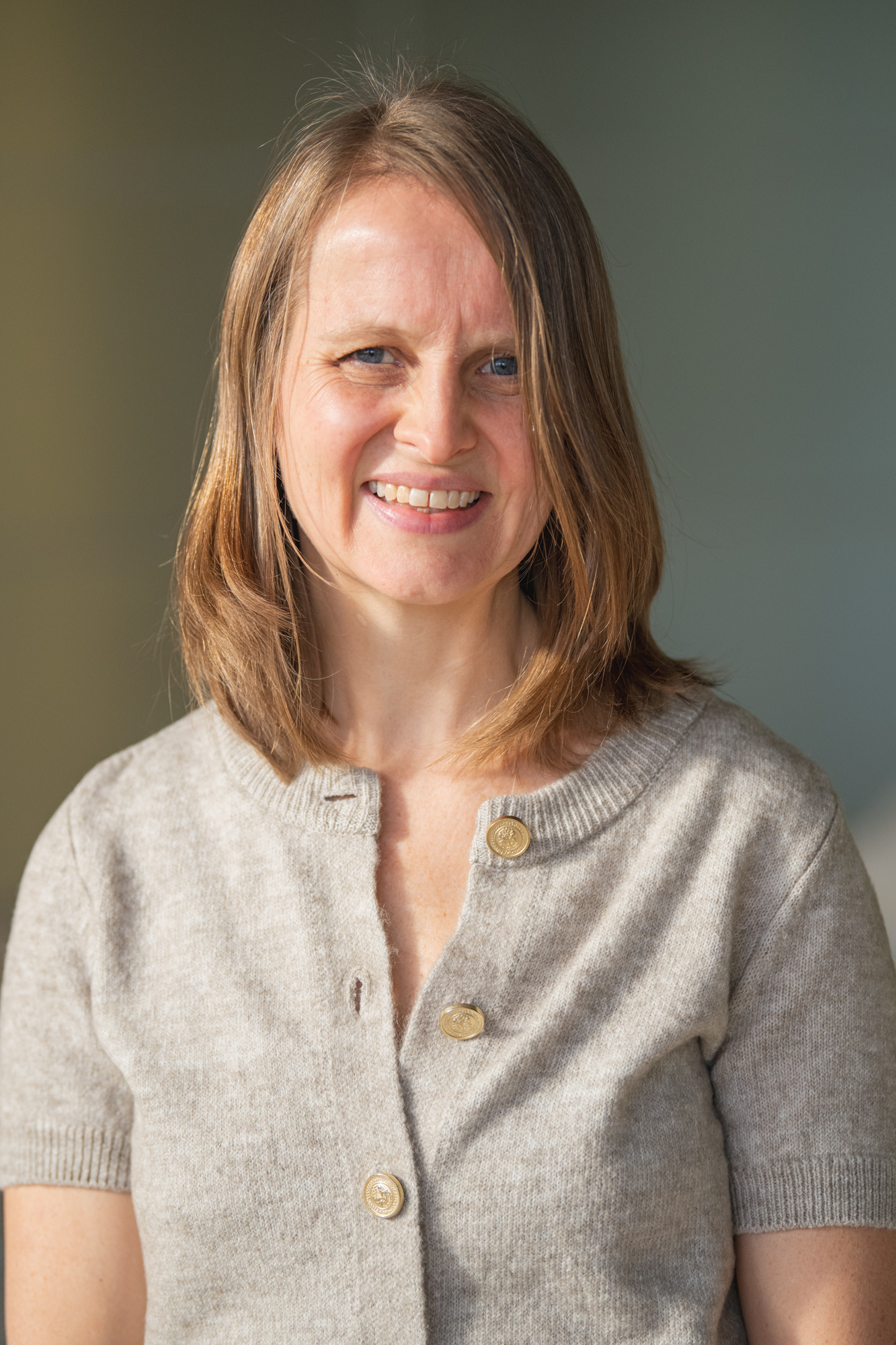
- Born: Amie Kathleen Boal; Portland, Oregon, U.S.
- Awards: Pfizer Award in Enzyme Chemistry; Camille Dreyfus Teacher-Scholar Awards

Academic background
- Education: BA, Chemistry, 2002, Pomona College; PhD, Chemistry, 2008, California Institute of Technology
- Thesis: DNA-Mediated Charge Transport in DNA Repair (2008)
- Doctoral advisor: Jacqueline Barton

Amie Kathleen Boal is an American chemist. She is the Nicholas and Gelsa Pelick Family Chair in Science at Pennsylvania State University. In 2020, Boal was the recipient of the Pfizer Award in Enzyme Chemistry from the American Chemical Society.

== Early life and education ==
Boal is a native of Portland, Oregon. She earned her Bachelor of Arts degree in chemistry from Pomona College and her PhD in the same subject from the California Institute of Technology. Boal wrote her thesis, DNA-Mediated Charge Transport in DNA Repair, which won the Herbert Newby McCoy Award, in 2008 under the guidance of Jacqueline Barton.

Following this, Boal accepted a post-doctoral position in Amy Rosenzweig's laboratory at Northwestern University where she studied interactions between platinum-based anticancer therapeutics and human copper homeostasis proteins. During her post-doctoral fellowship, Boal was awarded a National Institutes of Health (NIH) Pathway to Independence Award and an NIH Ruth L. Kirschstein National Research Service Award.

== Career ==
Boal remained at Northwestern until 2013 when she joined the Departments of Chemistry and of Biochemistry and Molecular Biology at Pennsylvania State University. Her research focused on understanding the structural basis for mechanism and function in diverse families of metalloenzymes. Upon joining the faculty, she was named a Searle Scholar to support her independent research into understanding how microorganisms acquire and use metal ions. Following this, she collaborated with Squire Booker to determine the three-dimensional structure of the RlmN protein from the bacterium. As a result of her collaborative research, Boal was the recipient of a Maximizing Investigators' Research Award for Early Stage Investigators at the NIH.

Prior to her promotion to associate professor, Boal was the senior author of a study that showed that a new subclass of ribonucleotide reductase (RNR) was able to use a modified amino acid instead of a metal ion as the oxidizing agent. In the same year, she was recognized with a Camille Dreyfus Teacher-Scholar Award for being a young chemist who has "created an outstanding independent body of scholarship, and are deeply committed to education."

Boal and her research team later solved an x-ray crystal structure of SznF, showing that the protein contains two different active sites. As a result, she teamed up with Emily Balskus from Harvard University to explore how the bacterium that lives in soil produces streptozotocin. Prior to the start of the 2019–20 academic year, Boal was promoted to the rank of associate professor.

During the COVID-19 pandemic, Boal was the recipient of the Pfizer Award in Enzyme Chemistry from the American Chemical Society. In October 2024, Boal was appointed the Nicholas and Gelsa Pelick Family Chair in Science at PSU.

== Awards ==
- 2020 – Pfizer Award in Enzyme Chemistry
- 2018 – Camille Dreyfus Teacher-Scholar Awards
- 2014 – Searle Scholars Program
- 2012 – NIH Pathway to Independence Award
