= Kenichi Yokoyama =

Japanese biochemist

- Education: Tokyo Institute of Technology, Massachusetts Institute of Technology
- Scientific career
- Fields: Biochemistry, Enzymology, Chemical Biology, Natural Product Chemistry
- Workplaces: Duke University School of Medicine
- Website: https://sites.duke.edu/yokoyamalab/

Kenichi Yokoyama is an enzymologist, chemical biologist, and natural product biochemist originally from Tokyo, Japan. He is an associate professor of biochemistry at Duke University School of Medicine. In 2019, Yokoyama was awarded the Pfizer Award in Enzyme Chemistry from the American Chemical Society.

== Education ==
Kenichi Yokoyama received both his Bachelor of Science in chemistry and PhD in chemistry from the Tokyo Institute of Technology. For his doctoral work, he elucidated the catalytic mechanism of enzymes involved in the biosynthesis of aminoglycoside antibiotics under the guidance of Tadashi Eguchi. From 2008 through 2011, he pursued postdoctoral studies at the Massachusetts Institute of Technology with enzymologist JoAnne Stubbe. Together they collaborated on deciphering the novel features and catalytic mechanism of ribonucleotide reductases, a group of radical-based enzymes that convert ribonucleotides to deoxyribonucleotides, the building blocks of genetic material. In 2011, he began his independent career at Duke University as an Assistant Professor of Biochemistry and Chemistry. In 2019, he was promoted to associate professor with tenure.

== Research ==
The Yokoyama lab's research focuses on natural products, the small organic molecules made by living organisms in nature. Those compounds possess a wide range of activities such as antimicrobial and antitumor. Yokoyama's aims are to characterize the biosynthetic pathways of such molecules and to understand the functions of enzymes that are involved in the process. To that end, his group utilizes techniques and knowledge from various fields including enzymology, biochemistry, molecular biology, bioinformatics, structural biology, and organic chemistry. One of the key achievements of the Yokoyama lab was the identification of a cryptic intermediate in the biosynthesis of molybdenum cofactor, an essential cofactor found in virtually all organisms including bacteria and human. The lab also resolved a multidecade-long mystery in the field by revising the catalytic functions of the first two enzymes in the pathway, MoaA and MoaC. Radical S-adenosylmethionine (SAM) enzyme, a superfamily of enzymes that use iron-sulfur clusters to perform diverse chemical transformations, is another focus of Yokoyama's research program.

In 2018, Yokoyama was named one of 44 prominent scientists worldwide moving Biochemistry into the future. In 2019, he was awarded the Pfizer Award in Enzyme Chemistry from the American Chemical Society, became the third faculty member at Duke University to receive this award after Salih Wakil in 1967 and Paul Modrich in 1983, who later received the Nobel Prize in Chemistry in 2015.
