= Utter (surname) =

Utter is a surname. Notable people with the surname include:

- André Utter (1886–1948), French painter
- Bror Utter (1913–1993), American painter
- Charlie Utter (1838–1912), American prospector
- Dennis Utter (1939–2011), American politician
- Douglas Max Utter (born 1950), American painter
- Fred M. Utter (1931–2023), American fisheries scientist and professor
- George H. Utter (1854–1912), Governor of Rhode Island
- Harriet Utter (1816–1882), one of the first Euro-Canadian settlers on what became the site of Arkona, Ontario
- Lauren Utter (born 1985), artist, model, and contestant on Cycle 10 of America's Next Top Model
- Merton F. Utter (1917–1980), American microbiologist and biochemist
- Robert F. Utter (1930–2014), American jurist
