= Douglas Mitchell (disambiguation) =

Douglas Mitchell (1939–2022) was a Canadian Football League player, executive, and commissioner.

Douglas or Doug Mitchell may also refer to:

- Doug Mitchell (Canadian football) (born 1942), retired Canadian Football League offensive lineman
- Doug Mitchell (film producer) (born 1952), British television and film producer
- Douglas Mitchell (scientist) (born 1980), chemistry professor at the University of Illinois at Urbana-Champaign
- Douglas W. Mitchell (1953–2020), American economist and polymath
- Douglas Edgar Mitchell (1896–1988), South African politician
