= Kevin Burgess =

Kevin Burgess may refer to:

- Kevin Burgess (footballer)
- Kevin Burgess (chemist)
- KB (rapper), American Christian hip hop artist and music executive
