= RNA journal =

RNA journal may refer to:

- RNA (journal), a Cold Spring Harbor Laboratory Press scientific journal
- RNA Biology, a Landes Bioscience scientific journal
