= RNA biology =

RNA biology may refer to:

- For the scientific journal, see RNA Biology.
- For ribonucleic acid, see RNA.
