= Carol Fierke =

American biochemist and academic

Carol Ann Fierke
- Education: Carleton College (BA); Brandeis University (PhD)
- Scientific career
- Fields: Biochemistry
- Workplaces: Pennsylvania State University; University of Michigan; Brandeis University
- Thesis: Utilization of CoA binding energy for catalysis and effect of salts and buffers on a proton transfer reaction (1985)

Carol Ann Fierke is an American biochemist who is the Provost and Executive Vice President for Academic Affairs at Brandeis University. Her research considers biological catalysts and understanding biofunction. She is a fellow of the American Association for the Advancement of Science and of the American Academy of Arts and Letters.

== Early life and education ==
Fierke received a Bachelor of Arts with a major in chemistry from Carleton College. She received a PhD in biochemistry from Brandeis University, where she studied biocatalysts. She then moved to Pennsylvania State University as a postdoctoral researcher.

== Research and career ==
Fierke joined the faculty at Duke University. She moved to the University of Michigan in 1999, and was made Chair of the Department of Chemistry in 2005. She was Head of department for ten years, after which she was made Vice Provost and Dean for Graduate Studies. Fierke joined Texas A&M University in 2017, and moved to Brandeis University as Executive Vice President and Provost in 2020. She has dedicated her career to advocacy for researchers from historically excluded groups.

Fierke's research sought to understand the mechanisms that are used by biological catalysts, enzymes.

== Awards and honors ==
- 1990 David and Lucile Packard Foundation Fellow
- 2006 American Association for the Advancement of Science Fellow
- 2009 University of Michigan Harold R. Johnson Diversity Service Award
- 2011 University of Michigan Rackham Distinguished Graduate Mentor Award
- 2012 American Chemical Society Repligen Corporation Award in Chemistry of Biological Processes
- 2013 University of Michigan Hollenshead Award for Promoting Equity & Social Change
- 2014 Protein Society Emil Thomas Kaiser Award
- 2020 Mildred Cohn Award in Biological Chemistry
- 2021 Fellow of the American Academy of Arts and Letters
- 2021 Diverse Education Top Women

== Selected publications ==
- K A McCall; C Huang (1 May 2000). "Function and mechanism of zinc metalloenzymes". Journal of Nutrition. 130 (5S Suppl): 1437S–46S. doi:10.1093/jn/130.5.1437s. ISSN 0022-3166. PMID 10801957. S2CID 27445012. Wikidata Q30326782.
- Carol A. Fierke; Kenneth A. Johnson; Stephen J. Benkovic (1 June 1987). "Construction and evaluation of the kinetic scheme associated with dihydrofolate reductase from Escherichia coli". Biochemistry. 26 (13): 4085–4092. doi:10.1021/bi00387a052. ISSN 0006-2960. PMID 3307916. S2CID 9460944. Wikidata Q34173585.
- David W. Christianson; Carol A. Fierke (January 1996). "Carbonic Anhydrase: Evolution of the Zinc Binding Site by Nature and by Design". Accounts of Chemical Research. 29 (7): 331–339. doi:10.1021/ar9501232. ISSN 0001-4842. Wikidata Q56672144.
