= Michael Gelb =

Michael Gelb may refer to:

- Michael H. Gelb (born 1957), biochemist and professor at the University of Washington
- Michael J. Gelb (born 1952), writer and trainer, specialising in personal development and corporate training seminars
