= Karin Musier-Forsyth =

American biochemist and researcher

Karin Musier-Forsyth, an American biochemist, is an Ohio Eminent Scholar on the faculty of the Department of Chemistry & Biochemistry at Ohio State University. Musier-Forsyth's research involves biochemical, biophysical and cell-based approaches to understand the interactions of proteins and RNAs involved in protein synthesis and viral replication, especially in HIV.

== Personal history & education ==
Musier-Forsyth was born in 1962 in Dover, NJ to Horst and Maria Musier, who immigrated to the United States from Germany in the 1950s. Her family moved to St. Petersburg, Florida in 1967 and she grew up on the Isle of Capri in Treasure Island, Florida. Her extracurricular activities throughout elementary school, high school, and college included piano, dance, and gymnastics. She attended Eckerd College in St. Petersburg Florida and enjoyed a liberal arts education, study abroad opportunities in London, England and Vienna, Austria, and research experiences at Georgia Institute of Technology, as well as at Eckerd. She graduated in 1984 with a Bachelor of Science degree in chemistry. In 1984, Musier-Forsyth enrolled in graduate school at Cornell University in Ithaca, NY in the Department of Chemistry. Her Ph.D. mentor was Gordon G. Hammes under whom she studied enzyme purification, chemical crosslinking, and biophysical methods such as FRET. She received her Ph.D. in 1989. Musier-Forsyth met her husband, Craig Forsyth, in graduate school and they were married in Ithaca, NY in 1988. They have one son, Nicholas, born in St. Paul, Minnesota in 2003.

== Professional history ==
After receiving her Ph.D. in 1989, Musier-Forsyth began research in the laboratory of Paul Schimmel at MIT as an American Cancer Society Postdoctoral Fellow. In 1992, she was hired as an assistant professor at the University of Minnesota's Chemistry Department. She was subsequently promoted to an associate professor in 1998 and a full Professor in 2003. In 2007, she left the University of Minnesota and took up her current position at the Ohio State University as Ohio Eminent Scholar in Biological Macromolecular Structure and Professor of Chemistry and Biochemistry.

== Awards and honors ==
- 1996-2001 Camille-Dreyfus Teacher Scholar Award
- 2002 Pfizer Award in Enzyme Chemistry
- 2003 Merck Professor of Chemistry, University of Minnesota
- 2004 Distinguished Women Scholars Award, College of Science and Engineering, University of Minnesota
- 2006 Distinguished McKnight University Professor, University of Minnesota
- 2007 Ohio Eminent Scholar
- 2009 American Association for the Advancement of Science (AAAS) Fellow

== Scientific contributions ==
Musier-Forsyth has published over 100 peer-reviewed articles, and is known for her work on elucidating key protein:nucleic interactions involved in viral replication and in the translation of the genetic code. Her work has provided key insights into how the aminoacyl tRNA synthetases, the large family of enzymes involved in protein synthesis, attach the correct amino acids to tRNAs and contribute to the fidelity of protein translation. Her work has also provided fundamental insights into how retroviral replication involves host amino acyl tRNA synthetases and tRNAs. This work highlights potential areas for therapeutic intervention in treating or preventing viral infections.

A world renowned biochemist, Musier-Forsyth is recognized not only for her science expertise but as an educator and mentor. She has lectured at a wide variety of universities around the world and is active in numerous scientific societies. She is a peer reviewer for scientific publications and government granting organizations. Her activities include the following:

- 2003 co-chair of the Nucleic Acids Gordon Conference
- 2004–2006 Director of the Chemical-Biology Interface Pre-doctoral Training Program (Minnesota, 2004–2006)
- 2006–2009 Editorial Advisory Board for Accounts of Chemical Research
- 2006–2009 Editorial Advisory Board, Accounts of Chemical Research
- 2006–2010 NIH Molecular Genetics A study section panel (2006–2010).
- 2010 Guest Editor, Special Issue of RNA Biology on “RNA Chaperones”
- 2011–present co-director of NIH Cellular and Molecular Biochemical Sciences Training Grant at Ohio State University
- 2011–present Editorial Board Member, RNA Biology
- 2012–2016 NIH General Medical Sciences (TWD-B) chartered committee member
- 2012-2017 Editorial Board Member, Journal of Biological Chemistry
- 2014 Guest Editor, Special issue of Virus Research
- 2016-2018 Editorial Board Member, Biophysical Journal
- 2017 NIH Study Section, Ad Hoc Member of AIDS Molecular and Cellular Biology panel
- 2018–present NIH Study Section, Chartered Member of HIV molecular virology, cell biology, and drug development (HVCD) Study Section panel
- 2018–present Director of the Ohio State University Center for RNA Biology
- 2018–present Associate Editor, Journal of Biological Chemistry
