= Kate Carroll =

American chemist (born 1974)

Kate S. Carroll
- Born: 1974 (age 51–52); Morgan Hill, California, U.S.
- Education: Mills College (B.A., 1996); Stanford University (Ph.D., 2003)
- Known for: Sulfur chemical biology; chemical proteomics; protein redox biology
- Awards: Pfizer Award in Enzyme Chemistry (2013)
- Scientific career
- Fields: Chemical biology, redox biology
- Workplaces: Florida Atlantic University, The Scripps Research Institute, University of Michigan
- Doctoral advisor: Suzanne Pfeffer
- Other academic advisors: Dan Herschlag, Carolyn Bertozzi

Kate S. Carroll (born 1974) is an American chemist and professor of chemistry and biochemistry at Florida Atlantic University. She pioneered in-cell chemoproteomic methods to map redox-sensitive cysteines and developed probes that capture distinct oxidation states. These advances transformed redox proteomics into a site-resolved, quantitative discipline and created new strategies for targeting oxidized proteins in disease.

== Early life and career ==
Carroll grew up in Morgan Hill, California, a small agricultural community in southern Santa Clara County. At the time, the town was surrounded by orchards and was only beginning to feel the influence of Silicon Valley.

She studied biochemistry at Mills College in Oakland, earning her B.A. in 1996. She began graduate training at Stanford University with Dan Herschlag, where she worked on enzymatic catalysis and RNA biochemistry, before moving to the laboratory of Suzanne Pfeffer. She completed her Ph.D. in 2003, investigating the molecular mechanisms of receptor trafficking and the regulation of Rab GTPases in the secretory pathway.

From 2003 to 2006 she was a Damon-Runyon postdoctoral fellow at the University of California, Berkeley, working with Nobel laureate Carolyn Bertozzi. In Bertozzi's lab she focused on reductive sulfur metabolism in mycobacteria, an experience that introduced her to the chemical biology of cysteine and redox processes and shaped the trajectory of her later research.

In 2006 Carroll joined the faculty at the University of Michigan as an assistant professor of chemistry and a member of the Life Sciences Institute. Four years later she moved to The Scripps Research Institute in Jupiter, Florida, where she was appointed associate professor and later to full professor. In 2024 she accepted a faculty position as professor of chemistry and biochemistry at Florida Atlantic University, continuing her work on chemical biology and redox proteomics.

== Research ==
Carroll's research examines the chemistry and biology of protein cysteines and how their reversible oxidation regulates cellular function. Her group developed in-cell mapping methods that revealed redox-sensitive cysteines acting as molecular sensors in signaling, metabolism, and stress. She also designed chemoselective probes to detect specific oxidative modifications, enabling proteome-wide analysis and expanding opportunities for redox-based therapeutics. Together, these approaches established site-specific cysteine oxidation as a central principle of redox biology.

Earlier studies of cysteine oxidation were confined to lysates, where modifications were unstable and prone to artifacts. Carroll's group overcame these barriers by capturing oxidation directly in living systems. Using these methods, they showed that oxidation of the epidermal growth factor receptor (EGFR) functions as a reversible switch that enhances kinase activity a finding with implications for cancer drugs that typically target reduced cysteines. Subsequent mapping linked cysteine oxidation to circadian rhythms, ribosome repair after oxidative damage, proteome-wide regulation, and aging. These studies connected site-specific oxidation events to diverse physiological processes.

Her group also developed probes for metastable oxidative states that evade conventional detection. Dimedone-based reagents such as DAz-2 and DYn-2 trapped sulfenic acids in cells, while benzothiazine-based BTD improved kinetics and coverage. Phosphine ligation (WYneN) enabled quantitative readouts and could be directed to mitochondria, and aryl nitroso and diazene electrophiles (DiaAlk) provided tractable chemistry for sulfinic acids (–SO₂H). These tools revealed oxidized cysteines across thousands of proteins, broadening the scope of redox biology and establishing new chemical strategies to interrogate oxidative modifications.

Carroll's laboratory advanced quantitative redox proteomics by introducing the concepts of occupancy, exposure, and flux to distinguish static from dynamic oxidation. Using isotopically labeled WYneN paired with iodoacetamide, her team built dual-probe workflows that measured sulfenylated sites at partial occupancies. These studies showed that low-occupancy events often act as molecular switches, while high-occupancy oxidation reshapes protein function more broadly. They also revealed kinetic hierarchies influenced by local environments and by sulfiredoxin, which repairs sulfinic acids and links redox control to immune signaling and tissue protection.

Her research also highlighted the therapeutic potential of oxidized cysteines. EGFR oxidation was shown to enhance kinase activity, illustrating how oxidation can alter druggable states and affect covalent inhibitors. Her group introduced a nucleophilic covalent ligand strategy that selectively targeted sulfenic acids, uncovering hundreds of previously inaccessible ligandable sites across the proteome. They also devised a redox-triggered approach for mitochondrial targeting and showed that viral proteins, including the SARS-CoV-2 spike, depend on redox-sensitive cysteines for infection. Together, these discoveries established oxidized cysteines as actionable nodes for redox-directed drug discovery.

== Awards and honors ==
Carroll has received recognition for her contributions to chemical biology and redox proteomics. In 2013 she was awarded the American Chemical Society Pfizer Award in Enzyme Chemistry, one of the field's early-career honors presented annually to a scientist under 40 for distinguished contributions to understanding enzyme mechanisms and function. She was cited for developing chemoproteomic methods to probe cysteine oxidation in living cells and for revealing how redox modifications regulate signaling pathways and protein activity. In her award lecture, Carroll emphasized the potential of these approaches to connect fundamental chemistry with biological regulation and to identify new opportunities for therapeutic intervention. She has also delivered invited lectures at national and international meetings, where her work has been noted for bridging enzymology, proteomics, and redox biology. She also was recognized for her commitment to education, receiving the Camille Dreyfus Teacher-Scholar Award in 2010 for her demonstration in leadership and innovation.

== Professional service ==
Carroll is an associate editor of Free Radical Biology & Medicine and previously held the same role at Chemical Research in Toxicology. She has also served as a reviewer for the U.S. National Institutes of Health and National Science Foundation, including as a permanent member of the NIH Synthetic and Biological Chemistry A (SBCA) study section. She has served on the editorial boards of journals including Cell Chemical Biology, Current Opinion in Chemical Biology, Antioxidants & Redox Signaling, Redox Biochemistry and Chemistry, and the Journal of Biological Chemistry. She was elected vice chair (2018) and chair (2020, 2022) of the Gordon Research Conference on Thiol-Based Redox Regulation and Signaling. In addition, she was elected in 2022 to the Program Committee of the ACS Division of Biological Chemistry, contributing to the planning of national symposia.

== Selected publications ==
- Paulsen, C. E.; Truong, T. H.; Garcia, F. J.; Homann, A.; Gupta, V.; Leonard, S. E.; Carroll, K. S. (2012). "Peroxide-dependent sulfenylation of the EGFR catalytic site enhances kinase activity." Nature Chemical Biology. 8 (1): 57–64. doi:[10.1038/nchembio.736](https://doi.org/10.1038/nchembio.736).
- Paulsen, C. E.; Carroll, K. S. (2013). "Cysteine-mediated redox signaling: chemistry, biology, and tools for discovery." Chemical Reviews. 113 (7): 4633–4679. doi:[10.1021/cr300163e](https://doi.org/10.1021/cr300163e).
- Akter, S.; Fu, L.; Jung, Y.; Conte, M. L.; Lawson, J. R.; Lowther, W. T.; Sun, R.; Liu, K.; Yang, J.; Carroll, K. S. (2018). "Chemical proteomics reveals new targets of cysteine sulfinic acid reductase." Nature Chemical Biology. 14 (11): 995–1004. doi:[10.1038/s41589-018-0116-2](https://doi.org/10.1038/s41589-018-0116-2).
- Shi, Y.; Fu, L.; Yang, J.; Carroll, K. S. (2021). "Wittig reagents for chemoselective sulfenic acid ligation enable global site stoichiometry analysis and redox-controlled mitochondrial targeting." Nature Chemistry. 13 (11): 1140–1150. doi:[10.1038/s41557-021-00767-2](https://doi.org/10.1038/s41557-021-00767-2).
- Ferreira, R. B.; Fu, L.; Jung, Y.; Yang, J.; Carroll, K. S. (2022). "Reaction-based fluorogenic probes for detecting protein cysteine oxidation in living cells." Nature Communications. 13: 5522. doi:[10.1038/s41467-022-33079-1](https://doi.org/10.1038/s41467-022-33079-1).
- Fu, L.; Jung, Y.; Tian, C.; Ferreira, R. B.; Chen, R.; He, F.; Yang, J.; Carroll, K. S. (2023). "Nucleophilic covalent ligand discovery for the cysteine redoxome." Nature Chemical Biology. 19 (11): 1309–1319. doi:[10.1038/s41589-023-01330-5](https://doi.org/10.1038/s41589-023-01330-5).
