= Murray Goodman Memorial Prize =

An award recognizing outstanding accomplishments in one or more of the areas of biochemistry, biophysical chemistry, biophysics, or chemical biology. The award is given by the journal Biopolymers, and is named for the journal’s founding editor.

The award consists of a symposium given at the Spring Meeting of the American Chemical Society, a dinner in recognition of the recipient, an invitation to write a review article for Biopolymers and a cash prize.

== Recipients ==
Year	Medalist	Institution
2024	James S. Nowick	University of California, Irvine
2023	Joel P. Schneider	National Cancer Institute, National Institutes of Health
2022	Ronald T. Raines	Massachusetts Institute of Technology
2021	G. Marius Clore	National Institute of Diabetes and Digestive and Kidney Diseases, National Institutes of Health
2019	Eric Kool	Stanford University
2018	David Beratan	Duke University
2017	William DeGrado	University of California, San Francisco
2016	Jennifer Doudna	University of California, Berkeley
2015	Joan A. Steitz	Yale University
2014	Steven G. Boxer	Stanford University
2013	Laura L. Kiessling	University of Wisconsin–Madison
2012	Jeffery W. Kelly	Scripps Research Institute
2011	Dennis A. Dougherty	California Institute of Technology
2010	JoAnne Stubbe	Massachusetts Institute of Technology
2009	Harold Scheraga	Cornell University
2008	Michael Marletta	University of California, Berkeley
2007	Christopher T. Walsh	Harvard Medical School

== See also ==
- List of chemistry awards
