= Perry A. Frey =

American biochemist (born 1935)

- Born: November 14, 1935 (age 89); Plain City, Ohio
- Education: Ohio State University (B.S.), Brandeis University (Ph.D.)
- Known for: Enzyme kinetics and mechanism
- Awards: Alexander von Humboldt Senior Scientist Award, Repligen Corporation Award in Chemistry of Biological Processes
- Scientific career
- Fields: Biochemistry
- Institutions: Harvard University, Ohio State University, University of Wisconsin-Madison
- Doctoral advisor: Robert H. Abeles

Perry A. Frey (born 1935) is professor emeritus of biochemistry at the University of Wisconsin–Madison. He was elected to the National Academy of Sciences in 1998. Research in his laboratory centered on the elucidation of enzymatic reaction mechanisms.

== Early life and education ==
Frey was born in Plain City, Ohio in 1935. He served in the military for two years before attending Ohio State University, where he earned his B.S. degree in chemistry in 1959. Frey earned his Ph.D. in biochemistry from Brandeis University in 1968.

== Career ==
During the time between his undergraduate and graduate studies, Frey worked for the Public Health Service. After earning his Ph.D., he worked as a postdoctoral fellow for enzymologist Frank Westheimer at Harvard University. Frey then secured a faculty position in the chemistry department at the Ohio State University. He held that position for several years, but in 1981 he joined the faculty at the Institute for Enzyme Research (now a part of the biochemistry department) at the University of Wisconsin-Madison.

== Partial bibliography ==
- Frey, Perry A.; Hegeman, Adrian D. (January 28, 2007). Enzymatic Reaction Mechanisms. Oxford University Press. ISBN 978-0-19-512258-9.

== Honors and awards ==
- 1995 - Alexander von Humboldt Senior Scientist Award
- 1998 - Elected to the National Academy of Sciences
- 1998 - American Chemical Society Division of Biological Chemistry's Repligen Corporation Award in Chemistry of Biological Processes
- 2003 - Fellow of the American Academy of Arts and Sciences
- 2003 - Fellow of the American Association for the Advancement of Science
- 2007 - Hilldale Award
