= Michael Chamberlin (biologist) =

American biochemist (1937–2025)

Michael John Chamberlin
- Born: 7 June 1937; Chicago
- Died: 1 November 2025 (aged 88)
- Known for: Gene expression Research
- Awards: Pfizer Award in Enzyme Chemistry (1974); Monie A. Ferst Award (2001)
- Scientific career
- Fields: Biochemistry; Molecular Biology
- Institutions: University of California, Berkeley
- Doctoral students: Tracy L. Johnson

Michael John Chamberlin (7 June 1937 – 1 November 2025) was an American biochemist and molecular biologist. He was a Professor Emeritus of biochemistry and molecular biology at University of California, Berkeley. His research focused on the gene expression in both prokaryotes and eukaryotes. He studied how RNA polymerases initiated and terminated transcription. He became a member of the United States National Academy of Sciences in 1986.

Chamberlin trained leading molecular biologists who now hold positions throughout academia. His former Ph.D. students include Robert Kingston (Harvard), Karen Arndt (U. Pittsburgh), Alice Telesnitsky (U. Michigan), Tom Kerppola (U. Michigan), John Helmann (Cornell), David Arnosti (Michigan State), Leticia Márquez-Magaña (San Francisco State), and Tracy L. Johnson (UC San Diego). In 2001, Chamberlin was recognized for his lifelong contribution to scientific research and training with the Sigma Xi Monie A. Ferst Award.

Chamberlin died 1 November 2025 at age 88.
