= Wilfred van der Donk =

Dutch–American enzymologist and chemical biologist

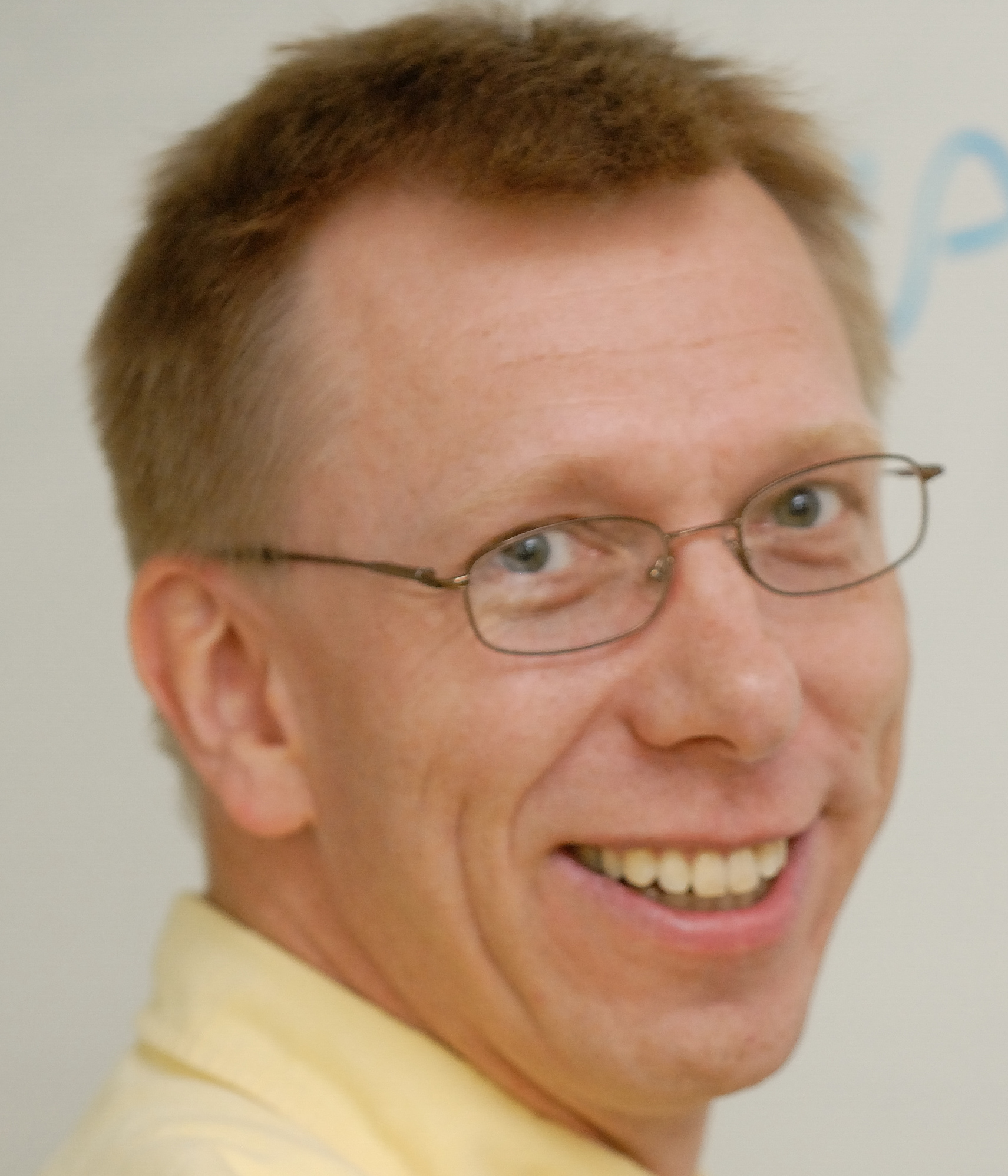
- Born: April 1966 (age 60); Culemborg, Netherlands

Academic background
- Education: B.Sc, 1989, MSc, inorganic chemistry, Leiden University; PhD, 1994, Rice University
- Thesis: Transition Metal Catalyzed Hydroborations (1994)
- Doctoral advisor: Kevin Burgess

Academic work
- Institutions: University of Illinois Urbana-Champaign; Howard Hughes Medical Institute

Wilfred A. van der Donk (born April 1966) is a Dutch–American enzymologist and chemical biologist. He is the Richard E. Heckert Chair in Chemistry at the University of Illinois Urbana-Champaign and a Howard Hughes Medical Institute investigator.

== Early life and education ==
van der Donk was born and raised in Culemborg, Netherlands, where he remained to earn his bachelor's degree and master's degree in inorganic chemistry at Leiden University. Following this, he moved to the United States for his PhD at Rice University with Kevin Burgess. Upon graduating in 1994, he completed his postdoctoral work with JoAnne Stubbe at the Massachusetts Institute of Technology.

== Career ==
Following his postdoctoral position in the laboratory of chemist JoAnne Stubbe, van der Donk joined the faculty at the University of Illinois Urbana-Champaign in 1997. While in this role, he "elucidated the mechanism by which certain enzymes in anaerobic organisms are able to break carbon-chlorine bonds and thus render chlorocarbon molecules less toxic." He also uncovered the chemical pathway responsible for the enzymatic conversion of phosphite to phosphate. As such, he earned a 2001 Sloan Research Fellowship from the Alfred P. Sloan Foundation. From 2005-2008, van der Donk was appointed the William H. and Janet Lycan Professor of Chemistry in the University of Illinois Urbana-Champaign's School of Chemical Sciences, and from 2008-present, he has been the Richard E. Heckert Endowed Chair in Chemistry. He was also chosen to receive the 2004 Pfizer Award from the American Chemical Society (ACS) and named a University Scholar for the 2004–2005 academic year. In these roles, he identified the molecular activity of an enzyme (LctM) responsible for naturally turning a small protein into a lantibiotic. At the start of the following academic year, van der Donk was selected to receive a 2006 Arthur C. Cope Scholar Award from the ACS for his work in answering "longstanding questions about the action of enzyme (COX-2) in the body’s physiological response to injury and infection and elucidating the mechanism by which certain enzymes render chlorocarbon pollutants less toxic." In March 2006, van der Donk's team reported the synthesis of the lantibiotic nisin and later demonstrated that LctM could accept substrates vastly different from its natural substrate, in vitro.

As a professor of chemistry, van der Donk was named a Howard Hughes Medical Institute investigator in 2008 to identify and exploit new classes of compounds that have potential as antibiotics. Two years later, he was elected a Fellow of the Royal Society of Chemistry and American Academy of Microbiology. Van der Donk was also recognized by the American Association for the Advancement of Science "for pioneering contributions to the discovery of natural products and the elaboration of their biosynthesis." In 2012, van der Donk and microbiology professor William W. Metcalf discovered the origin of much of the methane in the oxygen-rich regions of the ocean. He also co-discovered geobacillin that is more stable than nisin, which had the possibility of becoming more effective. As a result of these discoveries, van der Donk was elected a Fellow of the American Academy of Arts and Sciences. In 2017, van der Donk was appointed chairperson of the Searle Scholars Program.

In 2020, van der Donk was named the winner of the Royal Society of Chemistry’s Pedler Award "for the combined application of organic chemistry, molecular biology, and biochemistry to study posttranslationally modified peptides and phosphonate natural products." He also received the Harrison Howe Award from the Rochester American Chemical Society Section. During the COVID-19 pandemic, van der Donk began conducting research on how to prevent the CoV-2 virus from entering human cells. He collaborated with Erik Procko to work on mimicking the part of the ACE2 protein where the spike protein binds as decoys that bind to the virus and prevent it from interacting with the CoV-2 virus. For his CoV-2 virus work, he was awarded the University of Illinois at Urbana-Champaign's College of Liberal Arts and Sciences Impact Award for efforts during the COVID-19 pandemic in 2021. In that same year, he was also elected to the National Academy of Sciences. In 2025, he received the ACS Alfred Bader Award in Bioinorganic or Bioorganic Chemistry as well as the Distinguished Alumni Award of the Wiess School of Natural Sciences from Rice University, his alma mater.
