= David Beratan =

American chemistry and physics professor

David N. Beratan
- Born: 1958 (age 67–68); Evanston, Illinois
- Education: Duke University (B.S.); California Institute of Technology (Ph.D.)
- Known for: Biophysics; Electron tunnelling
- Awards: Irving Langmuir Award (2024); Bourke Award (2019); Murray Goodman Memorial Prize (2018); Feynman Prize in Nanotechnology (2013); Guggenheim Fellow (1999)
- Scientific career
- Fields: Chemistry
- Workplaces: Duke University; University of Pittsburgh
- Thesis: The theory of long distance electron transfer reactions (1985)
- Doctoral advisor: John Hopfield
- Website: chem.duke.edu/labs/beratan

David N. Beratan (born 1958) is an American chemist and physicist, the R.J. Reynolds Professor of Chemistry at Duke University. He has secondary appointments in the departments of Physics and Biochemistry. He is the director of the Center for Synthesizing Quantum Coherence, a NSF Phase I Center for Chemical Innovation.

== Career ==
Beratan received a Bachelor of Science with a major in chemistry from Duke University in North Carolina in 1980. He began his graduate studies in electron transfer theory at California Institute of Technology, where he received a Doctor of Philosophy in 1986, advised by John Hopfield.

Upon completion of his doctorate, Beratan was a National Research Council Resident Research Associate at the Jet Propulsion Laboratory, and later a Member of the Technical Staff, and held a concurrent visiting appointment at Caltech's Beckman Institute. At JPL, he developed the tunneling pathway model for biological electron transfer (with José Onuchic) and general principles for optimizing the nonlinear response of organic structures (with Joseph W Perry and Seth Marder).

In 1992, he was appointed Associate Professor of Chemistry at University of Pittsburgh, where he was promoted to full professor in 1997. At Pittsburgh he pioneered studies of DNA electron transfer, developed the foundations of inverse molecular design theory, and developed strategies to assign the absolute stereochemistries of natural products using theoretical calculations (with Peter Wipf) of optical rotations.

In 2001 he was appointed R.J. Reynolds Professor of Chemistry at Duke University, and he served as chair of the chemistry department from 2004 - 2007. At Duke, his studies have focused on novel electron transfer systems in biology, signatures of quantum coherence in chemistry, host-guest interactions, and inverse molecular design and library design (with Weitao Yang).

== Current research ==
Ongoing studies in the Beratan lab target the design of molecular structures and assemblies to capture and convert solar energy, defining mechanisms of multi-electron redox catalysis, mapping charge transfer pathways and mechanisms in extremophiles, designing molecular structures that focus oscillator strength for light absorption, creating functional de novo proteins, enumerating diversity-oriented property-biased molecular libraries, exploring charge transfer over micrometer to centimeter distances in bacterial nanowires and bacterial cables, understanding how exciting molecular vibrations can change electron transport dynamics, and understanding the physical principles that underpin host-guest interactions.

== Major publications ==
(Publications listed below have been cited more than 200 times)

- A Migliore, NF Polizzi, MJ Therien, and DN Beratan, "Biochemistry and theory of proton-coupled electron transfer", Chem. Rev., 114, 3381-3465 (2014)
- A. Virshup, J. Contreras-García, P. Wipf, W. Yang, and D.N. Beratan, “Stochastic voyages into uncharted chemical space produce a representative library of all possible drug-like compounds,” J. Am. Chem. Soc., 135, 7296-7303 (2013).
- J Contreras-Garcia, ER Johnson, S Keinan, R Chaudret, J-P Piquemal, DN Beratan, and W Yang, "NCIPLOT: A program for plotting noncovalent interaction regions", J. Chem. Theory Comput., 7, 625-632 (2011)
- S.S. Skourtis, D.H. Waldeck, and D.N. Beratan, “Fluctuations in biological and bioinspired electron-transfer reactions,” Annu. Rev. Phys. Chem., 61, 461-485 (2010).
- T.R. Prytkova, I.V. Kurnikov, D.N. Beratan, “Coupling coherence distinguishes structure sensitivity in protein electron transfer,” Science, 315, 622-625 (2007)
- J Lin, IA Balabin, and DN Beratan, "The nature of aqueous tunneling pathways between electron-transfer proteins", Science, 310, 1311-1313 (2005)
- DN Beratan, S Priyadarshy, and SM Risser, "DNA: insulator or wire?", Chemistry & Biology, 4, 3-8 (1997)
- S Priyadarshy, SM Risser, and DN Beratan, "DNA is not a molecular wire: Protein-like electron-transfer predicted for an extended π-electron system", J. Phys. Chem., 100, 17678-17682 (1996),
- JM Nocek, JS Zhou, S De Forest, S Priyadarshy, DN Beratan, JN Onuchic, and BM Hoffman, "Theory and practice of electron transfer within protein-protein complexes: Application to the multidomain binding of cytochrom c by cytocrome c peroxidase", Chem. Rev., 96, 2459-2490 (1996)
- S Priyadarshy, MJ Therien, and DN Beratan, "Acetylenyl-linked, porphyrin-bridged, donor-acceptor molecules: A theoretical analysis of the molecular first hyperpolarizability in highly conjugated push-pull chromophore structures", J. Am. Chem. Soc., 118, 1504-1510 (1996)
- DN Beratan, JN Onuchic, JR Winkler, and HB Gray, "Electron-tunneling pathways in proteins", Science, 258, 1740 (1992)
- JN Onuchic, DN Beratan, JR Winkler, and HB Gray, "Pathway analysis of protein electron-transfer reactions", 'Annu. Rev. Biophys. Struct., 21, 349-377 (1992)
- DN Beratan, JN Betts, and JN Onuchic, "Protein electron transfer rates set by the bridging secondary and tertiary structure", Science, 252, 1285-1288 (1991)
- SR Marder, DN Beratan, and L-T Cheng, "Approaches for Optimizing the First Electronic Hyperpolarizability of Conjugated Organic Molecules", Science, 252, 103-106 (1991)
- DN Beratan, JN Onuchic, JN Betts, BE Bowler, and HB Gray, "Electron tunneling pathways in ruthenated proteins", J. Am. Chem. Soc., 112, 7915-7921 (1990)
- JN Onuchic and DN Beratan, "A predictive theoretical model for electron tunneling pathways in proteins", J. Chem. Phys., 92, 722 (1990)
- DN Beratan, JN Onuchic and JJ Hopfield "Electron tunneling through covalent and noncovalent pathways in proteins", J. Chem. Phys., 86, 4488 (1987)
- JN Onuchic, DN Beratan, and JJ Hopfield, "Some aspects of electron-transfer reaction dynamics", J. Phys. Chem., 90, 3707-3721 (1986)
- DN Beratan and JJ Hopfield, "Calculation of tunneling matrix elements in rigid systems: mixed-valence dithiaspirocyclobutane molecules", J. Am. Chem. Soc., 106, 1584-1594 (1984)

== Awards and honors ==
- Member, National Academy of Sciences, 2024
- Irving Langmuir Award in Chemical Physics, American Chemical Society, 2024
- Faraday Horizon Prize, Royal Society of Chemistry, 2023
- Edward W. Morley Medal, American Chemical Society, Cleveland Section, 2021
- Cozzarelli Prize, Proceedings of the National Academy of Sciences of the United States of America, 2020
- Bourke Award of the Royal Society of Chemistry, 2019
- Murray Goodman Memorial Prize, 2018
- Florida Award, American Chemical Society, Florida Section, 2017
- Charles H. Herty Medal, American Chemical Society, Georgia Section, 2015
- Feynman Prize in Nanotechnology (Theory), Foresight Institute, 2013
- Elected Fellow, Royal Society of Chemistry (2013), American Chemical Society (2013), American Association for the Advancement of Science (2002), and the American Physical Society (2001)
- J.S. Guggenheim Foundation Fellow, 1999-2000
- Ralph & Lucy Hirschmann Visiting Professorship, University of Pennsylvania, 2000
- NSF National Young Investigator, 1992-97
