= Alton Meister =

American biochemist (1922–1995)

- Born: June 1, 1922
- Died: April 6, 1995 (aged 72); Mediplex rehabilitation center, Stamford, Connecticut, US
- Education: Harvard University; Cornell University Medical College
- Known for: glutathione research; AIDS research
- Awards: National Institutes of Health Merit Award 1987; Pfizer Award in Enzyme Chemistry 1954
- Scientific career
- Fields: Biochemistry
- Workplaces: Cornell University Medical College; National Institutes of Health; National Cancer Institute; Tufts University School of Medicine; New York Hospital

Alton Meister (1922–1995) was an American biochemist who made pioneering contributions to the study of glutathione metabolism.

Alton Meister was born in New York City to Morris Meister and Florence Glickstein Meister. He received an undergraduate degree from Harvard University and an MD from Cornell University Medical College (now Weill Cornell Medical College). He then moved to the National Cancer Institute at the National Institutes of Health in Bethesda, Maryland. He remained there until 1955 when he became Chairman of the Department of Biochemistry at Tufts University. Meister returned to Cornell University Medical College in 1967 and served as chairman of its biochemistry department until 1991. He died in 1995 at the age of 72.
