= Douglas Mitchell (scientist) =

Douglas A. Mitchell
- Born: February 22, 1980 (age 46)
- Education: Carnegie Mellon University; University of California, Berkeley; University of California, San Diego
- Scientific career
- Fields: Chemical Biology
- Workplaces: University of Illinois at Urbana–Champaign
- Doctoral advisor: Michael Marletta

Douglas A. Mitchell is a professor of chemistry at the University of Illinois at Urbana-Champaign. He holds an affiliate appointment in the Department of Microbiology and is a faculty member of the Carl R. Woese Institute for Genomic Biology. His research focuses on the chemical biology of natural products. He is known mainly for his work on the biosynthetic enzymology of ribosomally synthesized and post-translationally modified peptides (RiPPs) and genome-guided natural product discovery.

== Early life and education ==
Mitchell was born in western Pennsylvania and obtained his B.S. in chemistry from Carnegie Mellon University in 2002. He obtained his PhD in 2006 from the University of California, Berkeley and worked with Michael Marletta on the nitric oxide-dependent post-translational modifications of proteins. For postdoctoral studies, he worked with Jack Dixon at the University of California, San Diego and pursued the study of Streptococcal toxin biosynthesis. In 2009, he began his independent career at the University of Illinois at Urbana–Champaign as an assistant professor of chemistry. In 2015, he was promoted to associate professor with tenure.

== Research interests ==
- Natural products
- Genome-mining
- Antibiotic resistance
- Mechanistic enzymology

== Notable awards ==
- NIH Director’s New Innovator Award
- Pfizer Award in Enzyme Chemistry
- Packard Fellowship for Science and Engineering
- Camille Dreyfus Teacher-Scholar Award
- National Fresenius Award
