= Vern L. Schramm =

American biochemist (born 1941)

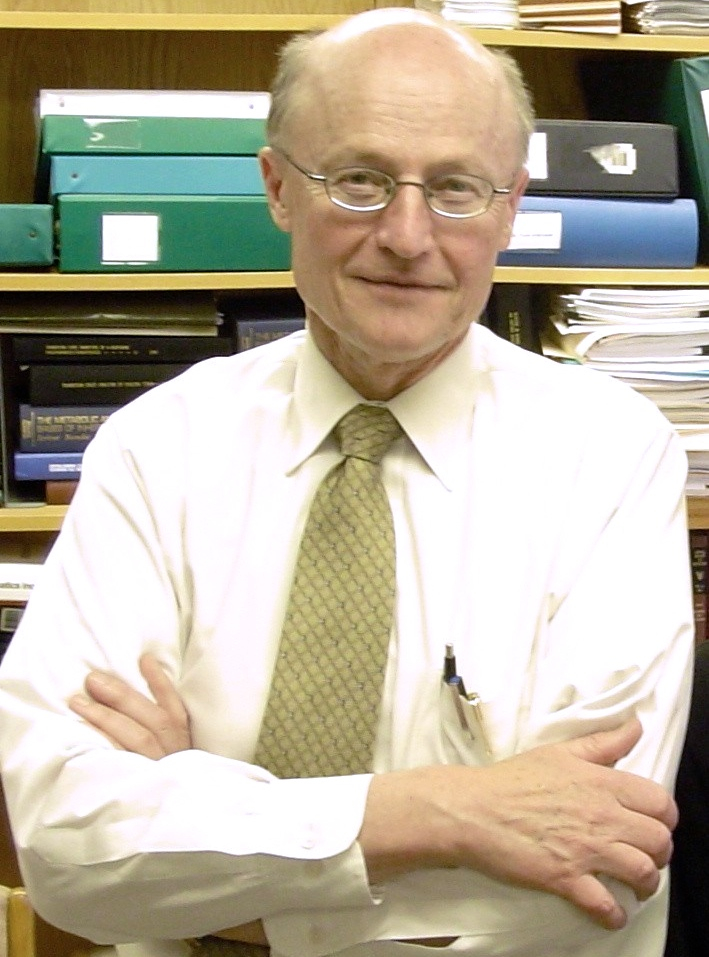
- Schramm in 2004
- Born: November 9, 1941 (age 84); Howard, South Dakota, U.S.
- Education: South Dakota State University
- Known for: Enzyme kinetics, Kinetic isotope effect
- Awards: Rudi Lemberg Award, Repligen Award
- Scientific career
- Fields: Biochemistry
- Workplaces: Albert Einstein College of Medicine
- Doctoral advisor: John F. Morrison

Vern L. Schramm (born November 9, 1941) is a professor and Ruth Merns Chair in Biochemistry at the Albert Einstein College of Medicine of Yeshiva University. Schramm was elected to the National Academy of Sciences in 2007. His laboratory's research focuses on the elucidation of enzymatic mechanisms and transition state structure.

This information is then used for the logical design of transition-state inhibitors which have the potential to be new biologically active agents. Some of these are in development to be drugs. Schramm's work has translated basic chemical understanding at the quantum mechanical level to a new approach to drug development.

== Education ==
Schramm earned his bachelor's degree from South Dakota State College, now South Dakota State University. He earned his master's degree in nutrition from Harvard University and his Ph.D. in the mechanism of enzyme action from the Australian National University.

== Career ==
Schramm secured a postdoctoral position at the NASA Ames Research Center after graduation. Later he joined the Temple University School of Medicine as a faculty member. In 1987 he joined the faculty at Albert Einstein College of Medicine as professor and chair of the biochemistry department.

== Personal life ==
Schramm and his wife Deanna made a commitment to gift the first endowed position at the South Dakota State University College of Natural Sciences.

Schramm was diagnosed with colon cancer in 2022.

== Awards and distinctions ==
- 1999 - Rudi Lemberg Award from the Australian Academy of Science
- 2006 - Repligen Corporation Award in Chemistry of Biological Processes from the Biological Chemistry Division of the American Chemical Society
- Harry Eagle Award for Outstanding Basic Science Teaching from Albert Einstein College of Medicine
- George A. Sowell Award for Excellence in Teaching from Temple University School of Medicine
