= W. Wallace Cleland =

William Wallace Cleland
- Born: January 6, 1930; Baltimore, Maryland
- Died: March 6, 2013 (aged 83)
- Education: Oberlin College (A.B., 1950); University of Wisconsin (M.S., 1953) (Ph.D., 1955)
- Known for: Enzyme kinetics and mechanism
- Awards: Repligen Award
- Scientific career
- Fields: Biochemistry
- Workplaces: University of Wisconsin

William Wallace Cleland (January 6, 1930 – March 6, 2013, often cited as W. W. Cleland, and known almost universally as "Mo Cleland", was a University of Wisconsin-Madison biochemistry professor. His research was concerned with enzyme reaction mechanism and enzyme kinetics, especially multiple-substrate enzymes. He was elected to the National Academy of Sciences in 1985.

== Life and education ==
Cleland was born in 1930 in Baltimore, Maryland. He received his A.B. from Oberlin College in 1950 and his M.S. and Ph.D. from the University of Wisconsin–Madison in 1953 and 1955, respectively. He was an avid stamp collector and was awarded the Lifetime Achievement Award in Philately by the Smithsonian Institution in 2008. Cleland died on March 6, 2013, after falling on ice.

== Career ==
After carrying out postdoctoral research at the University of Chicago he returned to University of Wisconsin–Madison, where he became assistant professor in 1959. In 1962 he was promoted to associate professor and then professor in 1966. He became J. Johnson Professor of Biochemistry in 1978, and Steenbock Professor of Chemical Science in 1982.

Kresge, Simoni and Hill have presented a general appreciation of Cleland's life and career.

== Scientific contributions ==
=== Papers ===
Cleland's research focused on the use of enzyme kinetics to deduce enzyme mechanisms, especially those involved in phospho and acyl transfers. He pioneered the kinetic and mechanistic study of enzymes with more than one substrate, and he was probably the first to make a systematic classification of mechanisms and the corresponding kinetic equations. Building on this work he made kinetic studies of various enzymes, including isotope exchange of creatine kinase.

Cleland was a pioneer in the use of computers to analyze enzyme kinetic data, and his Fortran programs that implement Wilkinson's analysis, which he distributed to anyone who requested them, were very influential.

In the latter part of his career Cleland contributed greatly to studies of the use of kinetic isotope effects as a tool for elucidating mechanisms of enzyme catalysis.

He was the first to use dithiothreitol for the reduction of disulfide bonds in proteins, and the compound is accordingly often called Cleland's reagent.

=== Book ===
Enzyme Kinetics and Mechanism (with P. F. Cook, 2007)

== Awards and recognition ==
- 1985 - Elected to the National Academy of Sciences
- 1986 - Fulbright Senior Scholar Award
- 1990 - Merck Award (American Society for Biochemistry and Molecular Biology)
- 1993 - Alfred Bader Award in Bioinorganic or Bioorganic Chemistry (American Chemical Society)
- 1995 - Repligen Corporation Award in Chemistry of Biological Processes(Biological Chemistry Division of the American Chemical Society)
- 1999 - Stein and Moore Award (Protein Society)
- 2008 - Lifetime Achievement Award in Philately, Smithsonian Institution
- 2014 - 36th Steenbock Symposium - In honor of the life of W. W. Cleland
