= David W. Christianson =

American biochemist

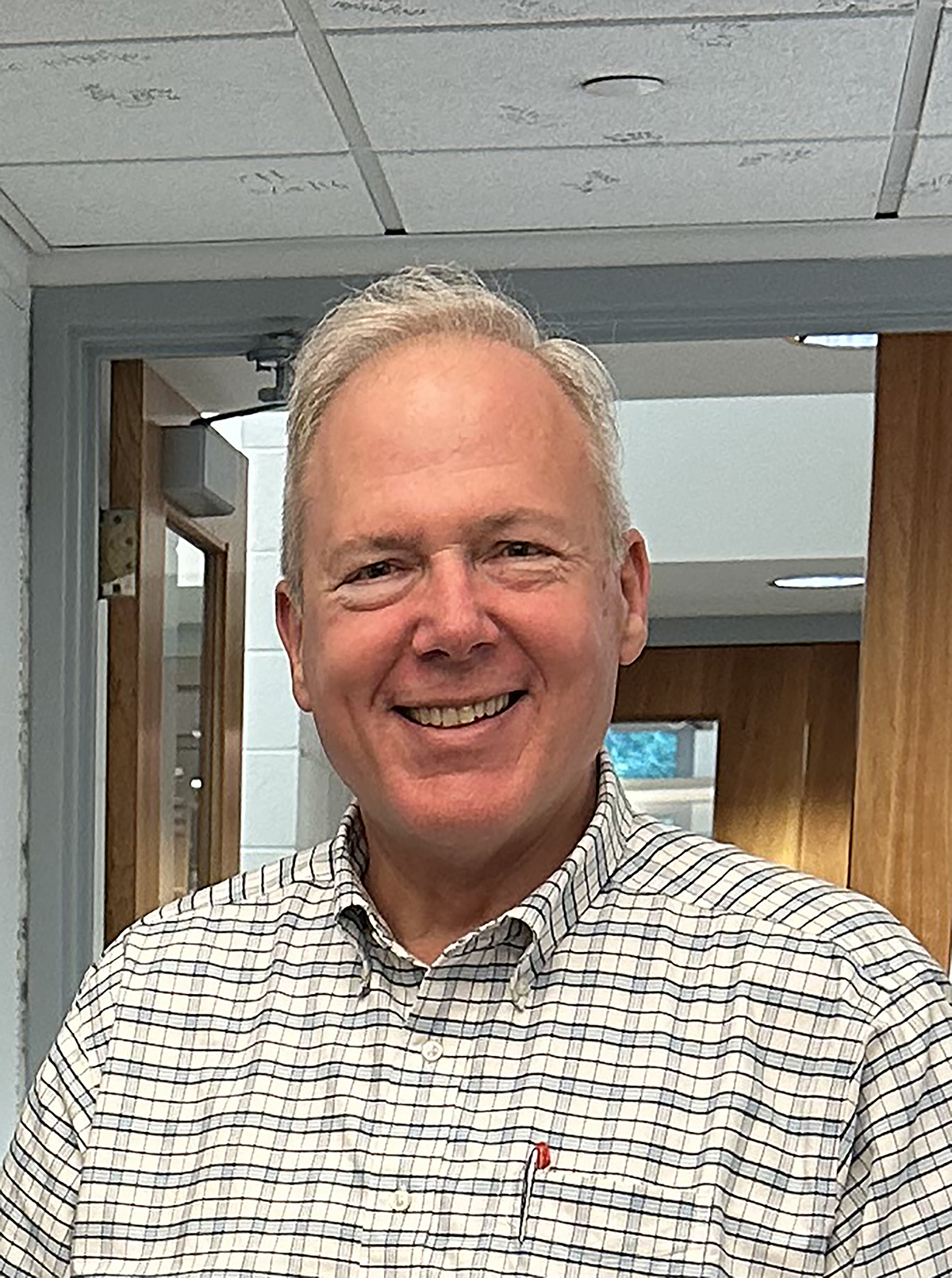
- Born: June 9, 1961 (age 65); Attleboro, Massachusetts
- Education: Harvard College, A.B. (1983); Harvard University, A.M. (1985); Harvard University, Ph.D. (1987); University of Pennsylvania, M.A. (honoris causa, 1993)
- Known for: Structural and mechanistic studies of enzymes
- Awards: Pfizer Award in Enzyme Chemistry (1999); Guggenheim Fellowship (2006); Repligen Corporation Award in Chemistry of Biological Processes (2013); Fellow of the Harvard Radcliffe Institute (2015-2016); Inspirational Educator Award, Oxford University (2019) American Chemical Society Philadelphia Section Award (2021); Fellow of the Japan Society for the Promotion of Science (2025)
- Scientific career
- Institutions: University of Pennsylvania; Cambridge University; Harvard University

David W. Christianson is an American biochemist and structural biologist. He has served on the faculty of the Department of Chemistry of the University of Pennsylvania since 1988, where he is currently the Roy and Diana Vagelos Professor in Chemistry and Chemical Biology. He has also held Visiting Professor appointments at Harvard University and the University of Cambridge. His research focuses on enzyme structure, mechanism, and inhibition, and he has published more than 300 peer-reviewed scientific papers. Along with Professor Karen Allen at Boston University, he is Co-Editor-in-Chief of the well-known serial Methods in Enzymology.

== Early life ==
Christianson was born in Attleboro, Massachusetts, and grew up in the neighboring town of North Attleboro. His parents, Ronald and Florence ("Goldie") Christianson, were graduates of the New England Conservatory of Music and taught in the North Attleboro public schools. Christianson developed his interest in chemistry as an elementary school student and his teachers encouraged this interest through his high school years. Christianson's high school research project involved the quantitation of methane output from decomposing sewage acquired from the town sewage treatment plant; Christianson received state-wide recognition for this work during the 1979 oil crisis ("N. Attleboro Senior is Energy Saver", by Phyllis Coons. The Boston Globe, 10 April 1979, p. 32). Christianson graduated from North Attleboro High School in 1979. A musician by avocation, Christianson served as Organist and Choirmaster at the First Baptist Church of North Attleboro (1978-1980), and then at the First Congregational Church of Melrose, Massachusetts (1980-1988).

== Education and Research ==
Christianson earned his bachelor's degree from Harvard College in 1983, and remained at Harvard University to complete his master's and doctoral studies in 1985 and 1987, respectively. He was a doctoral student in the research group of William N. Lipscomb. Christianson’s doctoral studies established the structural basis for the catalytic mechanism of the zinc protease carboxypeptidase A.

Christianson joined the University of Pennsylvania faculty in 1988, and is currently the Roy and Diana Vagelos Professor in Chemistry and Chemical Biology. Christianson's research focuses on enzyme structure, mechanism, and inhibition. Highlights of Christianson’s research accomplishments include some of the first crystal structures of site-specific variants of an enzyme, human carbonic anhydrase II, including variants with engineered zinc binding sites with applications as metal ion biosensors. In 1996, he reported the first crystal structure of an enzyme in the arginase-deacetylase superfamily, arginase I, later discovering that this manganese metalloenzyme regulates the nitric oxide-dependent processes underlying sexual arousal. Subsequent work in this enzyme superfamily included crystal structure determinations of histone deacetylases 6, 8, and 10 complexed with inhibitors (including HDAC-targeted drugs), as well as the surprising discovery that HDAC10 is a highly specific polyamine deacetylase. Christianson has also led the field of terpene synthase structural biology with the first crystal structure determination of a bacterial sesquiterpene cyclase in 1997, followed by landmark structures of hemiterpene, monoterpene, and diterpene synthases from bacteria, fungi, and plants. Later, Christianson was the first to report structures of bifunctional “assembly-line” terpene synthases, along with the discovery that some of these bifunctional enzymes engage in substrate channeling between active sites.

Christianson's research accomplishments have been recognized by the Pfizer Award in Enzyme Chemistry (1999) and the Repligen Corporation Award in Chemistry of Biological Processes (2013) from the Biological Chemistry Division of the American Chemical Society, and the American Chemical Society Philadelphia Section Award (2021). Christianson was also awarded a Guggenheim Fellowship in 2006. Earlier in his career at Penn, Christianson received the Young Investigator Award from the Office of Naval Research (1989), a Searle Scholar Award (1989), an Alfred P. Sloan Research Fellowship (1992), and a Camille Dreyfus Teacher-Scholar Award (1993). Christianson is a member of the American Chemical Society and a Fellow of the Royal Society of Chemistry.

In 2009, Christianson was presented with the Joseph W. Martin, Jr. Distinguished Alumni Award from the North Attleboro High School Alumni Association, an honor that was also recognized by a citation from the Massachusetts Senate.

Christianson has also been recognized by numerous lectureships in the US and abroad, including the John Wriston Lecture at the University of Delaware (2015), the Pennsylvania Drug Discovery Institute Award Lecture (2018), the Luojia Lecture at Wuhan University (2018), the Chemistry & Biochemistry Distinguished Lecture at the University of California, Los Angeles (2023), the Drug Research Academy Lecture at the University of Copenhagen (2024), and the Warwick Structural Biology Lecture at the University of Warwick (2025).

To date, Christianson has published more than 300 papers (H-index = 99) and has deposited 578 protein structures in the Protein Data Bank (PDB). Protein structures determined in his research group have been featured five times as the "PDB Molecule of the Month".

== Entrepreneurial Activities ==
Christianson co-founded the biopharmaceutical company Arginetix, then Corridor Pharmaceuticals, acquired by AstraZeneca in 2014. Christianson has also served as a consultant to various pharmaceutical and biotechnology companies, including Alcon, GSK plc, Achaogen, Accent Therapeutics, and Manus Bio.

== Teaching Accomplishments ==
Christianson has been recognized for his teaching accomplishments with the Christian R. and Mary F. Lindback Award for Distinguished Teaching (2017) and the Ira H. Abrams Memorial Award for Distinguished Teaching (2025) from the University of Pennsylvania, and the Inspirational Educator Award from the Rhodes Trust, Oxford University (2019).

== Academic Leadership ==
Christianson was Chair of the Department of Chemistry at Penn 2018–2023, leading the department through the unprecedented challenges of the pandemic. His approach to academic leadership and research culture was highlighted in Chemistry World, the official newsmagazine of the Royal Society of Chemistry.

== Human Rights Activism ==
Christianson has explored ethical issues in biomedical research and has criticized the use of intellectually disabled children as clinical test subjects. Christianson has also protested the connection between the American Chemical Society and the federal death penalty, arguing that the Constitution of the Society "is a moral compass, pointing toward a world in which our society and our chemistry must focus on how to improve human life, not how to end it."

== Visiting Appointments ==
Christianson was the Underwood Fellow in the Department of Biochemistry and a Visiting Fellow at Sidney Sussex College, Cambridge University (Michaelmas Term, 2006), the Elizabeth S. and Richard M. Cashin Fellow at the Harvard Radcliffe Institute (2015-2016), and Visiting Professor in the Department of Chemistry and Chemical Biology at Harvard University in 2016. He was also a Fellow of the Japan Society for the Promotion of Science, hosted by the University of Tokyo (2025).
