= Eric Kool =

American chemist

Eric T. Kool (born 1960) is an American chemist, focusing in chemistry of RNA and DNA; probe design and imaging; synthetic biology, currently the George A. and Hilda M. Daubert Professor in Chemistry at Stanford University and is an Elected Fellow at the American Association for the Advancement of Science.

Kool was born in Libertyville, Illinois, and carried out undergraduate studies at Miami University. He received the Beckman Young Investigators Award in 1992. He is the 2019 recipient of the Murray Goodman Memorial Prize.
