= Douglas Max Utter =

American painter

- Born: Douglas Max Utter; December 8, 1950 (age 75); Cleveland, Ohio, U.S.
- Education: Case Western Reserve University
- Known for: Expressionist painting, Art criticism
- Movement: Expressionism
- Children: Christopher Utter, Elizabeth Hyler
- Parent: Merton F. Utter (father)
- Awards: Cleveland Museum of Art May Show Grand Prize (1987); Ohio Arts Council Fellowships (1993, 1995, 2001)

Douglas Max Utter (born December 8, 1950) is an American expressionist painter from Cleveland, Ohio.

His paintings have been displayed in more than 150 exhibitions since the 1990s, including thirty one-person shows in Cleveland, New York City, Phoenix, and Germany. These exhibits have been reviewed in Art in America, New Art Examiner, The Washington Post, Dialogue, The Plain Dealer, and many other publications. In 1987 he was awarded the grand prize for painting at the Cleveland Museum of Art's May Show and has received Ohio Arts Council Fellowships in 1993, 1995 and 2001, and by the Artists Fellowship, Inc of New York in 2004.

As a writer he has been honored by the Cleveland Press Club and the Poets and Writers Guild of Greater Cleveland. Utter is a founding editor of Angle Magazine / A Journal of Arts and Culture, and is currently managing editor of Artefakt Magazine. His critiques and essays on the arts have been published in New Art Examiner, (Chicago), Art Papers (Atlanta), Fiberarts, Ceramics Monthly, The Plain Dealer, Artefakt, Dialogue, Northern Ohio Live, CLE Magazine, and the Cleveland Free Times.

Utter is the son of noted American biochemist Merton F. Utter, and was educated in part at Case Western Reserve University. He has taught painting and drawing courses at the University of Akron, Kent State University, and the Cleveland Institute of Art. He has two children: Christopher Utter and Elizabeth Hyler.

About his recent exhibit "Asymptotes", he says:

In geometry, an asymptote is a line or curve that approaches, but never quite meets another line. Since the mid 1980s many of my paintings have been about emotional commitment, and about the way that people touch or do not touch one another, physically and spiritually. Mainly I think intimacy is a matter of approximations; we do the best we can, but most often sympathy, for instance, can only approach empathy, unless it overshoots its goal and sinks in a welter of self-pity. In my experience it is very hard to lose oneself entirely, or give all of oneself, to a cause, or to another human being, or to the act of painting. Although most of these eighteen works on canvas deal with the situation of a single human presence, distorted by mood or circumstance, they are essentially about how hard, and how necessary, it is to try to touch.

Utter has contributed to the book about friend and colleague Stephen Kasner, Stephen Kasner WORKS: 1993–2006.
