= Salih J. Wakil =

American biochemist (1927–2019)

- صالح جواد الوكيل
- Born: August 16, 1927; Karbala, Iraq
- Died: July 11, 2019 (aged 91); Houston, Texas, US
- Awards: Pfizer Award in Enzyme Chemistry (1967); Bristol-Myers Squibb Award for Distinguished Achievement in Metabolic Diseases Research (2005)

Academic background
- Education: BSc, chemistry, 1948, American University of Beirut; PhD, biochemistry, 1952, University of Washington
- Thesis: Biosynthesis of labeled ergosterol from isotopic acetate. The origin of some of the carbon atoms of the side chain of ergosterol (1952)

Academic work
- Institutions: Baylor College of Medicine; Duke University; University of Wisconsin–Madison
- Main interests: fatty acid oxidation

Salih Jawad Wakil (Arabic: صالح جواد الوكيل; August 16, 1927 – July 11, 2019) was an American biochemist. Wakil's laboratory discovered both Acetyl CoA Carboxylase and Fatty Acid Synthetase.

== Early life ==
Wakil was born on August 16, 1927, in Karbala, Iraq to a shoemaker. After scoring in the top 5 on the national baccalaureate exam of Iraq, Wakil earned a scholarship to the American University of Beirut. Upon graduating in 1948 with a degree in chemistry, he emigrated to the United States to earn his PhD in biochemistry from the University of Washington. Upon completing his PhD, Wakil became a research associate at the Institute for Enzyme Research at the University of Wisconsin–Madison (UWM), where his research into fatty acid metabolism began.

== Career ==
During his short tenure at UWM, Wakil conducted experiments that led to the finding that fatty acids are synthesized by a pathway distinct from the reverse of their oxidation. In 1958, he was the first to isolate the intermediate in the synthesis of long-chain fatty acids from acetic acid. His laboratory also discovered both Acetyl CoA Carboxylase and Fatty Acid Synthetase, the two key enzymes of fatty acid synthesis. Wakil eventually left UWM in the same year to join the biochemistry department at Duke University.

While at Duke, Wakil identified individual enzymes forming the pathways for fatty acid synthesis in Escherichia coli. As a result of his "pioneering work in determining the structure and function of the enzymes which govern the synthesis of fatty acids in the body," he was the co-recipient of the 1967 American Chemical Society's Pfizer Award in Enzyme Chemistry. Following this, Wakil was named the winner of a John Simon Guggenheim Memorial Foundation Fellowship to study the biological function of membranes and the Life Insurance Medical Research Fund grant to study the body's production of fats.

Wakil eventually left Duke in 1971 to become the chairman of the Verna and Marrs McLean Department of Biochemistry at Baylor College of Medicine upon being recruited by Michael E. DeBakey. In 1990, Wakil was elected a member of the National Academy of Sciences. He stepped down as chair in 2006 but continued his work and mentorship until his death on July 11, 2019. In 2010, Wakil, Motonari Uesugi, and Lutfi Abu-Elheiga, founded FGH BioTech, Inc. to develop novel technology regulating fat and energy metabolism.

== Personal life ==
Wakil and his wife have four children together, who all earned medical degrees.
