= Douglas W. Mitchell =

American economist (1953–2020)

- Born: July 25, 1953
- Died: March 13, 2020 (aged 66)

Academic background
- Education: Georgia Institute of Technology, Princeton University
- Doctoral advisor: Dwight Jaffee

Academic work
- Discipline: Macroeconomics, Financial Economics
- Institutions: West Virginia University (1984-2003, Emeritus 2007-present); University of Texas (1981-1984); Temple University (1977-1981)

Douglas W. "Doug" Mitchell (July 25, 1953 - March 13, 2020) was an American economist and polymath who made significant contributions in a wide variety of areas in economics and finance (macroeconomics, banking, portfolio choice, public choice, public finance, and commodity markets) as well as in statistics and mathematics (cryptology, optimal control, econometric methods, choice under uncertainty, and elementary mathematics).

== Academic background ==
Mitchell earned a Bachelor of Science in economics from Georgia Tech (1974) and a Ph.D. from Princeton University (1978). He was a faculty member in the economics departments of Temple University, the University of Texas-Austin, and West Virginia University. He retired as a full professor from West Virginia University in 2003, at the age of 49, to devote himself more fully to wide-ranging contributions outside of economics, including editing Wikipedia.

== Career ==
In the period from 1978 to 2003, Mitchell served on 23 economics Ph.D. dissertation committees at West Virginia University, the University of Texas-Austin, and Temple University, and was the dissertation chair on 10 dissertation committees. (His students include Herbert E. Taylor and Gregory Gelles). Mitchell published 75 refereed journal articles in such journals as the American Economic Review, the Journal of Finance, Management Science, the International Economic Review, the Journal of Econometrics, The Economic Journal, the Journal of Financial and Quantitative Analysis, the Journal of Business and Economic Statistics, the Journal of Money, Credit, and Banking, Public Choice, Mathematical Gazette, and Cryptologia. He was a member of the Editorial Advisory Board of the Journal of Economics and Business for the periods 1978-1986 and 1991–1998.

== Contributions ==
Mitchell's contributions are notably diverse. In addition to publications in various subfields of economics and finance, his body of work includes contributions to mathematics, statistics, chaos theory, optimal control, and cryptology. His work in statistics which introduces a Polynomial Inverse Lag (PIL) specification for estimating time-series regression models (Mitchell and Speaker, 1986 and Speaker, Mitchell, and Gelles, 1989) is applied extensively. For instance, Kennedy (2003, p. 224), and the Shazam regression package which incorporates Mitchell and Speaker's PIL procedure as an option in OLS regression.

== Personal ==
Doug Mitchell was born in Buffalo, New York, and died on March 13, 2020, at the Cleveland Clinic. He is survived by his wife, Duo Zhang, who holds a Ph.D. in economics from West Virginia University. Surviving relatives received guests on Tuesday, March 17, at Busch Funeral and Crematory Services – Cleveland, 4334 Pearl Rd, Cleveland, OH.

== Selected publications ==
- Mitchell, Douglas W. "Explicit and Implicit Demand Deposit Interest: Substitutes or Complements from the Bank's Point of View?" Journal of Money, Credit and Banking 11, no. 2 (1979): 182–91.
- Mitchell, Douglas W. "Risk Aversion and Optimal Macro Policy." The Economic Journal 89, no. 356 (1979): 913–18.
- Mitchell, Douglas W., and Herbert E. Taylor. "Inflationary Expectations: Comment." American Economic Review 72, no. 3 (1982): 502–07.
- Mitchell, Douglas W. "Expected Inflation and Interest Rates in a Multi-Asset Model: A Note." Journal of Finance 40, no. 2 (1985): 595–99.
- Mitchell, Douglas W. and Paul J. Speaker. "A Simple, Flexible Distributed Lag Technique: The Polynomial Inverse Lag." Journal of Econometrics 31, no. 3 (1986): 329–340.
- DeCoster, Gregory P., and Douglas W. Mitchell. "Nonlinear Monetary Dynamics." Journal of Business & Economic Statistics 9, no. 4 (1991): 455–61.
- DeCoster, Gregory P., Walter C. Labys, and Douglas W. Mitchell. "Evidence of Chaos in Commodity Futures Prices." Journal of Futures Markets 12, no. 3 (1992): 291–305.
- Mitchell, Douglas W. "A nonlinear random number generator with known, long cycle length." Cryptologia 17, no. 1 (1993): 55–62.
- Mitchell, Douglas W. "Relative Risk Aversion with Arrow-Debreu Securities." International Economic Review 35, no. 1 (1994): 257–58.
- Gelles, Gregory M., and Douglas W. Mitchell. "Broadly Decreasing Risk Aversion." Management Science 45, no. 10 (1999): 1432–439.
- Mitchell, Douglas W. "88.27 More on Spreads and Non-Arithmetic Means." The Mathematical Gazette 88, no. 511 (2004): 142–44.
