= Tracy L. Johnson =

American biochemist and academic

Academic background
- Education: University of California, San Diego University of California, Berkeley California Institute of Technology
- Academic advisor: John Abelson

Academic work
- Discipline: Molecular Biology, Cellular Biology, Biochemistry
- Institutions: University of California, Los Angeles (current) Howard Hughes Medical Institute University of California, San Diego (past)
- Main interests: Gene expression, RNA synthesis, and chromatin modification.

Tracy L. Johnson is an American molecular biologist with expertise in basic mechanism of gene expression through studying RNA. In addition, Johnson dedicates efforts to include undergraduates from underrepresented groups in scientific research. She holds the Keith and Cecilia Terasaki Presidential Endowed Chair in the Life Sciences and Professor of Molecular, Cell, and Developmental Biology at the University of California, Los Angeles (UCLA). In May 2020, she was named Dean of the UCLA Division of Life Sciences.

== Research ==
Johnson's first published study examined the effects of intravertebral disc using cell implantation within sand rats. The study focused on a combination of histology, tissue culture, and immunocytochemistry. Her team used this study to determine if these rats were a good model organism for future research to start developing real-world cell therapy interventions.

Later, Johnson's research focused on understanding gene regulation, chromatin modification, RNA splicing and how regulating splicing allows cells to respond to their environment. Specifically, her group studied the spliceosome, a macromolecular "machine" made of five subunits that interacts with a pre-messenger RNA to produce an edited version, leading to appropriate translation into proteins. Through her research, Johnson hopes to outline the functions of spliceosomes in RNA splicing in order to discover how mutations may lead to the development of certain illnesses. Utilizing molecular genetic technology, her group provided evidence that spliceosome assembly around a nascent mRNA transcript is regulated by histone modifications in the chromatin of the transcribed region. Johnson has also worked on identifying and developing the structure of tri-snRNPs, a small nuclear ribonucleoprotein found within spliceosomes. These snRNPs position mRNA components in the correct position for splicing. Her work allowed for the visualization of the specific regions of interest on the spliceosome that play key roles in the RNA splicing process. She presented this research to the RNA Society in 2016.

While her study of RNA splicing is ongoing, Johnson's 2020 study investigates the role of dopamine in regulating spinal reflexes (ANS), with a focus on how the autonomic nervous system influences this process. The study explores how the presence or absence of the ANS alters the responsiveness of spinal reflexes to dopamine.

== Career and education ==
Johnson earned her B.A. in Biochemistry and Cell Biology from the University of California, San Diego and her Ph.D. in Biochemistry and Molecular Biology from the department of Molecular and Cell Biology at the University of California, Berkeley. She was a Jane Coffin Childs postdoctoral fellow at the California Institute of Technology studying the mechanisms of RNA splicing with Dr. John Abelson.

Johnson was a member of the University of California San Diego biological sciences faculty (2003-2013) where she earned many awards, including the National Science Foundation (NSF) Presidential Early Career Award for Scientists and Engineers (PECASE) and the UCSD Chancellor's Associates Award for Excellence in Undergraduate Teaching. Johnson joined the faculty of the University of California, Los Angeles in 2013 as professor of molecular, cell, and developmental biology and holder of the Keith and Cecilia Terasaki Presidential Endowed Chair. In 2014, Johnson was named a Howard Hughes Medical Institute professor which she held through 2014. Johnson was named associate dean for inclusive excellence in the division of life sciences in 2015. She was named Dean of the UCLA Division of Life Sciences in 2020.

Johnson has focused on developing programs to create transformative learning experiences for undergraduates including the UCLA-HHMI Pathways to Success Program. The program targets undergraduate students from marginalized groups with a comprehensive strategy to provide students with an authentic research experience early in their academic careers. The program has three key components: (1) A research-based laboratory course which goes by CURL (Collaborative Undergraduate Research Lab), (2) a mentoring network that integrates peer and hierarchical mentoring, and (3) intensive learning communities.

== Honors and awards ==
- Member of RNA Society
- American Society for Biochemistry and Molecular Biology's Ruth Kirschstein Diversity in Science Award (2022)
- Maria Rowena Ross Chair of Cell Biology and Biochemistry (2015)
- Associate Dean for Inclusive Excellence, UCLA Life Sciences (2015)
- Howard Hughes Medical Institute (HHMI) Professor (2014)
- Chancellor's Associates Award for Excellence in Undergraduate Teaching (2013)
- Top 20 Women Professors in California (2013)
- Jane Coffin Childs postdoctoral fellowship
- National Science Foundation (NSF) Presidential Early Career Award for Scientists and Engineers (PECASE) (2006)

== Publications ==
- Awad, A. M., Venkataramanan, S., Nag, A., Galivanche, A. R., Bradley, M. C., Neves, L. T., Douglass, S., Clarke, C. F., & Johnson, T. L. (2017). Chromatin-remodeling SWI/SNF complex regulates coenzyme Q6 synthesis and a metabolic shift to respiration in yeast. The Journal of biological chemistry, 292(36), 14851–14866.
- Awad, Agape M, et al. "Nutrient Sensing and Mitochondrial Coenzyme Q Biosynthesis: Are They Connected by a Phosphatase?" The FASEB Journal, vol. 31, no. S1, 1 Apr. 2017. ResearchGate
- Barber, P. H., Hayes, T. B., Johnson, T. L., & Márquez-Magaña, L. (2020). Systemic racism in higher education. Science (American Association for the Advancement of Science), 369(6510), 1440–1441.
- Baumgartner, B. L., Bennett, M. R., Ferry, M., Johnson, T. L., Tsimring, L. S., & Hasty, J. (2011). Antagonistic gene transcripts regulate adaptation to new growth environments. Proceedings of the National Academy of Sciences of the United States of America, 108(52), 21087–21092.
- Brangwynne, C. P., & Johnson, T. L. (2013). The micro and macro of RNA function. Molecular biology of the cell, 24(6), 679.
- Buschemeyer, W. C., 3rd, Klink, J. C., Mavropoulos, J. C., Poulton, S. H., Demark-Wahnefried, W., Hursting, S. D., Cohen, P., Hwang, D., Johnson, T. L., & Freedland, S. J. (2010). Effect of intermittent fasting with or without caloric restriction on prostate cancer growth and survival in SCID mice. The Prostate, 70(10), 1037–1043.
- Carpentier, W. R., Charles, J. B., Shelhamer, M., Hackler, A. S., Johnson, T. L., Domingo, C. M. M., Sutton, J. P., Scott, G. B. I., & Wotring, V. E. (2018). Biomedical findings from NASA's Project Mercury: a case series. NPJ microgravity, 4, 6. Fischer, H. H., Moore, S. L., Johnson, T. L., Everhart, R. M., Batal, H., & Davidsoni, A. J. (2017). Appointment reminders by text message in a safety net health care system: a pragmatic investigation. eGEMs, 5(1), 20.
- Cheng, C. S., Johnson, T. L., & Hoffmann, A. (2008). Epigenetic control: slow and global, nimble and local. Genes & development, 22(9), 1110–1114.
- Davern, M., Lepkowski, J., Call, K. T., Arnold, N., Johnson, T. L., Goldsteen, K., Todd-Malmlov, A., & Blewett, L. A. (2004). Telephone service interruption weighting adjustments for state health insurance surveys. Inquiry : a journal of medical care organization, provision and financing, 41(3), 280–290.
- Davis-Turak, J. C., Allison, K., Shokhirev, M. N., Ponomarenko, P., Tsimring, L. S., Glass, C. K., Johnson, T. L., & Hoffmann, A. (2015). Considering the kinetics of mRNA synthesis in the analysis of the genome and epigenome reveals determinants of co-transcriptional splicing. Nucleic Acids Research, 43(2), 699–707.
- Davis-Turak, J., Johnson, T. L., & Hoffmann, A. (2018). Mathematical modeling identifies potential gene structure determinants of co-transcriptional control of alternative pre-mRNA splicing. Nucleic Acids Research, 46(20), 10598–10607.
- Davis-Turak, J., Johnson, T. L., & Hoffmann, A. (2019). Mathematical modeling identifies potential gene structure determinants of co-transcriptional control of alternative pre-mRNA splicing. Nucleic Acids Research, 47(3), 1602–1603.
- Edwards, S. R., & Johnson, T. L. (2019). Intron RNA sequences help yeast cells to survive starvation. Nature, 565(7741), 578–579.
- Gruber, H. E., Johnson, T. L., Leslie, K., Ingram, J. A., Martin, D., Hoelscher, G., Banks, D., Phieffer, L., Coldham, G., & Hanley, E. N., Jr (2002). Autologous intervertebral disc cell implantation: a model using Psammomys obesus, the sand rat. Spine, 27(15), 1626–1633. https://doi.org/10.1097/00007632-200208010-00007
- Gunderson, F. Q., & Johnson, T. L. (2009). Acetylation by the transcriptional coactivator Gcn5 plays a novel role in co-transcriptional spliceosome assembly. PLoS genetics, 5(10), e1000682.
- Gunderson, F. Q., Merkhofer, E. C., & Johnson, T. L. (2011). Dynamic histone acetylation is critical for cotranscriptional spliceosome assembly and spliceosomal rearrangements. Proceedings of the National Academy of Sciences of the United States of America, 108(5), 2004–2009.
- Hossain, M. A., Claggett, J. M., Nguyen, T., & Johnson, T. L. (2009). The cap binding complex influences H2B ubiquitination by facilitating splicing of the SUS1 pre-mRNA. RNA, 15(8), 1515–1527.
- Hossain, M. A., Rodriguez, C. M., & Johnson, T. L. (2011). Key features of the two-intron Saccharomyces cerevisiae gene SUS1 contribute to its alternative splicing. Nucleic Acids Research, 39(19), 8612–8627.
- Hossain, M. A., Chung, C., Pradhan, S. K., & Johnson, T. L. (2013). The yeast cap binding complex modulates transcription factor recruitment and establishes proper histone H3K36 trimethylation during active transcription. Molecular and cellular biology, 33(4), 785–799.
- Hossain, M. A., & Johnson, T. L. (2014). Using yeast genetics to study splicing mechanisms. Methods in molecular biology, 1126, 285–298.
- Hossain, M. A., Claggett, J. M., Edwards, S. R., Shi, A., Pennebaker, S. L., Cheng, M. Y., Hasty, J., & Johnson, T. L. (2016). Posttranscriptional Regulation of Gcr1 Expression and Activity Is Crucial for Metabolic Adjustment in Response to Glucose Availability. Molecular cell, 62(3), 346–358.
- Johnson, T. L., & Vilardell, J. (2012). Regulated pre-mRNA splicing: the ghostwriter of the eukaryotic genome. Biochimica et biophysica acta, 1819(6), 538–545.
- Johnson, T. L., Tulis, D. A., Keeler, B. E., Virag, J. A., Lust, R. M., & Clemens, S. (2013). The dopamine D3 receptor knockout mouse mimics aging-related changes in autonomic function and cardiac fibrosis. PloS one, 8(8), e74116.
- Johnson, T. L., Rinehart, D. J., Durfee, J., Brewer, D., Batal, H., Blum, J., Oronce, C. I., Melinkovich, P., & Gabow, P. (2015). For many patients who use large amounts of health care services, the need is intense yet temporary. Health affairs (Project Hope), 34(8), 1312–1319.
- Johnson, T. L., Brewer, D., Estacio, R., Vlasimsky, T., Durfee, M. J., Thompson, K. R., Everhart, R. M., Rinehart, D. J., & Batal, H. (2015). Augmenting Predictive Modeling Tools with Clinical Insights for Care Coordination Program Design and Implementation. eGEMs, 3(1), 1181.
- Johnson, T. L., & Ares, M., Jr (2016). SMITten by the Speed of Splicing. Cell, 165(2), 265–267.
- Johnson, T. L., & Clemens, S. (2021). Differential dopamine modulation of spinal reflex amplitudes is associated with the presence or absence of the autonomic nervous system. Neuroscience letters, 742, 135514.
- Leung, C. S., & Johnson, T. L. (2018). The Exon Junction Complex: A Multitasking Guardian of the Transcriptome. Molecular cell, 72(5), 799–801.
- Leung, C. S., Douglass, S. M., Morselli, M., Obusan, M. B., Pavlyukov, M. S., Pellegrini, M., & Johnson, T. L. (2019). H3K36 Methylation and the Chromodomain Protein Eaf3 Are Required for Proper Cotranscriptional Spliceosome Assembly. Cell reports, 27(13), 3760–3769.e4.
- Lyu, S., Doroodchi, A., Xing, H., Sheng, Y., DeAndrade, M. P., Yang, Y., Johnson, T. L., Clemens, S., Yokoi, F., Miller, M. A., Xiao, R., & Li, Y. (2020). BTBD9 and dopaminergic dysfunction in the pathogenesis of restless legs syndrome. Brain structure & function, 225(6), 1743–1760.
- McKay, S. L., & Johnson, T. L. (2010). A bird's-eye view of post-translational modifications in the spliceosome and their roles in spliceosome dynamics. Molecular bioSystems, 6(11), 2093–2102.
- McKay, S. L., & Johnson, T. L. (2011). An investigation of a role for U2 snRNP spliceosomal components in regulating transcription. PloS one, 6(1), e16077.
- Merkhofer, E. C., & Johnson, T. L. (2012). U1 snRNA rewrites the "script". Cell, 150(1), 9–11.
- Merkhofer, E. C., Hu, P., & Johnson, T. L. (2014). Introduction to cotranscriptional RNA splicing. Methods in molecular biology, 1126, 83–96.
- Neves, L. T., Douglass, S., Spreafico, R., Venkataramanan, S., Kress, T. L., & Johnson, T. L. (2017). The histone variant H2A.Z promotes efficient cotranscriptional splicing in S. cerevisiae. Genes & development, 31(7), 702–717.
- Venkataramanan, S., Douglass, S., Galivanche, A. R., & Johnson, T. L. (2017). The chromatin remodeling complex Swi/Snf regulates splicing of meiotic transcripts in Saccharomyces cerevisiae. Nucleic Acids Research, 45(13), 7708–7721.
- Virag, J. A., Anderson, E. J., Kent, S. D., Blanton, H. D., Johnson, T. L., Moukdar, F., DeAntonio, J. H., Thayne, K., Ding, J. M., & Lust, R. M. (2013). Cardioprotection via preserved mitochondrial structure and function in the mPer2-mutant mouse myocardium. American journal of physiology. Heart and circulatory physiology, 305(4), H477–H483.
