= Merton F. Utter =

American microbiologist and biochemist (1917–1980)

Merton Franklin Utter
- Born: 23 March 1917; Westboro, Missouri, U.S.
- Died: 28 November 1980 (aged 63); Cleveland Heights, Ohio, U.S.
- Education: Simpson College; Iowa State College
- Known for: Carbon fixation Gluconeogenesis; Pyruvate carboxylase Phosphoenolpyruvate carboxykinase
- Spouse: Marjorie Manifold (m. 1939)
- Children: Douglas
- Awards: Paul-Lewis Award in Enzyme Chemistry (1956)
- Scientific career
- Fields: Biochemistry
- Workplaces: University of Minnesota; Western Reserve University; Case Western Reserve University

Merton Franklin Utter (23 March 1917 – 28 November 1980) was an American microbiologist and biochemist.

== Early life and education ==
Utter was born in Westboro, Missouri; in his first year, the family moved to New Market, Iowa, for his father's job in a bank. His mother worked as an organist in churches, which stimulated Utter's lifelong love of music. His education began in New Market. The family later moved to Coin, Iowa, where in 1934 he graduated from high school. He attended Simpson College in Indianola, Iowa, where he graduated in 1938. Merton went to graduate school until 1942 at Iowa State College; his advisor was Chester Hamlin Werkman. In 1939, he married Marjorie Manifold, who worked as a secretary for Theodore Schultz.

== Academic career ==
In 1944, Utter was appointed assistant professor at the University of Minnesota; in 1946, he became an associate professor at Western Reserve University in Cleveland, where his colleagues included Harland G. Wood, Warwick Sakami, Thomas P. Singer, Victor Lorber, Lester Krampitz, John Muntz and Robert Greenberg. His son Douglas Max Utter was born in 1950, and later became an expressionist artist. Utter was appointed full professor in 1956. Between 1965 and 1976, he was also chair of the department of biochemistry. During his time at Western Reserve (later Case Western Reserve University), he spent three years at other universities: in 1953 with the help of the Fulbright Program at the University of South Australia, in 1960 at the University of Oxford, and in 1968 at the University of Leicester, where he met Hans Kornberg daily for discussion on the way to work. He served as associate editor of the Journal of Biological Chemistry. He became a member of the American Academy of Arts and Sciences in 1972 and In 1973 was honored with membership in the National Academy of Sciences.

== Scientific contributions ==
Utter was a pioneer in the fields of bacterial and intermediary metabolism. As a graduate student and assistant professor he was involved in several classic experiments on the fixation of CO_{2} in bacteria and higher organisms. His most significant finding was that gluconeogenesis is not reverse glycolysis. He and his coworkers discovered the enzymes pyruvate carboxylase and phosphoenolpyruvate carboxykinase and their role in converting pyruvate to phosphoenolpyruvate via oxaloacetate in gluconeogenesis, a pathway not the reverse of that catalyzed in glycolysis by pyruvate kinase. They also uncovered the role of acetyl-CoA in regulating the rate of pyruvate carboxylase, one of the first discoveries of allosteric regulation. In 1966, he examined the quaternary structure of pyruvate carboxylase of chickens by means of electron microscopy, which was one of its first applications for this purpose. The enzyme was found to be a tetramer, which was later found to be true for other organisms by researchers like Gerhard Gottschalk. Later in his career, his lab became a leading center in the study of inborn errors of metabolism of pyruvate. For example, he showed that contrary to contemporary belief, Leigh disease is not associated with deficiency in pyruvate carboxylase activity.
