= Emily Balskus =

American chemical biologist, enzymologist, microbiologist, and biochemist

- Born: 1980 (age 45–46)
- Citizenship: United States
- Education: Williams College, Harvard University
- Scientific career
- Fields: Chemical Biology, Enzymology, Microbiology, Biochemistry
- Institutions: Harvard University
- Website: https://www.microbialchemist.com/

Emily P. Balskus is an American chemical biologist, enzymologist, microbiologist, and biochemist born in Cincinnati, Ohio in 1980. She has been on the faculty of the Chemistry and Chemical Biology department of Harvard University since 2011 and is currently the Morris Kahn Professor. She has published more than 80 peer-reviewed papers and three book chapters. Since 2012 she has been invited to give over 170 lectures, has held positions on various editorial boards, and served as a reviewer for ACS and Nature journals among others. Balskus also currently serves as a consultant for Novartis, Kintai Therapeutics, and Merck & Co.

== Early life and education ==
Balskus was already interested in a potential career in science in elementary school where she conducted a science fair experiment on dilution and conservation of matter. Later in high school she was introduced to chemistry and was "captivated by the excitement of manipulating molecules in lab." Later in her scientific career this evolved into her fascination of how molecules are made in living organisms. In an interview for the Blavatnik Awards for Young Scientists, Balskus reflects that she was likely inspired to go into science because all of her science teachers were women.

Balskus received a B.A. with highest honor in chemistry, summa cum laude, in 2002 from Williams College, where she published her first paper on the synthesis of (-)-hennoxazole A in the lab of professor Thomas E. Smith. She then went on to the University of Cambridge as a Churchill Scholar where she earned a M.Phil. in chemistry in the lab of Steven V. Ley. Balskus received her Ph.D. with organic chemist, Eric Jacobsen, at Harvard in 2008. There she proposed the novel idea of using an asymmetric catalyst to control chemical bond formation across large, cyclic molecules to form the favored stereoisomer. She then made the switch from organic chemistry to chemical biology as she pursued a postdoctoral fellowship from 2008 through 2011 at Harvard Medical School with natural products researcher Christopher Walsh. Together they collaborated on the biosynthesis of scytonemin, a "microbial sunscreen" used to protect microorganisms from harmful UV light. In 2009 she became a member of the Microbial Diversity Summer Course at the Marine Biology Lab at Woods Hole and received training in microbial ecology and environmental microbiology.

== Research ==
The Balskus lab's research is centered on the human microbiome, which is the trillions of commensal, symbiotic, and pathogenic microorganisms that live in and on us. These microorganisms include bacteria, protozoa, and viruses. Because of the abundance of genes in the human microbiome (200 times the amount in the human genome) many enzymes and/or their mechanisms have not been characterized. Two of Balskus' aims is therefore to elucidate the mechanisms by which these microbial enzymes perform chemistry and to identify the specific microbes, genes, and enzymes responsible for key metabolic activities. A third aim is to develop biocompatible methods to control, manipulate, and study microbial chemistry in situ.

Bioinformatics is heavily applied in the Balskus lab in order to study the extensive amount of genes of the human microbiome. Bioinformatics is the "science of storing, retrieving and analysing large amounts of biological information." Examples of bioinformatic analyses utilized in the Balskus lab are; phylogenetics, sequence alignments, homology modeling, and DNA annotation. A key accomplishment of the Balskus lab was the elucidation of the enzyme responsible for the already known conversion of choline to trimethylamine, choline trimethylamine-lyase. They identified the gene cluster required for the cleavage of the C-N bond of choline and hypothesized that it coded for a glycyl radical enzyme (GRE), a class of enzymes not previously reported to perform that type of chemistry. Sequence alignments of the gene cluster and previously functionally characterized glycyl radical enzymes as well as homology models of the suspected enzyme revealed the presence of conserved key glycine and cysteine residues in the active site, supporting the hypothesis that the enzyme is a member of the GRE family of enzymes. This research is important because choline metabolism has possible links to fish malodor syndrome, non-alcoholic fatty liver disease, atherosclerosis, and cardiovascular disease.

Another key publication, A prominent glycyl radical enzyme in human gut microbiomes metabolizes trans-4-hydroxy-L-proline outlines an important research approach utilized by Balskus and her team; chemically guided functional profiling. First an enzyme family of interest is identified (in this case, the GRE family) and the amino acid sequences of all the members are compared. With the knowledge of the structures and functions of already characterized members of the enzyme family and the amino acid residues responsible, a sequence similarity network (SSN) is constructed to group together sequences of enzymes in clusters that share biological function. The SSN is used to interpret data generated by Short-BRED, a quantitative metagenomic analysis tool which uses the amino acid sequences of the enzyme family as input. Short-BRED identifies the unique sequence markers of each group of similar members and sequentially determines their abundance in the human microbiome. This tool can be used to identify uncharacterized members and prioritize their study based on their abundance.

Biocompatible chemistry is another integral strategy in the Balskus lab. These transformations are defined as "non-enzymatic chemical reactions that interact with the metabolism of living organisms in a way that alters biological function." They have been able to develop biocompatible cyclopropanation and hydrogenation reactions to alter the reactivity of microbes by using non-enzymatic catalysts, iron(III) phthalocyanine and palladium, respectively. Another application of this approach used by Balskus is to rescue the activity of auxotrophic microbes with the use of transition metal-catalyzed reactions. This approach produces the essential nutrients that are needed for the growth and survival of the microbes by a non-native route. They were able to rescue an auxotroph lacking the ability to produce p-aminobenzoic acid (PABA), a precursor to folic acid by using a ruthenium catalyst. The success of these aforementioned approaches suggests that microbial growth and activity can be controlled and utilized for various chemical production applications.

A recent achievement (2019) of the Balskus lab was elucidating the mechanism by which the genotoxin, colibactin, damages DNA. They found that a cyclopropane "warhead" breaks the DNA strands through an alkylation reaction. Other areas of research investigated by the Balkus lab is microbe drug metabolism. In an interview with The Scientist magazine, Balskus pointed out that many drugs such as digoxin and byproducts of human metabolism can be degraded by gut bacteria, leading to lowered effects of these molecules than would be expected. Overall, the work done by the Balskus lab presents the foundational strategies needed to investigate the human microbiome and to understand how it affects our health. Their hope is to influence the development of therapeutic strategies that work not on the human host, but on their microbiome instead.

== Volunteering ==
Balskus was a co-organizer of the 2019 Keystone Symposia on chemical and biological considerations of the gut microbiota. The major charge of this conference was to "...adopt other disciplines" such as xenobiology, ecology, and interspecies communication to improve the field of microbiome research.

== Awards and honors ==
- 2020 - Alan T. Waterman Award
- 2019 - Tetrahedron Young Investigator Award
- 2019 - Laureate in Chemistry, Blavatnik Award for Young Scientists
- 2019 - Saltman Award Lecture, Metals in Biology Gordon Research Conference
- 2018 - Science News "10 Scientists to Watch"
- 2018 - Finalist, Blavatnik Award for Young Scientists
- 2018 - Arthur C. Cope Scholar Award
- 2017 - Pfizer Award in Enzyme Chemistry
- 2016 - Hirata Award, Nagoya University and the Hirata Foundation
- 2016 - HHMI-Gates Faculty Scholar
- 2015 - Chemical and Engineering News Talented Twelve
- 2015 - Camille Dreyfus Teacher-Scholar Award
- 2015 - Cottrell Scholar Award
- 2015 - NSF CAREER Award
- 2015 - ACS "Talented 12" Award
- 2014 - MIT Technology Review Innovator Under 35
- 2014 - Royal Society of Chemistry Natural Products Reports Emerging Investigator Lectureship
- 2014 - Sloan Research Fellowship
- 2014 - Thieme Chemistry Journal Awardee
- 2014 - Damon Runyon–Rachleff Innovation Award
- 2013 - George W. Merck Fellowship
- 2013 - Kavli Fellow, National Academy of Sciences
- 2012 - NIH Director's New Innovator Award
- 2012 - Searle Scholars Program
