= Kevin Burgess (chemist) =

British chemist

- Education: University of Bath; University of East Anglia; Darwin College, Cambridge
- Awards: Pedler Award (2013)
- Scientific career
- Fields: Chemistry
- Workplaces: Texas A&M University; Rice University
- Thesis: The reactions of triosium clusters with 1,3-dipolar species (1983)
- Doctoral advisor: Jack Lewis, Baron Lewis of Newnham

Kevin Burgess FRSC is a British chemist who has been Rachal Professor of Chemistry at Texas A&M University since 2004.

He was educated at the University of Bath (BSc, 1979), the University of East Anglia (MSc, 1980) and Darwin College, Cambridge (PhD, 1983). He received the Pedler Award of the Royal Society of Chemistry in 2013 and was made a Fellow in the same year. He has an h-index of 81 according to Google Scholar.
