= JoAnne Stubbe =

American chemist

- Stubbe receiving National Medal of Science in 2009
- Born: June 11, 1946 (age 80); Champaign, Illinois, U.S.
- Education: University of Pennsylvania (BS); University of California, Berkeley (PhD)
- Known for: ribonucleotide reductases
- Scientific career
- Fields: Biochemistry
- Workplaces: Massachusetts Institute of Technology
- Doctoral advisor: George Kenyon
- Other academic advisors: Stephen J. Lippard; Julius Rebek; Robert Abeles
- Doctoral students: Squire Booker

JoAnne Stubbe (born June 11, 1946) is an American chemist best known for her work on ribonucleotide reductases, for which she was awarded the National Medal of Science in 2009. In 2017, she retired as a professor of chemistry and biology at the Massachusetts Institute of Technology.

== Career and education ==
In 1946, Stubbe was born in Champaign, Illinois. In 1968, Stubbe received a B.S. degree in chemistry from the University of Pennsylvania, and worked as an undergraduate in the laboratory of Professor Edward R. Thornton. After she received her Ph.D. degree in organic chemistry under the guidance of Professor George Kenyon from the University of California, Berkeley, in 1971, she did a very brief stint (1971–1972) as a postdoc at UCLA, where she worked on synthesizing LSD from tryptophan with Julius Rebek. Then, Stubbe taught at Williams College (1972–1977) discovered she didn't want to teach, but wanted to do research. Her realization sent her to Brandeis University (1975–1977), where she did a second postdoc with Robert Abeles. This is where she learned the art and science of creating mechanism-based enzyme inhibitors. She also taught at Yale School of Medicine (1977–1980) as an assistant professor in the department of pharmacology.

In 1980, she moved to the University of Wisconsin, serving as assistant professor in the Biochemistry Department and rising to full professor in 1985. She was an assistant professor for a total of 12 years. In 1987, Stubbe became a professor in the MIT Chemistry Department, where she became the first woman to receive tenure in that department. She received a joint appointment in the MIT Biology Department in 1990.

In 1994, Stubbe was one of 16 women faculty in the School of Science at MIT who drafted and co-signed a letter to the then-Dean of Science (and later Chancellor of Berkeley) Robert Birgeneau, which started a campaign to highlight and challenge gender discrimination at MIT.

== Research ==
Stubbe has published over 300 scientific papers and has been frequently recognized for her research achievements. Before Stubbe's work, there were no chemical mechanisms that could be written for certain enzymes. She revolutionized the biochemistry field with her first two scientific papers on enzymes enolase and pyruvate kinase.

Her first two publications in scientific journals showed the mechanisms for reactions that involved the enzymes enolase that metabolizes carbohydrates, and pyruvate kinase. Her first groundbreaking experiments were carried out in the late 1970s and early 1980s, while she was at Yale, then the University of Wisconsin. She was trying to understand how the hydroxyl group at the 2' position of the ribonucleotide's sugar was replaced by the hydrogen found in deoxyribonucleotides. To perform these experiments, she had to synthesize nucleotides that carried a heavy isotope at specific positions. Stubbe reportedly kept a bed in her office since she worked around the clock on her experiments. Stubbe pioneered the use of spectroscopic investigations of enzyme interactions and has devoted most of her career to elucidating the biochemical mechanisms behind free radicals. In her early work at Yale and then at the University of Wisconsin, Stubbe discovered how enzymes called ribonucleotide reductases use free-radical chemistry to convert nucleotides into deoxynucleotides, an essential process in DNA repair and replication. These enzymes catalyze the rate-determining step in DNA biosynthesis. Her analysis of the nucleotide reduction process shed light on the mechanism of action of the Eli Lilly & Co. anti-cancer drug gemcitabine, which is used to treat various carcinomas, such as pancreatic cancer, breast cancer, and non-small cell lung cancer.

Stubbe, in collaboration with John Kozarich, also elucidated the structure and function of bleomycin, an antibiotic that is commonly used to treat cancer. They discovered how bleomycin induces DNA strand breaks in tumor cells, which in turn induces apoptosis.

Before retiring, Stubbe studied the function of ribonucleotide reductases and the mechanisms of clinically useful drugs. She also extended her research into polyhydroxybutyrates, a class of biodegradable polymers that can be synthesized by bacteria under certain conditions and then converted into plastics. Stubbe's other research interests included the design of so-called suicide inhibitors and mechanisms of DNA repair enzymes.

Stubbe was active on several committees, including review boards for the NIH grants committee and the editorial boards for various scientific journals.

== Personal life ==
Stubbe's parents were teachers, and that is why she thought teaching is what she originally wanted to do as a career. Stubbe had a pet dog named Dr. McEnzyme Stubbe. The dog was a part of the research group and had its own email address and picture on the group's website.

== Scientific societies ==
- 1991 American Academy of Arts and Sciences
- 1992 United States National Academy of Sciences (Biochemistry section)
- 2004 American Philosophical Society
- American Chemical Society
- American Society for Biological Chemists
- Protein Society

== Awards and honors ==
- 1986 Pfizer Award in Enzyme Chemistry
- 1989 ICI – Stuart Pharmaceutical Award for Excellence in Chemistry
- 1990 MIT teaching award
- 1991 American Academy of Arts and Sciences Fellow Award
- 1992 Myron L. Bender and Muriel S. Bender Distinguished Summer Lecturer, Northwestern University
- 1993 Arthur C. Cope Scholar Award of the American Chemical Society
- 1996 Richards Medal from northeastern section of ACS
- 1997 Alfred Bader Award in Bioinorganic or Bioorganic Chemistry of the American Chemical Society
- 1998 F.A. Cotton Medal for Excellence in Chemical Research of the American Chemical Society
- 2004 Repligen Award
- 2005 John Scott Award
- 2008 Protein Society Emil Thomas Kaiser Award
- 2008 National Academy of Sciences Award in Chemical Sciences
- 2008 Kirkwood Medal
- 2009 American Chemical Society's Nakanishi Prize for identifying the role of radical intermediates in ribonucleotide reductase functions.
- 2009 National Medal of Science "for her groundbreaking experiments establishing the mechanisms of ribonucleotide reductases, polyester synthases, and natural product DNA cleavers — compelling demonstrations of the power of chemical investigations to solve problems in biology."
- 2009 Prelog Medal, Laboratory of Organic Chemistry at the Swiss Federal Institute of Technology, Zurich
- 2010 Benjamin Franklin Medal in Chemistry of The Franklin Institute for uncovering the intricate processes by which cells safely use free radicals, for developing new cancer treatments, and for improving the production of environmentally-friendly polymers.
- 2010 Welch Award for "fundamental research in biochemistry and enzymology."
- 2010 Murray Goodman Memorial Prize
- 2013 Honorary doctor of the Harvard University
- 2014 Penn Chemistry Distinguished Alumni Award
- 2015 American Chemical Society Remsen Award
- 2017 Pearl Meister Greengard Prize
- 2020 American Chemical Society Priestley Medal
