= Squire Booker =

American biochemist (born 1965)

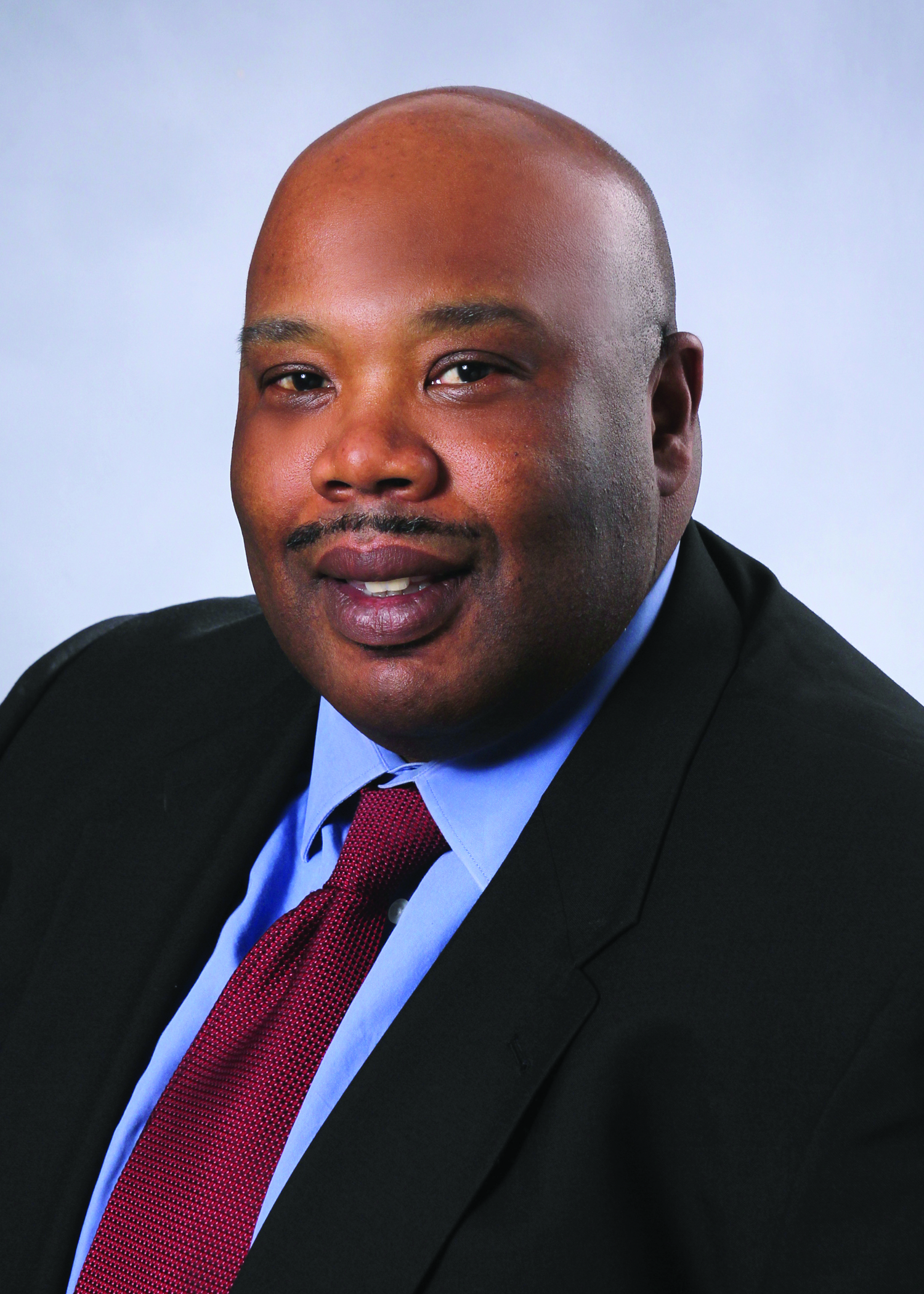
- Born: September 9, 1965 (age 60); Beaumont, Texas
- Education: B.A. in Chemistry at Austin College (1987) Ph.D. in Biochemistry at Massachusetts Institute of Technology (1994); NSF-NATO Postdoctoral Fellow (1994-1995) NIH Postdoctoral Fellow at the Institute for Enzyme Research at the University of Wisconsin (1996-1999)
- Known for: Biochemistry research with iron-sulfur clusters enzymes
- Awards: Presidential Early Career Award in Science and Engineering (2004) American Chemical Society Arthur C. Cope Scholar Award (2011); Howard Hughes Medical Institute Investigator (2015) Associate Editor for the American Chemical Society Biochemistry Journal (2019)
- Scientific career
- Workplaces: Penn State University (1999-Present)

Squire Booker is an American biochemist at The Pennsylvania State University. Booker directs an interdisciplinary chemistry research program related to fields of biochemistry, enzymology, protein chemistry, natural product biosynthesis, and mechanisms of radical dependent enzymes. He is an associate editor for the American Chemical Society Biochemistry Journal, is a Hughes Medical Institute Investigator, and an Eberly Distinguished Chair in Science at Penn State University.

== Early life ==
Booker was born September 9, 1965. He grew up in the segregated community of Beaumont, Texas. He was raised by his grandmother with the help of three uncles. Squire Booker's career was particularly influenced by two of his uncles. One worked at NASA and sparked his interest in astronomy, while the other was a math teacher who inspired his curiosity for solving complex problems. This led him to choose chemistry as his major in college, which combined his interests in math and science.

== Education ==
Booker received his B.A. in chemistry at Austin College in 1987, where he was a Minnie Stevens Piper Scholar. He received his Ph.D. in biochemistry from Massachusetts Institute of Technology in 1994, and conducted postdoctoral research at Universite Rene Decartes in Paris, France and held a postdoctoral fellowship at the Institute for Enzyme Research at the University of Wisconsin. He became a professor at Penn State University in 1999, where he earned tenure in 2005.

== Research ==
Booker is a professor of biology, biochemistry, and molecular biology at Penn State University. His research explores how enzymes change their catalytic abilities due to metal ions or metal clusters. His research focuses on enzymes containing iron-sulfur clusters which catalyze chemical reactions. He focuses on the Radical S-adenosylamethionine Superfamily (SAM) which is a group of enzymes that encounters radical chemistry in post-transcriptional and post-translational modifications of DNA.

He also researches many bacteria including Staphylococcus aureus, which is found in the nasal cavity and on the skin in humans. S. aureus is problematic because it can mutate into the superbug methicillin-resistant S. aureus (MRSA). There is a protein called Cfr protein in S. aureus that binds to ribosomes which is where translation occurs. Many antibiotics bind to ribosomes which cause bacteria to die. However, when Cfr is expressed, it binds to the ribosome and allows the bacteria to stay alive which is known as methylation

This research has led Booker to discover that S. aureus expresses a protein, Cfr, which makes it resistant to many antibiotics. He developed mechanism of this methylation. Booker's lab also researches aspects of the bacterium, Escherichia coli. He determined the three-dimensional structure of the RImN protein from the bacteria. RImN is one of two proteins which makes chemical modification to different RNA molecules. Understanding this structure will help with other research of antibiotic resistance. As a result of his research, he is synthesizing new compounds to stop the bacteria's defenses which would make antibiotics more effective. The goal of his research to design compounds which can prevent infections due to drug-resistant bacteria.

== Activism ==
Booker is active in promoting diversity in Science, Technology, Engineering, and Mathematics (STEM) especially towards undergraduate and graduate students. He was a chair on the Minority Affairs Committee of the American Association of Biochemistry and Molecular Biology. In 2010, he helped organize a workshop which discussed the different obstacles and challenges that minorities in biochemistry and molecular biology encounter when building externally funded research programs.

Booker was the guest speaker at Massachusetts Institute of Technology's 2019 Investiture of Doctoral Hoods and Degree Conferral Ceremony. He was chosen due to his impressive contributions to the scientific community and his activism towards inclusion of all in STEM. In his speech, he emphasized an opportunity for all in science. He encouraged the graduates to take responsibility and give back to society. It does not matter what one's background is in, people in STEM need to be willing to accept and stand up for each other.

== Honors and awards ==
Booker has received numerous honor and awards:

- 2022 Hans Neurath Award from the Protein Society
- 2019 Associate Editor for the American Chemical Society Biochemistry Journal
- 2018 Evan Pugh Professor at Penn State University
- 2017 Eberly Distinguished Chair in Science at Penn State University
- 2017 Elected to the American Academy of Arts and Sciences
- 2017 Lloyd N. Ferguson Distinguished Lecturer at Cal State, Los Angeles
- 2016 Penn State Faculty Scholar Medal
- 2016 Scott Lectureship in Chemistry and Biochemistry at the University of Florida
- 2016 Co-organizer of the ASBMB Annual Meeting
- 2015 Selected as a Hughes Medical Investigator
- 2015 Everson Lectureship in Biochemistry at the University of Wisconsin, Madison
- 2014 Fellow of the American Association for the Advancement of Science
- 2013 TY Shen Lectureship in Biological Chemistry at MIT
- 2011 American Chemical Society Arthur C. Cope Scholar Award
- 2006 co-chair, GRC on Enzyme Coenzymes and Metabolic Pathways
- 2004 Presidential Early Career Award in Science and Engineering
- 2002-2007 NSF Faculty Early Career Award
- 1996-1999 NIH Postdoctoral Fellow at the Institute for Enzyme Research at the University of Wisconsin
- 1994-1995 NSF-NATO Postdoctoral Fellow

== Selected publications ==
Booker has published over 100 scientific publications in journals such as the Journal of the American Chemical Society and Proceedings of the National Academy of Sciences. Here are some of the most cited publications:

- Grove, T. L.; Benner, J. S.; Radle, M. I.; Ahlum, J. H.; Landgraf, B. J.; Krebs, C.; Booker, S. J. (2011). "A Radically Different Mechanism for S-Adenosylmethionine-Dependent Methyltransferases". Science. 332 (6029): 604–607. Bibcode:2011Sci...332..604G. doi:10.1126/science.1200877. PMID 21415317. S2CID 2214309.
- Matthews, M. L.; Neumann, C. S.; Miles, L. A.; Grove, T. L.; Booker, S. J.; Krebs, C.; Walsh, C. T.; Bollinger, J. M. (2009). "Substrate positioning controls the partition between halogenation and hydroxylation in the aliphatic halogenase, SyrB2". Proceedings of the National Academy of Sciences. 106 (42): 17723–17728. Bibcode:2009PNAS..10617723M. doi:10.1073/pnas.0909649106. PMC 2764930. PMID 19815524.
- Boal, A. K.; Grove, T. L.; McLaughlin, M. I.; Yennawar, N. H.; Booker, S. J.; Rosenzweig, A. C. (2011). "Structural Basis for Methyl Transfer by a Radical SAM Enzyme". Science. 332 (6033): 1089–1092. Bibcode:2011Sci...332.1089B. doi:10.1126/science.1205358. PMC 3506250. PMID 21527678.
