= Michael Marletta =

American biochemist

- Born: Rochester, New York, U.S.
- Education: State University of New York at Fredonia; UC San Francisco
- Scientific career
- Workplaces: University of Michigan; University of California, Berkeley; The Scripps Research Institute

Michael A. Marletta (born February 12, 1951) is an American chemist and biochemist whose research focuses on the molecular mechanisms of biological signaling, enzyme function, and gas sensing. He is a Professor of the Graduate School at the University of California, Berkeley, where his research has examined nitric oxide signaling, nitric oxide synthase, soluble guanylate cyclase, and heme-containing sensor proteins. His work has contributed to understanding how nitric oxide functions as a biological signaling molecule in processes including blood vessel regulation, immune responses, and nervous system activity. He has also carried out research on enzymes involved in the breakdown of cellulose. Marletta served as president and chief executive officer of the Scripps Research Institute from 2012 to 2014.

== Early life and education ==
He was born in Rochester, New York, the son of an Italian immigrant mother and a first generation Italian father. He graduated from the State University of New York at Fredonia in 1973 with an A.B. degree in biology and chemistry, and from the University of California, San Francisco, in 1978 with a Ph.D. degree in pharmaceutical chemistry, where he studied with George Kenyon. He was a postdoctoral fellow with Christopher T. Walsh at MIT from 1978 to 1980.

== Career ==
Marletta began his academic career at MIT, where he joined the faculty in 1980 as an assistant professor of toxicology. He became an associate professor in 1986 and moved to the University of Michigan in 1987. At Michigan, he held appointments in medicinal chemistry and biological chemistry and was named the John G. Searle Professor of Medicinal Chemistry in 1991. He became an investigator of the Howard Hughes Medical Institute in 1997.

In 2001, Marletta joined the faculty of the University of California, Berkeley, as a professor of chemistry and biochemistry. He held appointments in the Departments of Chemistry and Molecular and Cell Biology and served as a faculty scientist in the Physical Biosciences Division at Lawrence Berkeley National Laboratory. He also co-founded and co-directed Berkeley's Chemical Biology Graduate Program and chaired the Department of Chemistry from 2005 to 2010.

In 2011, Marletta was named president-elect of the Scripps Research Institute in La Jolla, California.He became president and chief executive officer in 2012 and held the Cecil H. and Ida M. Green Professorship in Chemistry during his tenure. He left the institute in 2014 and returned to UC Berkeley in 2015, resuming his academic research and teaching. He subsequently held the C. H. and Annie Li Chair in the Molecular Biology of Diseases (2015-23) and then the Class of 1936 Chair (2024-26). In 2026 he was appointed Professor of the Graduate School and Distinguished Professor emeritus of Chemistry and Molecular and Cell Biology.

Marletta has participated in scientific advisory boards, professional societies, and editorial activities. His service has included the editorial boards of journals such as Biochemistry, Chemistry & Biology, and the Proceedings of the National Academy of Sciences of the United States of America.

== Research ==
=== Nitric oxide and biological signaling ===
A central focus of Marletta's research has been nitric oxide (NO), a small, reactive molecule that functions as a signaling agent in biological systems. His work helped establish the biochemical basis for nitric oxide production and its roles in processes such as blood vessel dilation, immune defense, and neuronal signaling.

Marletta investigated nitric oxide synthase, the enzyme responsible for producing nitric oxide in mammalian cells. His research examined the enzyme's catalytic mechanism, structure, regulation, and dependence on cofactors.

=== Soluble guanylate cyclase ===
Marletta's research has also examined soluble guanylate cyclase (sGC), an integral receptor for nitric oxide that initiates cellular signaling. The enzyme contains a heme group that selectively binds nitric oxide, triggering changes in enzyme activity. His laboratory investigated how the protein specifically recognizes nitric oxide and translates its binding into a biochemical response.

In collaboration with structural biologists, his group used structural and biochemical methods to investigate the architecture of sGC and its activation mechanism. This research contributed to a molecular understanding of how nitric oxide signaling is regulated and how heme-containing proteins distinguish among gaseous molecules. It also provided a structural basis for the action of drugs such as Adempas®.

=== Heme-based gas sensors ===
Marletta and his collaborators studied H-NOX proteins, heme-containing proteins that detect gases such as nitric oxide, oxygen and carbon monoxide. Found in bacteria and eukaryotes, these proteins play a role in cellular signaling. His research examined how their structures determine gas binding and recognition. Studies of bacterial H-NOX proteins also investigated their role in microbial signaling, including the regulation of biofilm formation. This work contributed to understanding how soluble guanylate cyclase selectively binds nitric oxide.

Polysaccharide monooxygenases and cellulose degradation

Marletta has also studied polysaccharide monooxygenases (PMOs), copper-containing enzymes that break down complex carbohydrates such as cellulose through oxidation. These enzymes work alongside carbohydrate-degrading enzymes that use hydrolysis. His research with collaborators examined the structure and activity of PMOs and their role in the breakdown of plant biomass. The findings have implications for research into biomass conversion and biofuel production. PMOs found in some disease-associated microorganisms have also prompted studies of their roles in host–microbe interactions.

== Selected publications ==
- Marletta, Michael A. (1994). "Nitric oxide synthase: Aspects concerning structure and catalysis". Cell. 78 (6): 927–930. doi:10.1016/0092-8674(94)90268-2. ISSN 0092-8674. PMID 7522970.
- Ballou, David P.; Zhao, Yunde; Brandish, Philip E.; Marletta, Michael A. (2002-09-03). "Revisiting the kinetics of nitric oxide (NO) binding to soluble guanylate cyclase: The simple NO-binding model is incorrect". Proceedings of the National Academy of Sciences. 99 (19): 12097–12101. Bibcode:2002PNAS...9912097B. doi:10.1073/pnas.192209799. ISSN 0027-8424. PMC 129404. PMID 12209005.
- Plate, Lars; Marletta, Michael A. (2013). "Nitric oxide-sensing H-NOX proteins govern bacterial communal behavior". Trends in Biochemical Sciences. 38 (11): 566–575. doi:10.1016/j.tibs.2013.08.008. ISSN 0968-0004. PMC 3819143. PMID 24113192.
- Campbell, Melody G.; Underbakke, Eric S.; Potter, Clinton S.; Carragher, Bridget; Marletta, Michael A. (2014-02-10). "Single-particle EM reveals the higher-order domain architecture of soluble guanylate cyclase". Proceedings of the National Academy of Sciences. 111 (8): 2960–2965. Bibcode:2014PNAS..111.2960C. doi:10.1073/pnas.1400711111. ISSN 0027-8424. PMC 3939929. PMID 24516165.
- Vu, Van V.; Beeson, William T.; Phillips, Christopher M.; Cate, Jamie H. D.; Marletta, Michael A. (2013-12-26). "Determinants of Regioselective Hydroxylation in the Fungal Polysaccharide Monooxygenases". Journal of the American Chemical Society. 136 (2): 562–565. doi:10.1021/ja409384b. ISSN 0002-7863. PMID 24350607.
- Beeson, William T.; Vu, Van V.; Span, Elise A.; Phillips, Christopher M.; Marletta, Michael A. (2015-06-02). "Cellulose Degradation by Polysaccharide Monooxygenases". Annual Review of Biochemistry. 84 (1): 923–946. Bibcode:2015ARBio..84..923B. doi:10.1146/annurev-biochem-060614-034439. ISSN 0066-4154. PMID 25784051.
- Marletta, Michael A. (2021-06-07). "Revisiting Nitric Oxide Signaling: Where Was It, and Where Is It Going?". Biochemistry. 60 (46): 3491–3496. doi:10.1021/acs.biochem.1c00276. ISSN 0006-2960. PMC 8714492. PMID 34096266.

== Awards ==
- 2024 Elected to the American Institute for Medical and Biological Engineering.
- 2018 Honorary Doctor of Science, State University of New York
- 2016 Elected to the American Philosophical Society
- 2015 Alfred Bader Award in Bioorganic or Bioinorganic Chemistry and the UCSF 150th Anniversary Alumni Excellence Award.
- 2014 Distinguished Alumnus recognition from the American Association of State Colleges and Universities.
- 2013 Elected to the National Academy of Inventors.
- 2009 Fellow of the Royal Society of Chemistry.
- 2008 Murray Goodman Memorial Prize.
- 2006 Elected to the National Academy of Sciences
- 2004 Harrison Howe Awardee
- 2001 Elected to the American Academy of Arts and Sciences and named a fellow of the American Association for the Advancement of Science.
- 1999 Elected to the Institute of Medicine
- 1995 MacArthur Fellows Program
- 1991 George H. Hitchings Award for Innovative Methods in Drug Discovery and Design.
