= RNA Biology =

- Discipline: RNA
- Language: English
- Edited by: Alain Laederach

Publication details
- History: 2004-present
- Publisher: Taylor & Francis
- Frequency: Annually
- Open access: Yes
- Impact factor: 3.4 (2024)

Standard abbreviations
- ISO 4: RNA Biol.

Indexing
- ISSN: 1555-8584
- LCCN: 2003215637
- OCLC no.: 53480455

Links
- Journal homepage; RNA Biology, Volume 22, Issue 1 (2025)

RNA Biology is an open access peer-reviewed scientific journal in the field of ribonucleic acid (RNA) research. It is indexed for MEDLINE. The current editor-in-chief is Alain Laederach (University of North Carolina). Since 2022, it has converted to a full Open Access and exclusively online journal.

== Wikipedia initiative ==
The journal launched a new section for descriptions of families of RNA molecules in December 2008 and requires contributing authors to also submit a draft article on the RNA family for publication in Wikipedia. The journal submits the draft article to peer review and then publish it in Wikipedia. This initiative is a collaboration between the journal and the consortium that produces the Rfam database of RNA families.

== Abstracting and indexing ==
The journal is abstracted and indexed in:

- MEDLINE/PubMed
- Science Citation Index Expanded
- Scopus
- Web of Science
- DOAJ
- BIOSIS Previews
- Biological Abstracts
- Chemical Abstracts
- Reactions Weekly
- Biochemistry and Biophysics Citation Index

== Journal metrics ==
- Impact factor - 3.4 (2024) (quartile Q2)
- 5-year impact factor - 3.9 (2024)
- CiteScore (Scopus) - 8.6 (2024) (quartile Q1)
- SNIP - 0.767 (2024)
- SJR - 1.651 (2024)
