= Michael H. Gelb =

American biochemist (1957)

- Born: 1957 (age 68–69)
- Education: University of California, Davis, Yale University (PhD)
- Known for: Routine newborn screening of lysosomal storage diseases
- Awards: Gustavus John Esselen Award of the American Chemical Society
- Scientific career
- Fields: Chemistry and biochemistry
- Workplaces: University of Washington
- Doctoral advisor: Stephen G. Sliga

Professor Michael H. Gelb (born 1957) is an American biochemist and chemist specializing in enzymes and particularly those of medical significance. He is the Boris and Barbara L. Weinstein Endowed Chair in Chemistry at the University of Washington in Seattle. He also teaches Honors Organic Chemistry, Chemical Biology and Enzymology.

== Education ==
Gelb studied chemistry and biochemistry at the University of California, Davis before taking a Ph.D. under Stephen G. Sligar at Yale University on aspects of the catalytic mechanism of cytochrome P450. Granted an American Cancer Society postdoctoral fellowship, he then investigated mechanism-based inactivators of serine proteases and developed fluorinated ketones as tight-binding inhibitors of several classes of proteases, working with Robert H. Abeles at Brandeis University.

== Professional life ==
Since 1985 Gelb has been a faculty member at the University of Washington in the Departments of Chemistry and Biochemistry. In order to investigate enzymatic processes of biomedical importance, the Gelb laboratory employs a variety of methods from molecular and cellular biochemistry as well as synthetic organic chemistry. Major accomplishments from the Gelb laboratory include: 1) The discovery of protein isoprenylation in the late 1980s (together with Professor John Glomset);2) The development of methods to analyze enzymes that work on membrane surfaces (together with Professors Mahindra Jain and Otto Berg);3) The development of Isotope-Coded Affinity Tags for quantitative proteomics (together with Professors Ruedi Aebersold and Frank Turecek); 4) The development of tandem mass spectrometry for newborn screening of enzyme deficiency diseases(together with Professors Frank Turecek and C. Ronald Scott); 5) The development of drug candidates to treat infectious diseases caused by tropical parasites (in collaboration with Prof. Frederick Buckner). 6) Most of the new diseases added to newborn screening panels worldwide are based on biochemical assays first developed in the Gelb laboratory. 7)His current research interest is focused on the continuation of development of new assays for newborn screening of actionable diseases in children as well as biochemical assays to support whole genome sequencing-based newborn screening.

== Awards ==
Gelb’s awards include:

- Catalyst Award (2026) from the World Symposium in Lysosomal Disorder. Harry Hannon Laboratory Improvement Award in Newborn Screening, American Public Health Laboratories (2025)
- Revvity Robert Guthrie Award (2022) for Newborn Screening, International Society of Neonatal Screening
- Repligen Award in Chemistry of Biological Processes (2018), American Chemical Society
- Gustavus John Esselen Award (2013) for Chemistry in the Public Interest, NE Section, American Chemical Society.
- Fellow of the American Association for the Advancement of Science (AAAS) (2009–)
- Harry and Catherine Jaynne Boand Endowed Professor of Chemistry (2008–)
- Merit Award from the National Institutes of Health (2007–)
- Medicines for Malaria Venture Project of the Year (2002)
- Pfizer Award in Enzyme Chemistry, American Chemical Society (1993)
- ICI Pharmaceuticals Award for Excellence in Chemistry (1993)
- Alfred P. Sloan Fellow
- Merck New Faculty Development Award (1986)
- American Cancer Society Postdoctoral Fellowship (1983–85)
