= List of members of the National Academy of Sciences (biochemistry) =

This list is a subsection of the List of members of the National Academy of Sciences, which includes members and international members of the United States National Academy of Sciences, living and deceased, each affiliated with one of the academy's disciplinary sections. Members are listed under their primary section, and each entry gives the person's name, primary institution, and election year. For deceased members, the year of death is noted.

Name	Institution	Year
Robert H. Abeles (died 2000)	Brandeis University	1976
John Abelson	California Institute of Technology	1985
Julius Adler (died 2024)	University of Wisconsin–Madison	1978
Paul Ahlquist	University of Wisconsin–Madison	1993
Natalie G. Ahn	University of Colorado Boulder	2018
Bruce Alberts	University of California, San Francisco	1981
Jorge E. Allende	University of Chile	2001
Sidney Altman (died 2022)	Yale University	1990
Bruce Ames (died 2024)	University of California, Berkeley	1972
Christian B. Anfinsen (died 1995)	Johns Hopkins University School of Medicine	1963
Daniel I. Arnon (died 1994)	University of California, Berkeley	1961
Gilbert Ashwell (died 2014)	National Institutes of Health	1979
Tania Baker	Massachusetts Institute of Technology	2007
Clinton Ballou (died 2021)	University of California, Berkeley	1975
Horace Barker (died 2000)	University of California, Berkeley	1953
David P. Bartel	Massachusetts Institute of Technology	2011
Jacqueline Barton	California Institute of Technology	2002
Brenda Bass	University of Utah School of Medicine	2015
Philip Beachy	Stanford University School of Medicine	2002
Lorena S. Beese	Duke University Medical Center	2009
Marlene Belfort	New York State Department of Health	1999
Stephen P. Bell	Massachusetts Institute of Technology	2017
James M. Berger	Johns Hopkins University School of Medicine	2013
Sune Bergström (died 2004)	Karolinska Institutet	1973
Klaus Biemann (died 2016)	Massachusetts Institute of Technology	1993
Pamela Björkman	California Institute of Technology	2001
Elizabeth Blackburn	University of California, San Francisco	1993
Konrad E. Bloch (died 2000)	Harvard University	1956
Elkan Blout (died 2006)	Harvard University	1969
Squire J. Booker	University of Pennsylvania	2019
Michael Botchan	University of California, Berkeley	2008
Herbert Boyer	University of California, San Francisco	1985
Paul D. Boyer (died 2018)	University of California, Los Angeles	1970
Roscoe Brady (died 2016)	National Institutes of Health	1975
Alexander E. Braunstein (died 1986)	USSR Academy of Medical Sciences	1974
Ronald Breaker	Yale University	2013
Joan B. Broderick	Montana State University	2022
Patrick O. Brown	Impossible Foods	2002
John Buchanan (died 2007)	Massachusetts Institute of Technology	1962
Walter B. Cannon (died 1945)	Harvard Medical School	1914
Giulio Cantoni (died 2005)	National Institutes of Health	1983
John Carbon	University of California, Santa Barbara	1986
Dana Carroll	University of Utah School of Medicine	2017
H. E. Carter (died 2007)	University of Arizona	1953
Thomas R. Cech	University of Colorado Boulder	1987
Michael Chamberlin (died 2025)	University of California, Berkeley	1986
Britton Chance (died 2010)	University of Pennsylvania	1954
Erwin Chargaff (died 2002)	Columbia University	1965
Aaron Ciechanover	Technion-Israel Institute of Technology	2007
W. Wallace Cleland (died 2013)	University of Wisconsin–Madison	1985
Philip Cohen	University of Dundee	2008
Seymour Cohen (died 2018)	Marine Biological Laboratory	1967
Mildred Cohn (died 2009)	University of Pennsylvania	1971
Kathleen Collins (died 1988)	University of California, Berkeley	2025
Sidney Colowick (died 1985)	Vanderbilt University	1972
Joan W. Conaway	UT Southwestern Medical Center	2020
Elena Conti	Max Planck Institute of Biochemistry	2025
Minor Coon (died 2018)	University of Michigan	1983
Carl F. Cori (died 1984)	Harvard University	1940
Nicholas R. Cozzarelli (died 2006)	University of California, Berkeley	1989
Nancy Craig	Johns Hopkins University	2010
Patrick Cramer	Max Planck Institute for Multidisciplinary Sciences	2020
Benjamin Cravatt III	Scripps Research	2014
James Dahlberg	University of Wisconsin–Madison	1996
Seth Darst	Rockefeller University	2008
Earl Davie (died 2020)	University of Washington	1980
Christian de Duve (died 2013)	Université catholique de Louvain	1975
Hector DeLuca	University of Wisconsin–Madison	1979
Peter Dervan	California Institute of Technology	1986
Raymond Deshaies	Amgen	2016
John F.X. Diffley	Francis Crick Institute	2020
Zacharias Dische (died 1988)	Columbia University	1976
Jack Dixon	University of California, San Diego	2000
Edward A. Doisy (died 1986)	Saint Louis University	1938
Russell Doolittle (died 2019)	University of California, San Diego	1984
Paul M. Doty (died 2011)	Harvard University	1957
Jennifer Doudna	University of California, Berkeley	2002
Catherine L. Drennan	Massachusetts Institute of Technology	2023
Gideon Dreyfuss	University of Pennsylvania	2012
Gerald Edelman (died 2014)	The Scripps Research Institute	1969
Isidore S. Edelman (died 2004)	Columbia University	1973
Mary Edmonds (died 2005)	University of Pittsburgh	1991
John T. Edsall (died 2002)	Harvard University	1951
Michael B. Elowitz	California Institute of Technology	2022
Ronald Estabrook (died 2013)	University of Texas Southwestern Medical Center at Dallas	1979
Gerald D. Fasman (died 2003)	Brandeis University	1994
Gary Felsenfeld (died 2024)	National Institutes of Health	1976
Edmond Fischer (died 2021)	University of Washington	1973
Heinz Fraenkel-Conrat (died 1999)	University of California, Berkeley	1974
Perry A. Frey	University of Wisconsin–Madison	1998
Irwin Fridovich (died 2019)	Duke University	1981
Morris E. Friedkin (died 2002)	University of California, San Diego	1978
Joseph S. Fruton (died 2007)	Yale University	1952
Judith Frydman	Stanford University	2021
Mariano A. Garcia-Blanco	University of Virginia	2025
E. Peter Geiduschek (died 2022)	University of California, San Diego	1974
Quentin Gibson (died 2011)	Rice University	1982
Lila M. Gierasch	University of Massachusetts Amherst	2019
Alexander Glazer (died 2021)	University of California System	2001
Sam Granick (died 1977)	Rockefeller Institute for Medical Research	1965
David Green (died 1983)	University of Wisconsin-Madison	1962
Rachel Green	Johns Hopkins University	2012
Carol Greider	University of California, Santa Cruz	2003
Jack D. Griffith	University of North Carolina at Chapel Hill	2018
Marianne Grunberg-Manago (died 2013)	Institut de Biologie Physico-Chimique	1982
Michael Grunstein (died 2024)	University of California, Los Angeles	2008
Irwin Gunsalus (died 2008)	University of Illinois at Urbana–Champaign	1965
Lowell Hager (died 2014)	University of Illinois at Urbana–Champaign	1995
Sen-itiroh Hakomori	Pacific Northwest Research Institute	2000
Heidi Hamm	Vanderbilt University	2025
Gregory Hannon (died 2026)	University of Cambridge	2012
J. Wade Harper	Harvard Medical School	2023
William F. Harrington (died 1992)	Johns Hopkins University School of Medicine	1976
F. Ulrich Hartl	Max Planck Institute of Biochemistry	2011
Felix Haurowitz (died 1987)	Indiana University	1975
Ari Helenius	ETH Zurich	2009
Richard Henderson	Medical Research Council	1998
Wayne Hendrickson	Columbia University	1993
Leon A. Heppel (died 2010)	Cornell University	1970
Dan Herschlag	Stanford University	2018
Avram Hershko	Technion Israel Institute of Technology	2003
George Hess (died 2015)	Cornell University	1987
Robert L. Hill (died 2012)	Duke University	1975
Mahlon Hoagland (died 2009)	Worcester Foundation for Biomedical Research	1984
Klaus Hofmann (died 1995)	University of Pittsburgh	1963
B. L. Horecker (died 2010)	Cornell University	1961
Arthur Horwich	Yale University	2003
Robert Huber	Max Planck Institute for Biochemistry	1995
Jerard Hurwitz (died 2019)	Memorial Sloan-Kettering Cancer Center	1974
Clyde A. Hutchison III (died 2025)	J. Craig Venter Institute	1995
Masayori Inouye	Rutgers University	2019
William Jencks (died 2007)	Brandeis University	1971
Mary Ellen Jones (died 1996)	University of North Carolina, School of Medicine	1984
Leemor Joshua-Tor	Cold Spring Harbor Laboratory	2017
Gerald Joyce	Salk Institute for Biological Studies	2001
Elvin Kabat (died 2000)	Columbia University College of Physicians and Surgeons	1966
James Kadonaga	University of California, San Diego	2022
Paul Kaesberg (died 2010)	University of Wisconsin–Madison	1991
Herman Kalckar (died 1991)	Harvard University	1959
Martin Kamen (died 2002)	University of California, San Diego	1962
Nathan Kaplan (died 1986)	University of California, San Diego	1970
Seymour Kaufman (died 2009)	National Institutes of Health	1986
Thomas J. Kelly	Johns Hopkins University	1992
John Kendrew (died 1997)	University of Oxford	1972
Eugene P. Kennedy (died 2011)	Harvard University	1964
Har Gobind Khorana (died 2011)	Massachusetts Institute of Technology	1966
Peter Kim	Stanford University	1997
V. Narry Kim	Seoul National University	2014
Robert Kingston	Harvard University	2016
Rachel Klevit	University of Washington	2021
Judith Klinman	University of California, Berkeley	1994
Irving Klotz (died 2005)	Northwestern University	1970
Jeremy Knowles (died 2008)	Harvard University	1988
Edward Korn	National Institutes of Health	1990
Arthur Kornberg (died 2007)	Stanford University	1957
Roger Kornberg	Stanford University	1993
Alberto Kornblihtt	University of Buenos Aires	2011
Daniel E. Koshland, Jr. (died 2007)	University of California, Berkeley	1966
Stephen Kowalczykowski	University of California, Davis	2007
Adrian Krainer	Cold Spring Harbor Laboratory	2020
Lester O. Krampitz (died 1993)	Case Western Reserve University	1978
Joseph Kraut (died 2012)	University of California, San Diego	1988
Thomas A. Kunkel	National Institute of Environmental Health Sciences	2024
Alan Lambowitz	University of Texas at Austin	2004
Rebecca Lancefield (died 1981)	Rockefeller University	1970
Arthur Landy	Brown University	1999
M. Daniel Lane (died 2014)	Johns Hopkins University	1987
Henry Lardy (died 2010)	University of Wisconsin–Madison	1958
I. Robert Lehman (died 2026)	Stanford University	1977
Albert Lehninger (died 1986)	Johns Hopkins University School of Medicine	1956
Luis F. Leloir (died 1987)	Instituto de Investigaciones Bioquimicas of Argentina	1960
William Lennarz (died 2021)	State University of New York at Stony Brook	1989
Choh Hao Li (died 1987)	University of California, San Francisco	1973
Christopher D. Lima	Memorial Sloan Kettering Cancer Center	2020
Tomas Lindahl	Francis Crick Institute	2018
Fritz Lipmann (died 1986)	Rockefeller University	1950
Laszlo Lorand (died 2018)	Northwestern University	1987
George Lorimer	University of Maryland, College Park	1997
Martha Ludwig (died 2006)	University of Michigan	2003
Feodor Lynen (died 1979)	Max Planck Institute of Biochemistry	1962
James Manley	Columbia University	2011
Matthias Mann	Max Planck Institute of Biochemistry	2025
Lynne E. Maquat	University of Rochester	2011
Emanuel Margoliash (died 2008)	Northwestern University	1975
Michael Marletta	University of California, Berkeley	2006
Vincent Massey (died 2002)	University of Michigan School of Medicine	1995
Rowena Green Matthews	University of Michigan	2002
William D. McElroy (died 1999)	University of California, San Diego	1963
Alton Meister (died 1995)	Cornell University	1969
Robert Bruce Merrifield (died 2006)	Rockefeller University	1972
Karl Meyer (died 1990)	Columbia University	1967
Stanley Miller (died 2007)	University of California, San Diego	1973
Peter D. Mitchell (died 1992)	Glynn Research Institute	1977
Kiyoshi Mizuuchi	National Institutes of Health	1994
Paul Modrich	Duke University	1993
Tom Muir	Princeton University	2024
Geeta Narlikar	University of California, San Francisco	2021
Daniel Nathans (died 1999)	Johns Hopkins University School of Medicine	1979
Elizabeth Neufeld	University of California, Los Angeles	1977
Hans Neurath (died 2002)	University of Washington	1961
Marshall Warren Nirenberg (died 2010)	National Institutes of Health	1967
Yasutomi Nishizuka (died 2004)	Kobe University	1988
Harry Noller	University of California, Santa Cruz	1992
Masayasu Nomura (died 2011)	University of California, Irvine	1978
John Northrop (died 1987)	University of California, Berkeley	1934
Peter Novick	University of California, San Diego	2013
Jodi Nunnari	Altos Labs	2017
Michael E. O'Donnell	The Rockefeller University	2006
Erin O'Shea	Howard Hughes Medical Institute	2004
Severo Ochoa (died 1993)	Autonomous University of Madrid	1957
Leslie Orgel (died 2007)	Salk Institute for Biological Studies	1990
Roy R. Parker	University of Colorado Boulder	2012
Armando Parodi	Fundacion Instituto Leloir	2000
Dinshaw Patel	Memorial Sloan Kettering Cancer Center	2009
Nikola Pavletich	Memorial Sloan Kettering Cancer Center	2012
David Phillips (died 1999)	University of Oxford	1985
Frank W. Putnam (died 2006)	Indiana University	1976
Jesse C. Rabinowitz (died 2003)	University of California, Berkeley	1981
Efraim Racker (died 1991)	Cornell University	1966
Charles M. Radding (died 2020)	Yale University	1995
Rafael Radi	Universidad de la Republica	2015
Christian R. H. Raetz (died 2011)	Duke University Medical Center	2006
Venkatraman Ramakrishnan	Medical Research Council	2004
Tom A. Rapoport	Harvard Medical School	2005
Sarah Ratner (died 1999)	Public Health Research Institute	1974
Lester J. Reed (died 2015)	University of Texas at Austin	1973
Peter A. Reichard (died 2018)	Karolinska Institute	1980
Danny Reinberg	University of Miami	2015
Alexander Rich (died 2015)	Massachusetts Institute of Technology	1970
Charles C. Richardson	Harvard Medical School	1983
Donald C. Rio	University of California, Berkeley	2023
David Rittenberg (died 1970)	Columbia University	1953
Phillips W. Robbins	Boston Medical Center	1982
Carol Vivien Robinson	University of Oxford	2017
Marina Rodnina	Max Planck Institute for Multidisciplinary Sciences	2022
Irwin A. Rose (died 2015)	University of California, Irvine	1979
William C. Rose (died 1985)	University of Illinois Urbana-Champaign	1936
Saul Roseman (died 2011)	Johns Hopkins University	1972
Michael K. Rosen	University of Texas Southwestern Medical Center	2020
Ora M. Rosen (died 1990)	Memorial Sloan Kettering Cancer Center	1989
William J. Rutter (died 2025)	Synergenics, LLC	1984
Bengt Samuelsson (died 2024)	Karolinska Institute	1984
Anthony San Pietro (died 2008)	Indiana University	1983
Aziz Sancar	University of North Carolina at Chapel Hill	2005
Frederick Sanger (died 2013)	Medical Research Council	1967
Robert T. Sauer	Massachusetts Institute of Technology	1996
Howard K. Schachman (died 2016)	University of California, Berkeley	1968
Gottfried Schatz (died 2015)	University of Basel	1989
Robert T. Schimke (died 2014)	Stanford University	1976
Paul R. Schimmel	Scripps Research Institute	1990
Vern L. Schramm	Albert Einstein College of Medicine	2007
Brenda A. Schulman	Max Planck Institute of Biochemistry	2014
Shu-ou Shan	California Institute of Technology	2025
David Shemin (died 1991)	Marine Biological Laboratory	1958
Yigong Shi	Westlake University	2013
Kevan M. Shokat	University of California, San Francisco	2009
Paul B. Sigler (died 2000)	Yale University	1992
Maxine F. Singer (died 2024)	Carnegie Institution of Washington	1979
Robert L. Sinsheimer (died 2017)	University of California, Santa Barbara	1967
Emil L. Smith (died 2009)	University of California, Los Angeles	1962
Hamilton O. Smith (died 2025)	J. Craig Venter Institute	1980
Michael Smith (died 2000)	University of British Columbia	1996
Esmond E. Snell (died 2003)	University of Texas at Austin	1955
Dieter Söll	Yale University	1997
Nahum Sonenberg	McGill University	2015
Alexander Spirin (died 2020)	Russian Academy of Sciences	2019
David B. Sprinson (died 2007)	Columbia University	1990
Earl Reece Stadtman (died 2008)	National Institutes of Health	1969
Thressa C. Stadtman (died 2016)	National Institutes of Health	1981
Wendell Stanley (died 1971)	University of California, Berkeley	1941
George R. Stark	Cleveland Clinic Foundation	1987
Donald F. Steiner (died 2014)	University of Chicago	1975
Joan A. Steitz	Yale University	1983
Thomas A. Steitz (died 2018)	Yale University	1990
Audrey Stevens Niyogi (died 2010)	Oak Ridge National Laboratory	1998
Bruce Stillman	Cold Spring Harbor Laboratory	2000
JoAnne Stubbe	Massachusetts Institute of Technology	1992
Julian M. Sturtevant (died 2005)	Yale University	1973
Wesley I. Sundquist	University of Utah	2014
Albert Szent-Györgyi (died 1986)	Marine Biological Laboratory	1956
Jack Szostak	University of Chicago	1998
Herbert Tabor (died 2020)	National Institutes of Health	1977
Paul Talalay (died 2019)	Johns Hopkins University	1987
Susan S. Taylor	University of California, San Diego	1996
Jeremy W. Thorner	University of California, Berkeley	2015
Alice Ting	Stanford University	2023
Glauco Tocchini-Valentini	National Research Council of Italy	2009
Sidney Udenfriend (died 1999)	Drew University	1971
Olke C. Uhlenbeck	Northwestern University	1993
Harold Edwin Umbarger (died 1999)	Purdue University	1976
P. Roy Vagelos	No Affiliation	1972
Bert Vallee (died 2010)	Harvard University	1974
Wilfred van der Donk	University of Illinois Urbana-Champaign	2021
Alexander Varshavsky	California Institute of Technology	1995
Victor C. Vaughan (died 1929)	University of Michigan	1915
Sidney F. Velick (died 2007)	University of Utah	1981
Jerome Vinograd (died 1976)	California Institute of Technology	1968
Peter von Hippel	University of Oregon	1978
Salih J. Wakil (died 2019)	Baylor College of Medicine	1990
George Wald (died 1997)	Harvard University	1950
Suzanne Walker	Harvard Medical School	2020
Christopher T. Walsh (died 2023)	Harvard University	1989
Peter Walter	University of California, San Francisco	2004
James C. Wang	Harvard University	1986
Gregorio Weber (died 1997)	University of Illinois Urbana-Champaign	1975
Sidney Weinhouse (died 2001)	Thomas Jefferson University Medical College	1979
Herbert Weissbach	Florida Atlantic University	1982
Jonathan S. Weissman	Whitehead Institute	2009
James A. Wells	University of California, San Francisco	1999
Stephen C. West	Francis Crick Institute	2016
Abraham White (died 1980)	Albert Einstein College of Medicine	1970
Sue Hengren Wickner	National Institutes of Health	2004
William T. Wickner	Dartmouth College	1996
Robley Williams (died 1995)	University of California, Berkeley	1955
Roger J. Williams (died 1988)	University of Texas at Austin	1946
Oskar Wintersteiner (died 1971)	Squibb Institute of Medical Research	1950
George Wislocki (died 1956)	Harvard Medical School	1941
Richard Wolfenden (died 2025)	University of North Carolina at Chapel Hill	2002
Sandra Wolin	National Cancer Institute	2024
Harland Wood (died 1991)	Case Western Reserve University	1953
Dilworth Wayne Woolley (died 1966)	Rockefeller Institute for Medical Research	1952
Carl Wu	Johns Hopkins University	2006
Jeffries Wyman (died 1995)	Harvard University	1969
Wei Yang	National Institutes of Health	2013
Paul C. Zamecnik (died 2009)	Harvard University	1968
