= Conway =

Conway may refer to:

== Places ==
=== United States ===
- Conway, Arkansas
- Conway County, Arkansas
- Lake Conway, Arkansas
- Conway, Florida
- Conway, Iowa
- Conway, Kansas
- Conway, Louisiana
- Conway, Massachusetts
- Conway, Michigan
- Conway Township, Michigan
- Conway, Missouri
- Conway, New Hampshire, a New England town
  - Conway (CDP), New Hampshire, village in the town
- Conway, North Dakota
- Conway, North Carolina
- Conway, Pennsylvania
- Conway, South Carolina
- Conway River (Virginia)
- Conway, Washington

=== Elsewhere ===
- Conway, Queensland, a locality in the Whitsunday Region, Queensland, Australia
- Conway River (New Zealand)
- Conway, Wales, now spelt Conwy, a town with a castle in North Wales
- River Conway, Wales, similarly respelt River Conwy

== Ships ==
- HMS Conway (school ship)
- HMS Conway (1832), a 26-gun sixth rate launched in 1832
- USS Conway (DD-70) or USS Craven (DD-70), a Caldwell class destroyer launched in 1918
- USS Conway (DD-507), a Fletcher-class destroyer launched in 1942

== Other uses ==
- Conway (given name)
- Conway (surname)
- Conway Cabal, a 1777–78 conspiracy
- Conway Publishing
- Conway Recording Studios, California, US
- Conway Yard, rail yard in Pennsylvania, US
- FM Conway, British engineering company
- Rolls-Royce Conway, the first turbofan aircraft engine to enter service
- Conway, a retail chain operated by National Stores
- FV 4004 Conway, a variant of the Centurion tank
- Conway's Game of Life, a two-dimensional cellular automaton
  - John Horton Conway, creator of Conway's Game of Life
- Conway the Machine, American rapper

== See also ==
- Conway High School (disambiguation)
- Conway National Park, Australia
- Conway Reef, an outlying coral reef in Fiji
- Conway Hall, the London home since 1929 of the Conway Hall Ethical Society, the oldest surviving free-thought association in Britain
- Conway Scenic Railroad, a heritage railroad in New Hampshire
- Conway Summit, a mountain pass in California
- Conway Lake, New Hampshire
- Conwy (disambiguation)
- Con-way, a freight transportation and logistics company based in Ann Arbor, MI (formerly based in California)
- Conway's Law
- Cornway College, commonly misspelt as Conway, in Mt Hampden, Zimbabwe.
- Conway School of Nursing, the nursing school at Catholic University, Washington D.C., USA.
- Conaway (disambiguation)
- Devon Conway, a South Africa-born cricketer who plays for New Zealand
