= Agouron =

Agouron may refer to:

- Agouron Institute, a non-profit research organization that sponsors research in biology
- Agouron Pharmaceuticals, a subsidiary of Pfizer
