= Marion Sewer =

American pharmacologist

- Born: October 28, 1972
- Died: January 28, 2016 (aged 43); Detroit, Michigan
- Education: Spelman College, BS in biochemistry (1993); Emory University, PhD in pharmacology; Vanderbilt University, postdoctoral fellow
- Known for: steroid hormone biosynthesis, lipid metabolism
- Scientific career
- Fields: biochemistry, pharmacology, chemistry
- Workplaces: University of California, San Diego (2009-2016), Georgia Institute of Technology (2002-2008)
- Doctoral advisor: Edward Morgan
- Other academic advisors: Michael Waterman

Marion Sewer (October 28, 1972 – January 28, 2016) was a pharmacologist and professor at the University of California, San Diego's Skaggs School of Pharmacy and Pharmaceutical Sciences known for her research on steroid hormone biogenesis and her commitment to increasing diversity in science. Much of her research centered around cytochrome P450, a family of enzymes involved in the conversion of cholesterol into steroid hormones. She died unexpectedly at the age of 43 from a pulmonary embolism on January 28, 2016, while traveling through the Detroit airport.

== Early life and education ==
Sewer was born in St. Thomas, Virgin Islands on October 28, 1972. She was raised in Saint John, U.S. Virgin Islands. In 1993, she received a bachelor's of science in biochemistry from Spelman College where she participated in research as a Minority Access to Research Careers (MARC) scholar.

She went on to earn a PhD in pharmacology from Emory University, for research into the regulation of cytochrome P450 expression and activity in the liver and kidneys in the laboratory of Edward Morgan. This work was supported by a predoctoral fellowship from the Howard Hughes Medical Institute. She then pursued further training as a postdoctoral fellow at Vanderbilt University in the laboratory of Michael R. Waterman, where she studied transcriptional regulation of P450 enzymes with support from a UNCF/Merck Postdoctoral Scholarship.

== Career ==
I have found that biomedical research, particularly in academia, can be isolating, and at times fraught with setbacks and disappointment. In spite of these adversities I think the most important thing that I’ve learned is to not let speed bumps deter you from your goals and to not be afraid to take detours off a set path if these changes move you closer a personally satisfying career.

— Marion Sewer

Sewer joined the faculty of the Georgia Institute of Technology in 2002, where she studied how cytochrome P450 enzymes regulate the production of steroid hormones. She received tenure in 2008 before moving to the University of California, San Diego (UCSD) in 2009, where she rose to the rank of full professor in 2015. In addition to teaching pharmacology, she led a lab at the Skaggs School of Pharmacy and Pharmaceutical Sciences researching how lipid metabolism is regulated and how this affects cells.

She discovered that nuclear receptors are targets for a type of lipids called sphingolipids and that specific sphingolipids and phospholipids could act as endogenous (natural) ligands (binding partners) for an important regulator of steroid hormone biosynthesis called steroidogenic factor 1 (SF-1). This showed that nuclear lipids could play a previously unknown role in regulating gene expression.

Sewer was very active in the scientific community; she was a member of the editorial boards of Molecular Endocrinology and Steroids and served on numerous committees, including the Mentoring Committee of Women in Endocrinology, the Publications Committee of the Endocrine Society, and the Minority Affairs Committees of the Endocrine Society and the American Society for Biochemistry and Molecular Biology (ASBMB). She co-founded and helped lead grant writing workshops and a mentorship program through the ASBMB to help advance the careers of underrepresented minority scientists.

Her leadership roles included serving as Deputy Chair for the ASBMB Minority Affairs Committee (MAC) and associate director at UCSD's Institutional Research and Academic Career Development Award (IRACDA) program, which supports underrepresented minority postdoctoral fellows. She also served on NIH study sections on Training and Workforce development and Molecular and Cellular Endocrinology and was secretary/treasurer of the American Society for Pharmacology and Experimental Therapeutics (ASPET)'s Drug Metabolism Division.

== Honors and awards ==
- Undergraduate Minority Access to Research Careers Scholarship, 1991-1993
- Howard Hughes Medical Institute Predoctoral Fellowship, 1993-1998
- UNCF/Merck Postdoctoral Fellowship, 1998-2000
- American Society for Biochemistry and Molecular Biology Travel Award, 2000
- Georgia Cancer Coalition Distinguished Scientist Award, 2002
- National Science Foundation Career Development Award, 2004
- Emory University Graduate School of Arts and Sciences Distinguished Alumnus Award, 2013

The American Society for Biochemistry and Molecular Biology (ASBMB) established The Marion B. Sewer Distinguished Scholarship for Undergraduates in her honor to financially support undergraduate biochemistry and molecular biology students committed to increasing diversity in science.

== Selected publications ==
- "Diversity and Inclusion Matters: Where do we go from here?". www.asbmb.org.
- "Minority Affairs: Overcoming impostor syndrome". www.asbmb.org.
- Urs, Aarti N.; Dammer, Eric; Kelly, Samuel; Wang, Elaine; Merrill, Alfred H.; Sewer, Marion B. (February 2007). "Steroidogenic factor-1 is a sphingolipid binding protein". Molecular and Cellular Endocrinology. 265–266: 174–178. doi:10.1016/j.mce.2006.12.016. ISSN 0303-7207. PMC 1850975. PMID 17196738.
- Sewer, Marion B.; Waterman, Michael R. (2003-03-07). "cAMP-dependent Protein Kinase Enhances CYP17 Transcription via MKP-1 Activation in H295R Human Adrenocortical Cells". Journal of Biological Chemistry. 278 (10): 8106–8111. doi:10.1074/jbc.M210264200. ISSN 0021-9258. PMID 12506119.
- Sewer, Marion B.; Nguyen, Viet Q.; Huang, Ching-Jung; Tucker, Philip W.; Kagawa, Norio; Waterman, Michael R. (April 2002). "Transcriptional Activation of Human CYP17 in H295R Adrenocortical Cells Depends on Complex Formation among p54nrb/NonO, Protein-Associated Splicing Factor, and SF-1, a Complex That Also Participates in Repression of Transcription". Endocrinology. 143 (4): 1280–1290. doi:10.1210/endo.143.4.8748. ISSN 0013-7227. PMID 11897684.
