= JLR =

JLR may refer to

== Places ==
- Jabalpur Airport (IATA airport code: JLR, ICAO airport code: VAJB), in India
- Jetalsar railway station (rail code: JLR), in India

== Publications ==
- Journal of Language Relationship
- Journal of Law and Religion
- Journal of Lipid Research
- University of Michigan Journal of Law Reform

== Companies ==
- Jaguar Land Rover, a British automobile-manufacturer
