= Henry Conway =

Henry Conway may refer to:

- Sir Henry Conway, 1st Baronet (1630–1669), MP for Flintshire, of the Conway Baronets
- Henry Seymour Conway (1721–1795), British general and statesman
- Henry W. Conway (1793–1827), delegate from the Arkansas Territory to the United States House of Representatives
- Henry Conway (socialite) (born 1983), London-based socialite, club promoter and fashion journalist

== See also ==
- Henry Conway Belfield (1855–1923), British Resident in three Malay states and former Governor of Kenya
- Lord Henry Seymour-Conway (1746–1830), former British and Irish MP
- Harry Conway (born 1992), Australian cricketer
- Conway (disambiguation)
