= Earl Reece Stadtman =

American biochemist

Earl Stadtman
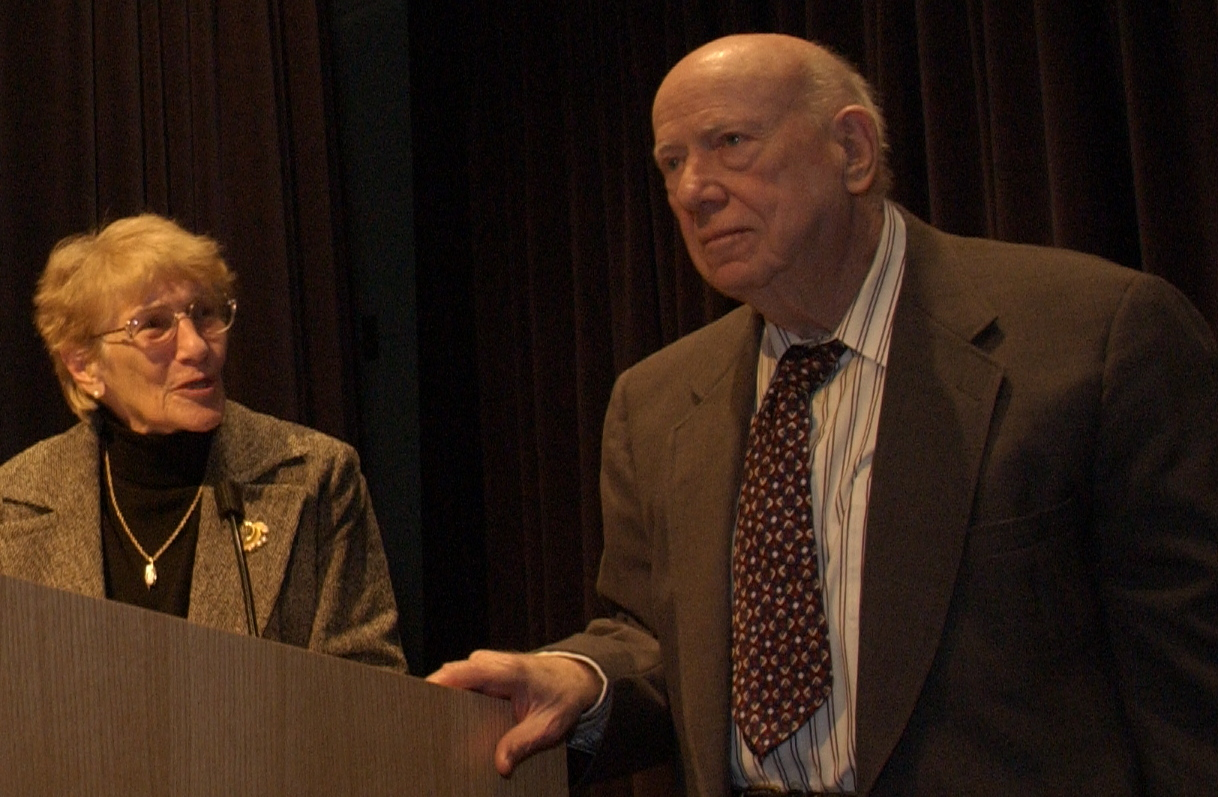
- Earl Reece and Thressa Stadtman, 2004
- Born: Earl Reece Stadtman; November 15, 1919; Carrizozo, New Mexico, USA
- Died: January 7, 2008 (aged 88); Derwood, Maryland, USA
- Education: University of California, Berkeley (Ph.D. 1949)
- Known for: Fatty aid biosynthesis, glutamine dehydrogenase, cycles of interconvertible enzymes
- Spouse: Thressa Campbell Stadtman
- Children: None
- Awards: Pfizer Award in Enzyme Chemistry, American Academy of Arts and Sciences, National Academy of Sciences, National Medal of Science, many others
- Scientific career
- Fields: Biochemistry
- Institutions: Georgetown University, Washington, DC; University of Maryland, College Park, Maryland; Johns Hopkins University; National Heart Institute, Bethesda, Maryland; many visiting appointments
- Thesis: Mechanisms of Fatty Acid Synthesis by Clostridium kluyveri
- Academic advisors: Horace Barker

Earl Reece Stadtman NAS (November 15, 1919 – January 7, 2008) was an American biochemist, notable for his research on enzymes and anaerobic bacteria.

== Career ==
Stadtman started his career as a research assistant in the Division of Plant Nutrition of the University of California. Subsequently, he was an Atomic Energy Commission Fellow with Fritz Lipmann in the Massachusetts General Hospital, but after 1960 he worked at the National Heart Institute, where he became chief of the Laboratory of Biochemistry. In addition, he spent sabbatical periods at the Max Planck Institute in Munich and the Pasteur Institute in Paris.

== Personal life ==
In 1944 Earl Stadtman married Thressa Campbell, also a distinguished scientist, the discoverer of selenocysteine. They had no children during their marriage of more than sixty years.

== Research ==
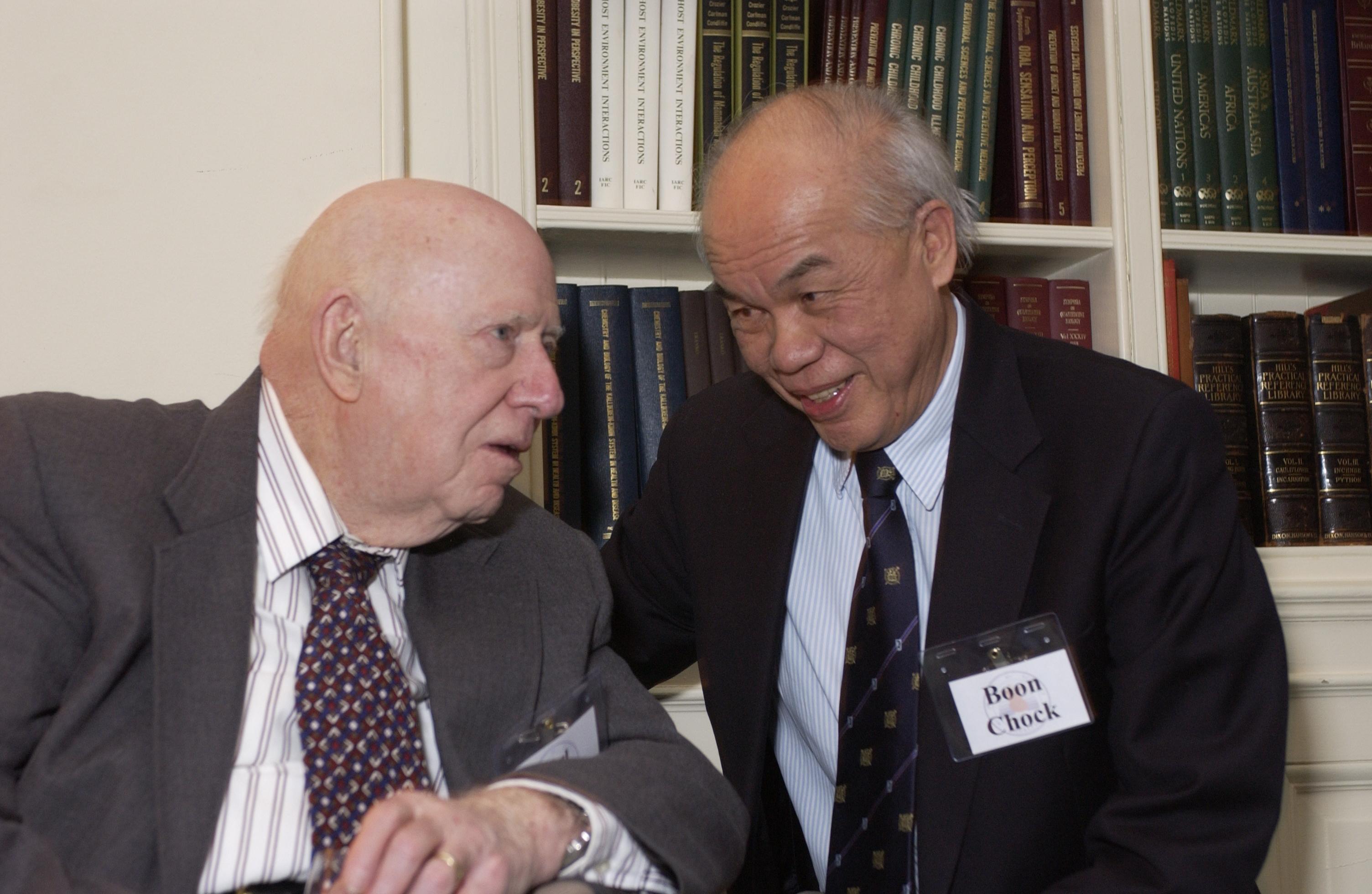
Earl Stadtman with P. Boon Chock

Stadtman's research covered a wide field. Early in his career he worked with Horace Barker on bacterial fatty-acid synthesis, with a series of four papers. In the same period he collaborated with Fritz Lipmann on the function of coenzyme A. Later his work took on a more enzymological character, with investigation of, for example, aldehyde dehydrogenase, aspartate kinase, work carried out during a period in the laboratory of Georges Cohen in France and, most notably, glutamine synthetase, an enzyme that will always be associated with his name.

From the 1970s onwards Stadtman published many papers with P. Boon Chock on the capacity of cycles of interconvertible enzymes, based especially on his results with glutamine synthetase, to generate very high sensitivity to effectors.

== Editorial work ==
Stadtman was active as an editor of numerous prominent journals, including the Journal of Biological Chemistry, 1960–1965, Archives of Biochemistry and Biophysics, 1960–1969; Annual Review of Biochemistry, 1972–2000; Biochemistry, 1969–1976; Proceedings of the National Academy of Sciences, 1974–1981; Trends in Biochemical Sciences, 1975–1978.

He was (with Bernard Horecker) founding editor of Current Topics in Cellular Regulation, a major series in the subject, and continued in the role up to volume 23 (1984).

== Awards and honours ==
- 1953: Pfizer Award in Enzyme Chemistry
- 1966: Medallion of the University of Pisa, Italy
- 1969: elected to the American Academy of Arts and Sciences
- 1969: elected to the National Academy of Sciences
- 1970: awarded Selman A. Waksman Award in Microbiology
- 1972: Medallion of the University of Camerino, Italy
- 1979: National Medal of Science
- 1983: President, American Society of Biological Chemists
- 1983: ASBC-Merck Award
- 1987: Honorary Doctor of Science, University of Michigan
- 1988: Honorary Ph.D., Weizmann Institute of Science, Israel
- 1991: Welch Award in Chemistry
- 1999: Honorary Ph.D., University of Pennsylvania
