= Christine Guthrie =

American geneticist (1945–2022)

- Born: April 27, 1945; Brooklyn, New York, U.S.
- Died: July 1, 2022 (aged 77)
- Education: University of Michigan (B.S.); University of Wisconsin (Ph.D.)
- Known for: Genetics of yeast
- Spouse: John Abelson
- Awards: Genetics Society of America Medal
- Scientific career
- Fields: Genetics
- Workplaces: University of California, San Francisco
- Doctoral advisor: Masayasu Nomura

Christine Guthrie (April 27, 1945 – July 1, 2022) was an American yeast geneticist and American Cancer Society Research Professor of Genetics at University of California San Francisco. She showed that yeast have small nuclear RNAs (snRNAs) involved in splicing pre-messenger RNA into messenger RNA in eukaryotic cells. Guthrie cloned and sequenced the genes for yeast snRNA and established the role of base pairing between the snRNAs and their target sequences at each step in the removal of an intron. She also identified proteins that formed part of the spliceosome complex with the snRNAs. Elected to the National Academy of Sciences in 1993, Guthrie edited Guide to Yeast Genetics and Molecular Biology, an influential methods series for many years.

== Early life and education ==
Christine Guthrie was born in Brooklyn, New York in 1945. She received a BS in Zoology from University of Michigan in 1966, and a PhD in genetics from University of Wisconsin in 1970 Her PhD advisor was Masayasu Nomura.

She was the daughter of Brooklyn native and humorist Irene Kampen, whose book, Life Without George, was the basis for The Lucy Show, which aired for six seasons on CBS in the 1960s. (Lucy's daughter on the show was named Chris.)

== Academic career ==
In 1973, she was hired as an assistant professor at University of California, San Francisco (UCSF). She was the first woman to join the UCSF Department of Biochemistry and Biophysics faculty. After a tough pre-tenure review in 1976, she found support in a group of women and men who met informally for 20 years to help each other thrive in academia as detailed in the book, "Every other Thursday". She supported students and postdocs to take non-traditional paths and fight the dictum that 'girls can't do biochemistry'. She was a professor of biochemistry and American Cancer Society Research Professor of Genetics at UCSF.

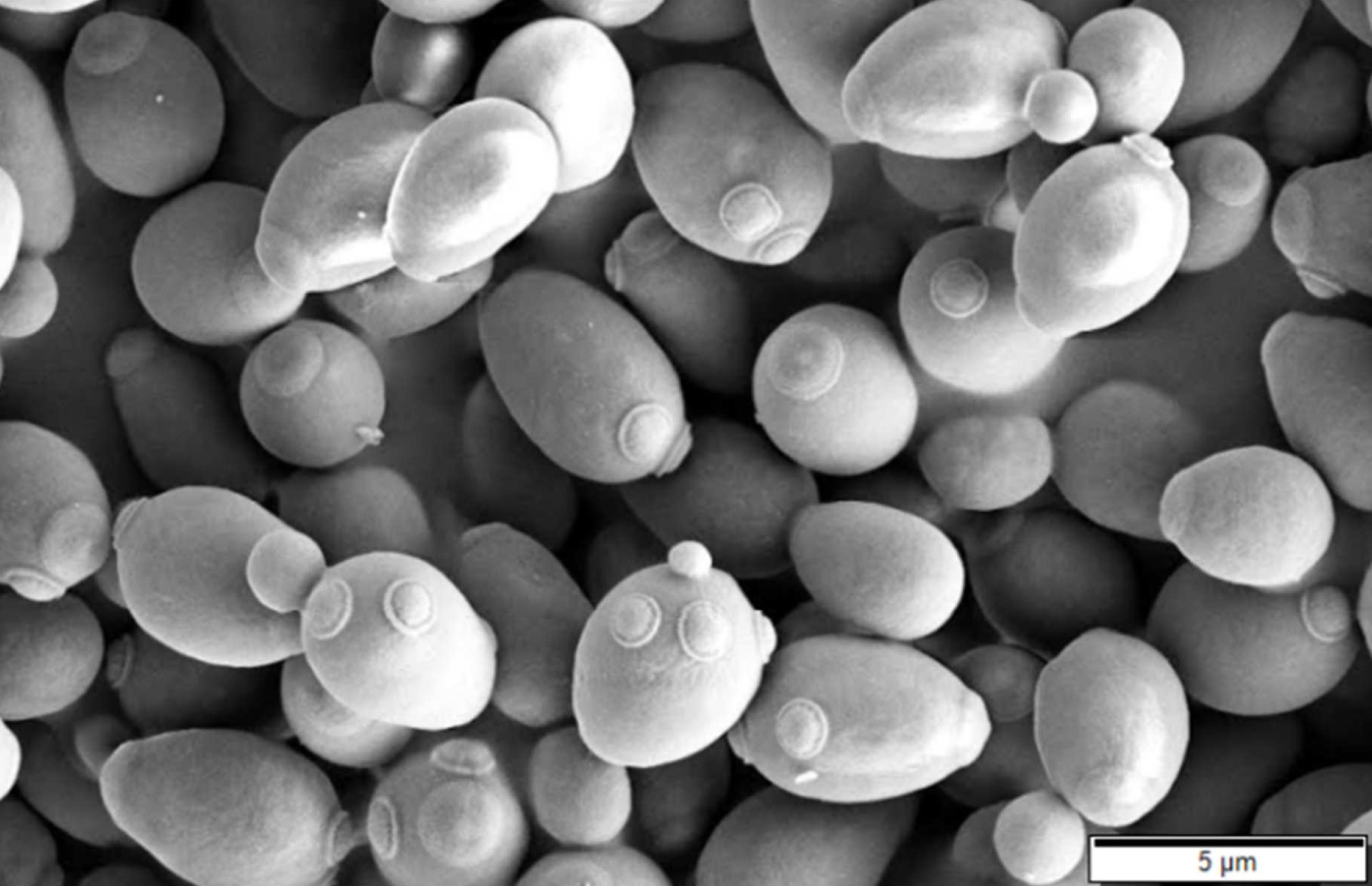
Scanning Electron Micrograph of Yeast, Saccharomyces cerevisiae

== Research ==
Guthrie showed that yeast have introns in their pre-messenger RNAs. They also have small nuclear RNAs (snRNAs) involved in splicing pre-messenger RNA into messenger RNA in eukaryotic cells. In work described in her citation for the Genetics Society of America Medal as a "macromolecular tour de force", she cloned and sequenced the SNR genes for the yeast snRNAs. To accomplish this feat, she invented methods to discriminate functional snRNAs from degradation products. She devised widely used intron-containing reporter genes. Her work established the role of base pairing between the snRNAs and their target sequences at each step in the removal of an intron and allowed identification of proteins that formed part of the spliceosome complex with the snRNAs.

== Personal life ==
Guthrie was married to John Abelson, biochemist and geneticist.

Guthrie died on July 1, 2022 at the age of 77.

== Awards ==
- 1993 National Academy of Sciences
- 1997 Genetics Society of America Medal
- 1998 WICB Senior Career Recognition Award (American Society for Cell Biology)
- 2006 The RNA Society Lifetime Achievement Award
- 2011 American Society for Biochemistry and Molecular Biology-Merck Award

== Works ==
=== Selected scientific papers ===
- Brow D. A., Guthrie C., 1988 "Spliceosomal RNA U6 is remarkably conserved from yeast to mammals." Nature 334: 213–218.
- Guthrie C., 1991 "Messenger RNA splicing in yeast: clues to why the spliceosome is a ribonucleoprotein." Science 253: 157–163.
- Guthrie C., Patterson B., 1988 "Spliceosomal snRNAs." Annu. Rev. Genet. 22: 387–419.
- Lesser C. F., Guthrie C. 1993 "Mutations in U6 snRNA that alter splice site specificity: Implications for the active site." Science 262: 1982–1988.
- Madhani H. D., Guthrie C., 1994 "Dynamic RNA-RNA interactions in the spliceosome." Annu. Rev. Genet. 28: 1–26.
- Parker R., Siliciano P. G., Guthrie C., 1987 "Recognition of the TACTAAC box during mRNA splicing in yeast involves base pairing to the U2-like snRNA." Cell 49: 229–239.
- Schwer B., Guthrie C., 1991 "PRP16 is an RNA-dependent ATPase that interacts transiently with the spliceosome." Nature 349: 494–499.
- Siliciano P. G., Jones M. H., Guthrie C., 1987b "Saccharomyces cerevisiae has a U1-like small nuclear RNA with unexpected properties." Science 237: 1484–1487.

=== Selected books ===
- Christine Guthrie and Gerald R. Fink, editors. 2002 Guide to Yeast Genetics and Molecular and Cell Biology, Part A, B and C Methods in Enzymology volume 351 Academic Press.
- Jonathan Weisman, Christine Guthrie, and Gerald Fink editors, 2010. Guide to Yeast Genetics: Functional Genomics, Proteomics and other Systems Analysis. Methods in Enzymology volume 470 2nd edition Academic Press.
