= Michael O'Donnell =

Michael O'Donnell may refer to:

- Michael O'Donnell (physician) (1928–2019), British doctor, journalist, author, and broadcaster
- Michael O'Donnell (Kansas politician) (born 1985), American researcher, and lecturer
- Michael E. O'Donnell, American biochemist
- Michael O'Donnell (rugby league), New Zealand former professional rugby league footballer
- Michael A. O'Donnell, American writer and researcher
- Michael O'Donnell (Missouri politician), politician in Missouri
