= Roy Parker =

Roy Parker may refer to:

- Roy Parker (baseball) (1896–1954), American Major League Baseball pitcher
- Roy H. Parker (1890–1970), U.S. Army chaplain
- Roy R. Parker, biochemist
