= Ralph Dorfman =

- Born: Ralph Isadore Dorfman; June 30, 1911; Chicago, Illinois
- Died: November 19, 1985 (aged 74); Mountain View, California
- Education: University of Illinois, University of Chicago
- Known for: Combined oral contraceptive pill
- Relatives: Albert Dorfman (brother)
- Scientific career
- Fields: Biochemistry, pharmacology
- Institutions: Yale University, Worcester Foundation for Experimental Biology, Shrewsbury, Massachusetts; Syntex Research, Palo Alto, California; Stanford University

Ralph Isadore Dorfman (1911–1985) was a Jewish-American biochemist. His work on metabolism in pharmacology and the use of steroid hormones contributed to the development of the combined oral contraceptive pill.

Dorfman was born in Chicago, Illinois. He received his bachelor's degree from the University of Illinois and a doctorate from the University of Chicago. After teaching at several institutions, including Yale University, he became a director at the Worcester Foundation for Experimental Biology in Shrewsbury, Massachusetts, which, during his 13-year tenure there, "became an international center for bioassays and the study of the chemistry, biochemistry, and biology of steroid hormones."

While working at the Worcester Foundation, Dorfman was a research consultant to the Syntex Corporation, starting in 1950. There he helped to develop the first publicly available birth control pill. In 1964, Dorfman joined Syntex full-time, eventually serving as president of Syntex Research in Palo Alto, California from 1973 to 1976. Dorfman's research also focused on treatments for cancer and rheumatoid arthritis and originated the reproductive biology concept of anti-estrogens and anti-androgens.

Late in his career, Dorfman returned to academia serving as a visiting professor in the Department of Molecular Pharmacology at Stanford University, 1967–1973, and finally as a consulting professor until his death. In addition to his numerous papers, Dorfman was the author or editor of 14 books and founded the journal Steroids.

Dorfman died of complications of Parkinson's disease at El Camino Hospital in Mountain View, California, at the age of 74. His brother was Albert Dorfman, and his grandson is Barnaby Dorfman.
