= Irene Kampen =

American writer (1922–1998)

Irene Kampen (April 18, 1922, in Brooklyn, New York – February 1, 1998, in Oceanside, California) was an American newspaperwoman and writer who wrote several books about events in her life. Her first book, Life Without George (1961), was the basis for the television series The Lucy Show (1962–1968).

== Biography ==
Born Irene Trepel in Brooklyn, New York, and raised in Great Neck, New York, she graduated from Great Neck High School. Kampen attended the University of Wisconsin–Madison before becoming a copy girl at the newspaper, New York Journal American, in 1943. She soon married Owen Kampen, an active-duty World War II pilot with the United States Army Air Forces. She went on to work at several weekly newspapers, becoming a reporter for the Levittown Tribune when the family moved to Levittown, New York, in 1948.

In 1954, the Kampens moved to a new house in Ridgefield, Connecticut, and Irene soon divorced her husband after a fourteen-year marriage. While working at her father's flower shop in New York City, she wrote fiction stories. She also frequently contributed to the local newspaper, The Ridgefield Press, using the pseudonym, H. Loomis Fenstermacher.

Kampen's first book, Life Without George, was published by Doubleday in 1961 and was about her divorce. The book became the basis for The Lucy Show, a television series that ran from 1962 to 1968 and starred Lucille Ball, who had also experienced divorce, from Desi Arnaz, just a few months before Kampen's book was published. Producers re-wrote Ball's character, Lucille Carmichael, as a widow, but the show portrayed Vivian Vance's character, Vivian Bagley, as a divorcée.

Kampen's daughter, Christine Guthrie, was an eminent scientist who demonstrated the function of small RNAs.

Kampen lived in Connecticut until 1988, when she moved to California. She died February 1, 1998, of breast cancer at the age of 75.

== Select bibliography ==
Kampen's published books include:

- Life Without George (1961)
- We That Are Left (1963)
- Europe Without George (1965)
- Last Year At Sugarbush (1966)
- Here Comes The Bride, There Goes Mother (1967)
- Due to Lack of Interest, Tomorrow Has Been Canceled (1969)
- Are You Carrying Any Gold Or Living Relatives? (1970)
- Nobody Calls At This Hour Just To Say Hello (1975)
- Fear Without Childbirth (1978)
