= Donald Zilversmit =

Dutch-born American scientist

- Born: July 11, 1919; Hengelo, Netherlands
- Died: September 16, 2010 (aged 91); Canton, Massachusetts
- Education: University of California, Berkeley
- Known for: Study of diet, cardiovascular disease and atherogenesis
- Scientific career
- Fields: Nutritional biochemist
- Workplaces: Cornell University

Donald Berthold Zilversmit (July 11, 1919 – September 16, 2010) was a Dutch-born U.S. nutritional biochemist, researcher and educator. He spent much of his career at Cornell University as professor in the division of nutritional sciences.

Zilversmit was born in Hengelo, Netherlands, the son of Herman and Elizabeth (DeWinter) Zilversmit. He began studies at Utrecht University but escaped before the German invasion in World War II. He came to the United States in 1939 to finish his studies at the University of California, Berkeley (B.S., 1940, Ph.D. 1948). He joined a Dutch brigade during the war.

He married Kitty Fonteyn in 1945. She wrote of her time in hiding and their separation during the Nazi occupation in Yours Always, A Holocaust Love Story. They have three daughters.

He was on the faculty of the University of Tennessee Medical College from 1948 to 1966. He received a Career Investigator Award from the American Heart Association in 1959. Zilversmit joined the faculty of Cornell's Graduate School of Nutrition in 1966 and remained until retirement in 1990.

He was awarded an honorary degree from Utrecht University in 1980 and was elected to the National Academy of Sciences in 1989.

Zilversmit authored or co-authored over 300 publications and made major contributions to the understanding of the relationship between diet and cardiovascular disease. He greatly contributed to the understanding of atherogenesis, including basic mechanisms in lipid transport and exchange. He co-founded the Journal of Lipid Research.

He died on September 16, 2010, in Canton, Mass.
