= Heidi Hamm =

American pharmacologist

Heidi Elizabeth Hamm
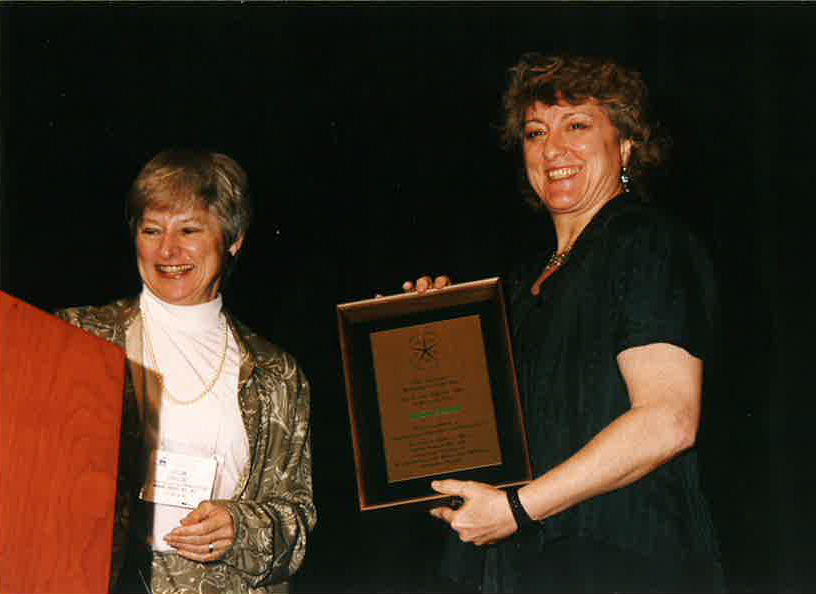
- Hamm (right) with Susan S. Taylor, inaugural fellows of the American Society for Biochemistry and Molecular Biology
- Born: August 26, 1950 (age 76)
- Education: University of Texas at Austin; Atlantic Union College; University of Florence
- Scientific career
- Workplaces: Northwestern University School of Medicine; University of Illinois Chicago; Indiana University Bloomington; University of Wisconsin–Madison; Vanderbilt University Medical Center
- Thesis: Circadian rhythms of melatonin synthesis in the avian retina (1980)

Heidi Elizabeth Hamm (born August 26, 1950) is an American pharmacologist who is a professor at the Vanderbilt University Medical Center. Her research looks to understand the molecular mechanisms that underpin G proteins. She was elected a Fellow of the American Association for the Advancement of Science in 2011 and the National Academy of Sciences in 2025.

== Early life and education ==
Hamm was born in Loma Linda, California. She studied modern languages at Atlantic Union College, and spent a year in Italy learning biology at the University of Florence. She returned to the United States in 1976, where she started a PhD at the University of Texas at Austin. Her doctoral research considered the avian retina. She explored the circadian rhythms of melatonin synthesis with Michael Menaker. She moved to the University of Wisconsin–Madison for postdoctoral research.

== Research and career ==
Hamm joined Indiana University Bloomington, where she spent a year as an assistant professor in visual science. She moved to the University of Illinois Chicago, where she was made an assistant professor in 1984, associate professor in 1990 and full professor in 1994. She was named the 1996 Illinois Faculty of the Year. In 1996, Hamm joined the Northwestern University School of Medicine, where she worked in the Department of Molecular Pharmacology and Biological Chemistry and Ophthalmology. She moved to Vanderbilt University in 2001. In 2000, she was made Head of Pharmacology.

Hamm investigates G proteins. Normally, these proteins are inactive, but can be activated by a signal and produce messengers (e.g. cyclic AMP). G protein-mediated signalling cascades underpin a broad range of processes, including cell division, and the mediation of neurotransmitter signalling. Hamm is interested in G protein activation, function and switch-off. By decomposing proteins into small synthetic peptides, and studying which block interaction sites, Hamm showed where interaction occurred on the proteins. She worked with Paul Sigler, using x-ray measurements to solve the crystal structure of active and inactive G proteins. G protein-coupled receptor (GPCRs) are targeted by more than half of drugs, and better understanding their activity open the door to new drugs for diverse diseases and disorders.

== Awards and honors ==
- 2006 Elected President of American Society for Biochemistry and Molecular Biology
- 2011 Elected Fellow American Association for the Advancement of Science
- 2012 Dutch Pharmacological Society Ariens Award
- 2015 American Society for Pharmacology and Experimental Therapeutics Robert R. Ruffolo Career Achievement Award
- 2025 Elected Fellow National Academy of Sciences

== Selected publications ==
- H. E. Hamm (9 January 1998). "The many faces of G protein signaling" (PDF). Journal of Biological Chemistry. 273 (2): 669–672. doi:10.1074/jbc.273.2.669. ISSN 0021-9258. PMID 9422713. Wikidata Q28608944.
- William M Oldham; Heidi E Hamm (1 January 2008). "Heterotrimeric G protein activation by G-protein-coupled receptors". Nature Reviews Molecular Cell Biology. 9 (1): 60–71. doi:10.1038/nrm2299. ISSN 1471-0072. PMID 18043707. Wikidata Q37017125.
- D G Lambright; J Sondek; A Bohm; N P Skiba; H E Hamm; P B Sigler (25 January 1996). "The 2.0 A crystal structure of a heterotrimeric G protein". Nature. 379 (6563): 311–9. doi:10.1038/379311a0. ISSN 1476-4687. PMID 8552184. Wikidata Q27732250.
