= Conaway =

Conaway is a surname. Notable people with the surname include:

- Asbury B. Conaway (1837–1897), justice of the Territorial Wyoming Supreme Court and of the Wyoming Supreme Court
- Charles Conaway, former Chief Executive Officer of Kmart and former President and Chief Operating Officer of CVS Corporation
- Cristi Conaway (born 1964), American actress and fashion designer
- Frank M. Conaway Jr. (born 1963), American politician
- Gertrude Conaway Vanderbilt (1901–1978), née Conaway, American socialite and philanthropist
- Herb Conaway (born 1963), American politician
- Jeff Conaway (1950–2011), American actor
- Joan W. Conaway, American biochemist
- John B. Conaway (born 1934), retired U.S. Air Force lieutenant general and Chief of the National Guard Bureau
- John W. Conaway (1843–1913), Union Army soldier awarded the Medal of Honor
- Mike Conaway (born 1948), American politician
