= Conwy (disambiguation) =

Conwy is a walled town and community in north Wales.

Conwy may also refer to these proximate things:

- Conwy (electoral ward), a county division coterminous with the town
- Conwy County Borough, a principal local government area (from 1996)
- the River Conwy (Afon Conwy)
- Conwy County Borough Council, a local authority
- Conwy Borough F.C. (formerly Conwy United), a part-time football club
- Conwy railway station, a train request stop

Defunct administrative areas:

- Conwy (UK Parliament constituency) (1950–2010)
- Conwy (National Assembly for Wales constituency) (1999–2007)
- Conwy (municipal borough) (1885–1974)

== See also ==
- Conway (disambiguation)
