= Roy R. Parker =

American biochemist

Roy Parker
- Born: Roy R. Parker
- Title: Member of the National Academy of Sciences
- Scientific career
- Education: Carnegie Mellon University (BSc); University of California, San Francisco (PhD)
- Known for: Distinguished Professor of Chemistry and Biochemistry; Cech-Leinwand Endowed Chair of Biochemistry at the University of Colorado Boulder
- Fields: Biochemistry; Chemistry
- Workplaces: University of Arizona; University of Colorado Boulder; University of California, San Francisco; University of California, San Diego; University of Massachusetts Medical School; Howard Hughes Medical Institute; National Academy of Sciences
- Website: www.colorado.edu/lab/parkergroup/

External videos
- Roy Parker, “Improving Graduate Training”, iBiology
- Roy Parker, “The Life of Eukaryotic mRNA: Localization, Translation, and Degradation”, iBiology

Roy R. Parker is a biochemist who has been an active investigator in science since the 1970s. He is currently a Distinguished Professor of Chemistry and Biochemistry and Cech-Leinwand Endowed Chair of Biochemistry at the University of Colorado Boulder. Throughout his life, Parker has contributed a vast degree of knowledge to research and studies of biochemistry. His current focus includes the biogenesis, function, and degradation of multiple forms of RNA in eukaryotes. Parker aims to use his research to understand how various diseases and pathologies result from abnormalities in RNA. In 2012, Parker was elected to the National Academy of Sciences in Biochemistry.

== Education ==
To start his career, Parker attended Carnegie Mellon University in Pittsburgh, Pennsylvania, where he received his Bachelor of Science degree in chemistry. After graduating from Carnegie Mellon in 1979, he moved on to receive his PhD in genetics with Christine Guthrie at the University of California, San Francisco, California in 1985. From 1985-1987, Parker worked in laboratories for his postdoctoral degree at both the University of California, San Francisco, and the University of California, San Diego. Later, Parker was a postdoctoral fellow with Allan Jacobson at the University of Massachusetts Medical School in Worcester, MA from 1988-89.

== Career ==
Parker began his laboratory at the University of Arizona in 1989, and was a professor molecular and cellular biology until 2012 when he moved to be a professor at the University of Colorado Boulder. He is currently the Cech-Leinwand Endowed Chair of Biochemistry as well as professor in chemistry and biochemistry courses. Parker is a Howard Hughes Medical Institute investigator (since 1994).

== Research interests ==
The primary investigations of Parker's research include the analysis of eukaryotic RNA and the effects that flawed types of RNA have on the biochemical mechanisms of the body. More technically, his lab addresses the regulation of RNA molecules, how that impacts normal physiology of eukaryotic cells, and how aberrant RNA regulation contributes to human disease. His lab uses yeast and mammalian cells to examine oligo(U) and oligo(A) tailing and detailing, tau protein in RNA biology and RNA chaperones.

=== Key conclusions ===
Important research findings first began when Parker and his lab team established the major pathways of eukaryotic mRNA turnover. These pathways have the potential to generate mRNA degradation and decapping. Next, the lab group pinpointed major nucleases that contribute to mRNA degradation, as well as the molecules that help facilitate this event. Some of these facilitators include decapping enzymes, 3' to 5' decay complexes, and deadenylases. In years following, Parker and co-workers collected enough data to conclude that some decapping and decay proteins are translational repressors. In other words, Parker determined that decapping and translation could be thought of as rivals, for their mechanisms oppose each other. Finally, most recently, the lab group has discovered several cytoplasmic mRNP granules most notably P bodies.

=== Major contributions ===
In addition to publishing hundreds of research articles in scientific journals, Parker has supported the education of students around the country. Some of his talks are published online. These focus on topics including improving graduate training and "The Life of Eukaryotic mRNA: Localization, Translation, and Degradation". These video lectures are published online to educate students and other scientists.

== Publications ==
Throughout his education and career, Parker has published 165 original papers and 77 chapters and invited reviews. Some of his most-cited publications and discoveries include the following:

“PEP4 Gene Function Is Required for Expression of Several Vacuolar Hydrolases in Saccharomyces Cerevisiae”(1982) Parker’s first original publication was in 1982 where he worked with two other scientists, Zubenko and Jones, to investigate the role of the PEP4 gene on yeast S. cerevisiae.

A Turnover Pathway for Both Stable and Unstable mRNAs in Yeast: Evidence for a Requirement for Deadenylation”(1993) The purpose of this investigation was to trace the pathways involved in mRNA turnover in yeast. To do so, Parker and Decker conducted experimentation in four genes by analyzing the degradation of nascent transcripts. They found a connection between both deadenylation rate of mRNA and stability of oligo(A) with mRNA half-lives. More specifically, they looked at the effects of RNA secondary structures and realized that after deadenylation, those without the 5’ sequence began to aggregate. After evaluating these results, they concluded that deadenylation contributes to changes in mRNA, creating an mRNA decay pathway.

“Degradation of mRNA in Eukaryotes”(1995) With this research study, Parker and Beelman investigated the various pathways of degradation to several subtypes of mRNA. They offer evidence that there is a connection between decay rate and turnover pathways of mRNA. After developing conclusions from much observation and research in this study, Parker and Beelman hoped to pinpoint the genetic products that control nucleolytic events and promote degradation pathways.

“mRNA Turnover in Yeast Promoted by the MATalpha1 Instability Element”(1996) In 1996, Parker and Caponigro analyzed the decay rates of mRNA in yeast by deleting a component of the MATalpha1 instability element and observing the effects.

“Recognition of Yeast mRNAs As “Nonsense Containing” Leads to Both Inhibition of mRNA Translation and mRNA Degradation: Implications for the Control of mRNA Decapping”(1999) This paper examined promoters for decapping and how the promoters impede the translation and destruction of mRNA.

“Decapping and Decay of Messenger RNA Occur in Cytoplasmic Processing Bodies”(2003) In 2003, Parker and Sheth concentrated on deadenylation, decapping, and exonucleolytic decay in this publication. They studied yeast models and proposed a model that P bodies are the sites of degradation in the cell and contain intermediates of mRNA degradation. With this information, they concluded that mRNAs move between polysomes and P bodies, and this is a critical aspect of mRNA metabolism in the cytoplasm.

“Cytoplasmic Degradation of Splice-Defective Pre-mRNAs and Intermediates”(2003) With this publication, Hilleren and Parker discovered that the buildup of certain intermediates in a Dbr1p-dependent pathway indicates that same pathway regulates pre-mRNA splicing.

“General Translational Repression by Activators of mRNA Decapping”(2005) Coller and Parker singled out activators for decapping mechanisms in this study. These decapping activators inhibit translation and stimulate the formation of P bodies. Using staining techniques to identify the activity of decapping activators, they were successfully able to conclude that there is a mechanism which signals mRNAs for decapping and therefore restricts mRNAs from going through translation.

“Movement of Eukaryotic mRNAs between Polysomes and Cytoplasmic Processing Bodies”(2005) Throughout this paper, Parker and two other scientists, Brengues and Teixeira, demonstrated that mRNAs migrate between polysomes and cytoplasmic processing bodies as a form of mRNA packing.

“Endonucleolytic Cleavage of Eukaryotic mRNAs with Stalls in Translation Elongation”(2006) Doma and Parker identified the process of non-stop decay by which special proteins are able to distinguish stalled mRNA translation, and then initiate the process of endonucleolytic cleavage.

“P Bodies and the Control of mRNA Translation and Degradation”(2007) This publication focuses on eukaryotes and the formation of P bodies due to aggregations of mRNAs that failed to undergo translation. P bodies are linked to maternal and neuronal mRNA granules. This link led to uncovering of the relationship between polysomes and mRNAs within P bodies with regards to cytoplasmic mRNA activity. Parker and Sheth’s prime conclusion from this publication is that translation is inhibited, and decay is promoted when mRNA-specific regulatory factors, such as miRNAs and RISC, engage with P bodies.

“Eukaryotic Stress Granules: The Ins and Outs of Translation”(2009) The focus of this publication is the formation of stress granules due to the body’s stress response which prevents translation from occurring. Parker and Buchan researched that stress granules cause many problems to forms of RNA, particularly mRNAs, by making them less stable and by preventing their translation. They were able to conclude that stress granules may communicate with P bodies to create even more harmful effects to the function of mRNA.

“Skill Development in Graduate Education”(2012) This unique paper does not discuss biochemical processes but rather explores the impacts of proper education in the field of biochemistry. Parker demonstrates the elevated dropout rates in students pursuing graduate degrees and analyzes the necessary steps taken and skills acquired for a student to succeed.

“Analysis of Double-Stranded RNA from Microbial Communities Identifies Double-Stranded RNA Virus-Like Elements”(2014) Decker and Parker suggested from this publication that investigating double-stranded RNAs could potentially lead to a multitude of discoveries about the genetics of viruses and other microbes.

“The Link between Adjacent Codon Pairs and mRNA Stability”(2017) In 2017, Harigaya and Parker found that there was a connection between the stability of mRNA and codon pairs that act to suppress certain functions in the codon-mediated gene regulation.

“Transcriptome-Wide Comparison of Stress Granules and P Bodies Reveals that Translation Plays a Major Role in RNA Partitioning”(2019) Matheny, Rao, and Parker collaborated to identify that translation is an extremely important process in the formation of P bodies and stress granules, which is often suppressed during stress.

== Honors and awards ==
Parker has received many honors and awards, including the following:

- 2018, Distinguished Professorship, University of Colorado at Boulder
- 2018, Ada Doisy Lectures in Biochemistry, University of Illinois at Urbana
- 2018, Keynote Speaker, Ionis/Nature Conference on RNA Biology at La Jolla, California
- 2018, Distinguished Visitor Lecture Series, Max-Planck Institute of Biochemistry, Germany
- 2018, Keynote Speaker, Center for RNA Biomedicine Symposium, University of Michigan
- 2018, Keynote Speaker, 3rd International Brainstorm Symposium, University of Florida
- 2017, Keynote Speaker, SFB Symposium, Regensburg
- 2017, Keynote Speaker, 2nd International Symposium on Stress Granules, Heidelberg
- 2017, Keynote Speaker, City of Hope, Duarte, CA
- 2017, Keynote Speaker, EMBO Conference, Barga, Italy
- 2012, Member, National Academy of Sciences
- 2012, Keynote Speaker, FASEB
- 2011, Keynote Speaker, EMBL
- 2010, Fellow, American Academy of Arts and Sciences
- 2010, President, The RNA Society
- 2006, Keynote Speaker, Translation Control Meeting, Cold Spring Harbor Labs
- 2005, Keynote Speaker, Translation and Control Meeting, Heidelberg, Germany
- 2005, Keynote Speaker, EMBO Workshop, Switzerland
- 2005, Method to Extend Research in Time (MERIT), National Institutes of Health
- 2003, Galileo Fellow, University of Arizona
- 2003, Regents’ Professor, University of Arizona
- 2002, Keynote Speaker, FASEB Conference on Post-transcriptional Regulation
- 2000, Keynote Speaker, Michigan RNA Conference
- 1994, Investigator, Howard Hughes Medical Institute
- 1990, scholar, Searle Scholars
- 1979, Regents’ Fellowship, University of California at San Francisco
