= Albert Dorfman =

American biochemical geneticist

- Born: 1916; Chicago
- Died: 1982 (aged 65–66)
- Education: University of Chicago
- Known for: Discovery of the cause of Hurler's syndrome
- Relatives: Ralph Dorfman (brother)
- Scientific career
- Fields: Biochemical genetics
- Institutions: University of Chicago

Albert Dorfman (1916–1982) was an American biochemical geneticist, notable for discovery of the cause of Hurler's syndrome. He was also noted for his contributions to vaccine against Streptococcus infections. He also contributed to advances against rheumatic fever. Dorfman was a member of the National Academy of Sciences, Director of the La Rabida Children's Hospital of the University of Chicago, Chairman of the Department of Pediatrics of the University of Chicago, Director of the Joseph P. Kennedy, Jr. Mental Retardation Research Center, Richard T. Crane Distinguished Service Professor of Pediatrics and Biochemistry.

== Life and career ==
Dorfman was born and grew up in Chicago. Dorfman received his B.S. degree in 1936, a Ph.D. degree in 1939, and an M.D. degree in 1944 – all from the University of Chicago.

- 1948 – becomes an assistant professor of Pediatrics at the University of Chicago
- 1957 – becomes Professor of Pediatrics and Biochemistry
- 1957–1972 – he serves as Director of the La Rabida Children's Hospital of the University of Chicago
- 1962–1972 – he serves as Chairman of the Department of Pediatrics
- 1967 – July 27, 1982 – he was Director of the Joseph P. Kennedy, Jr. Mental Retardation Research Center and the Richard T. Crane Distinguished Service Professor of Pediatrics and Biochemistry

His brother was Ralph Dorfman.
