= Due to Lack of Interest, Tomorrow Has Been Canceled =

1969 book by Irene Kampen

- Author: Irene Kampen
- Language: English
- Publisher: Doubleday & Co.
- Publication date: 1969
- Publication place: United States
- OCLC: 36121

Due to Lack of Interest, Tomorrow Has Been Canceled is a 1969 book by American writer Irene Kampen, an account of her return to school at the University of Wisconsin–Madison after 25 years, and how she learned to adapt to the student culture of the late 1960s. While it is listed as non-fiction, Kampen included fictionalized students and other characters in the book. The book is referenced in the film The Last of England (1987), directed and written by Derek Jarman.

The expression is also the title of the last track of the 1968 jazz record, "America the Beautiful", by arranger Gary McFarland, and it is a line in the Kaiser Chiefs' 2007 song "Ruby". It was also used as the title of a 1971 BBC Horizon documentary on predictions of ecological disaster, focusing on the work of Paul Ehrlich.
