= Tryptophan repressor =

Transcription factor

Trp repressor protein
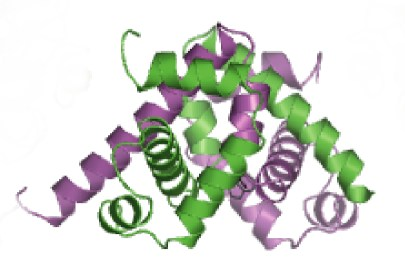
- Ribbon diagram of the trpR protein

Identifiers
- Symbol: Trp_repressor
- Pfam: PF01371
- Pfam clan: CL0123
- InterPro: IPR000831
- SCOP2: 2wrp / SCOPe / SUPFAM
Available protein structures:
- Pfam: structures / ECOD
- PDB: RCSB PDB; PDBe; PDBj
- PDBsum: structure summary

Trp operon repressor

Identifiers
- Organism: Escherichia coli
- Symbol: trpR
- Entrez: 948917
- RefSeq (Prot): NP_418810
- UniProt: P0A881

Other data
- Chromosome: genome: 4.63 - 4.63 Mb
Search for
- Structures: Swiss-model
- Domains: InterPro

Tryptophan repressor (or trp repressor) is a transcription factor involved in controlling amino acid metabolism. It has been best studied in Escherichia coli, where it is a dimeric protein that regulates transcription of the 5 genes in the tryptophan operon. When the amino acid tryptophan is plentiful in the cell, it binds to the protein, which causes a conformational change in the protein. The repressor complex then binds to its operator sequence in the genes it regulates, shutting off the genes.

One of the genes regulated by trp repressor, trpR, codes for the tryptophan repressor protein itself. This is a form of feedback regulation. However, these genes are located on different operons.

The (tryptophan) repressor is a 25 kD protein homodimer which regulates transcription of the tryptophan biosynthetic pathway in bacteria. There are 5 operons which are regulated by trpR: the trpEDCBA, trpR, AroH, AroL, and mtr operons.

== Mechanism ==
When the amino acid tryptophan is in plentiful supply in the cell, trpR binds 2 molecules of tryptophan, which alters its structure and dynamics so that it becomes able to bind to operator DNA. When this occurs, transcription of the DNA is prevented, suppressing the products of the gene - proteins which make more tryptophan. When the cellular levels of tryptophan decline, the tryptophan molecules on the repressor fall off, allowing the repressor to return to its inactive form.

trpR also controls the regulation of its own production, through regulation of the trpR gene.

The structure of the ligand-bound holorepressor, and the ligand-free forms have been determined by both X-ray crystallography and NMR.

The trp operon consists of a regulatory gene, a promoter, an operator, and a terminator. The trp operon is active only when cellular tryptophan is scarce. If there isn't enough tryptophan, the repressor protein breaks off from the operator (where the repressor is normally bound) and RNA polymerase can complete its reading of the strand of DNA. If the RNA polymerase reaches the terminator (at the end of the DNA strand), the enzymes for tryptophan biosynthesis are expressed.

== See also ==
- trp operon
- Paul Sigler
