= Bernard Horecker =

American biochemist

- Horecker in 1966
- Born: Bernard Leonard Horecker; 31 October 1914; Chicago, Illinois, USA
- Died: 10 October 2010 (aged 95); Fort Myers, Florida, USA
- Education: University of Chicago (Ph.D. 1939)
- Known for: Elucidating the pentose phosphate pathway, Current Topics in Cellular Regulation (founding editor)
- Parents: Paul Horecker (father); Bessie (Bornstein) Horecker (mother)
- Scientific career
- Fields: Biochemistry
- Institutions: National institutes of Health, New York University Grossman School of Medicine, Albert Einstein College of Medicine, Roche Institute of Molecular Biology, Cornell University
- Doctoral advisor: Thorfin R. Hogness
- Doctoral students: J. Edwin Seegmiller

Bernard Leonard (Bernie) Horecker (1914–2010) was an American biochemist known for work on the pentose phosphate pathway, and for cellular regulation in general.

== Birth and education ==
Bernard Horecker was born in Chicago on 31 October 1914. He studied at the University of Chicago and obtained his Ph.D. there in 1939. Laureate honoris causa in Biological Sciences, University of Urbino, Italy, 1982.

== Career ==
=== Principal positions ===
Starting as a biochemist at the United States Public Health Service at the National Institutes of Health, Bethesda, Maryland from 1941 to 1959, Horecker moved to the New York University Grossman School of Medicine, until 1963, then at the Albert Einstein College of Medicine and the Roche Institute of Molecular Biology in Nutley, New Jersey and finally at Cornell University.

=== Visiting positions ===
He was a visiting professor of biochemistry at the University of California in 1954, and a guest research worker at the Pasteur Institute, Paris, 1957-1958. Later he had many visiting appointments, both in USA and in other countries, including Paraná (Brazil), Kyoto (Japan), Ferrara (Italy), and Rotterdam (The Netherlands).

=== Editorial work ===
Horecker was (with Earl Stadtman) founding editor of Current Topics in Cellular Regulation, a major series in the subject, and continued in the role up to volume 23 (1984).

== Research ==
According to Kresge and colleagues Horecker "made seminal contributions to our understanding of the enzyme-catalyzed reactions in carbohydrate metabolism, especially those of the pentose phosphate pathway." He started his scientific career with a manometric study of succinate dehydrogenase. Later he worked with Arthur Kornberg on spectroscopic aspects of pyridine nucleotides, with whom he also studied glucose 6-phosphate dehydrogenase. However, he is best known for his work in elucidating the pentose phosphate pathway. Much of his work, especially of the enzymes on aldolase and transaldolase was done in collaboration with Sandro Pontremoli at the University of Genoa.

Horecker published many papers, of which Web of Science lists 450, many of them highly cited. The breadth of his work can be judged from papers on a wide variety of topics, such as galactose oxidase, metabolic formation of phosphglycerate, protein kinase-C, release of alkaline phosphatase from bacterial cells and prothymosin-α.

== Awards ==
Horecker was elected to the National Academy of Sciences in 1961, and received many other awards, including the presidency of the American Society for Biochemistry and Molecular Biology (at the time the American Society of Biological Chemists), and was the first recipient of its Merck Award in 1981. In 1952 he received the Paul Lewis Award in Enzyme Chemistry (now the Pfizer Award in Enzyme Chemistry) from the Division of Biological Chemistry of the American Chemical Society.

Horecker was twice nominated for the Nobel Prize in Chemistry, by Leopold Ružička in 1957, and by Felix Haurowitz in 1961.

== Death and family ==
Bernard Horecker died in Fort Myers, Florida, in 2010, survived by his widow Frances (Goldstein) Horecker.
