= Gottfried Schatz =

Swiss-Austrian biochemist (1936–2015)

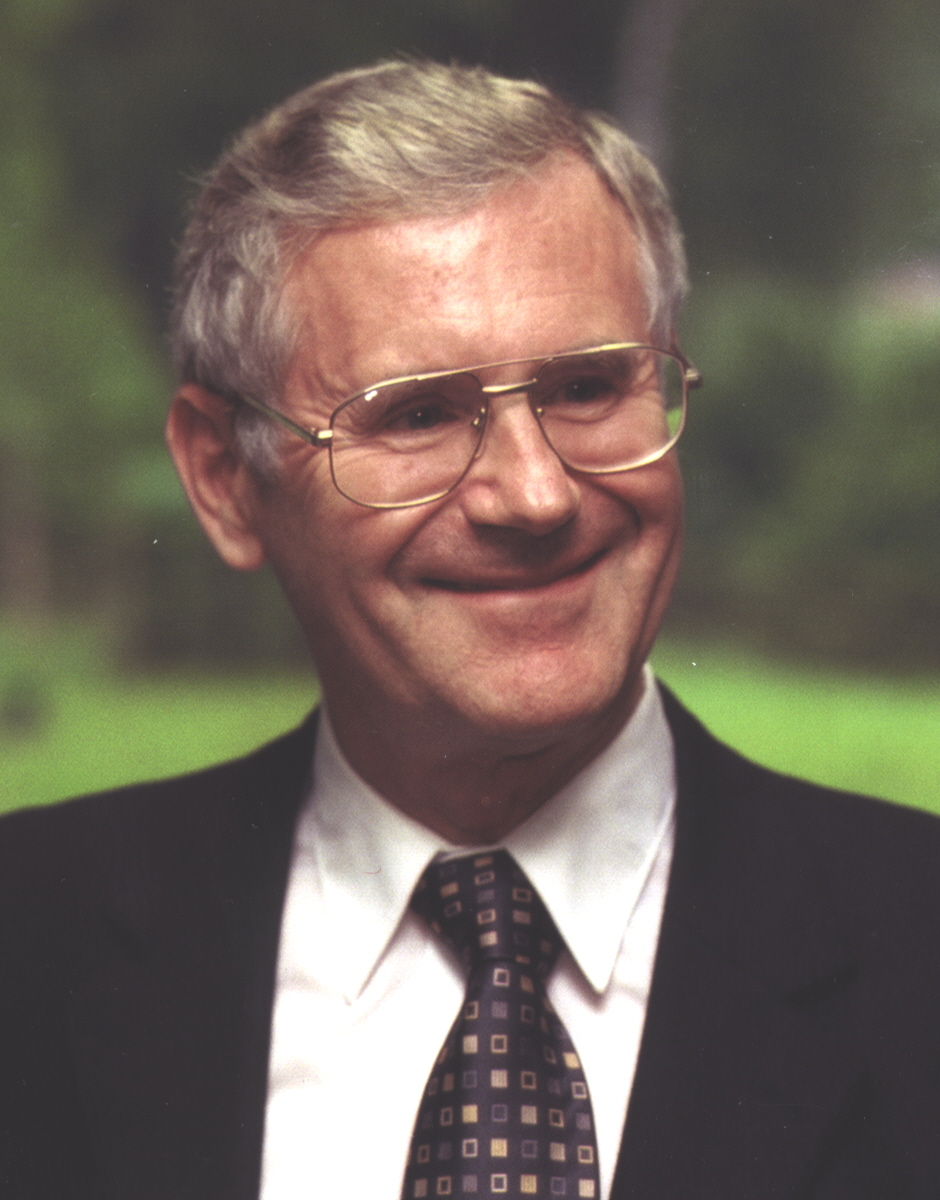
Gottfried Schatz

Gottfried Schatz (18 August 1936 – 1 October 2015) was a Swiss-Austrian biochemist.

== Life and career ==
Schatz was born in Strem. Upon obtaining his PhD in chemistry and biochemistry at the University of Graz (Austria), he did postdoctoral work at the University of Vienna and at "The Public Health Institute" of the City of New York. In 1968, he emigrated to the US in order to assume a professorship Cornell University in Ithaca, New York. Six years later, he returned to Europe in order to join the newly created Biozentrum at the University of Basel, which he chaired from 1983 to 1985, From 1984 to 1989 he was Secretary General of the European Molecular Biology Organization (EMBO). After his retirement in 2000, he presided the Swiss Science and Technology Council (SSTC) until 2003. He is the author of more than 200 professional publications as well as of two books of essays on the broader implications of science. His scientific autobiography Interplanetary travels was published in 2000.

Schatz died on 1 October 2015, aged 79.

== Work ==
Schatz played a leading role in elucidating the biogenesis of mitochondria and in discovering mitochondrial DNA. He recognized that this DNA encoded only a small number of mitochondrial proteins which was decisive for his further research on the import of proteins into the mitochondria and the degradation of proteins within these organelles. Schatz discovered a complex transport system that recognizes mitochondrial proteins made in the cytoplasm by specific signals attached to these proteins and then transfers them into the mitochondria. This system comprises two protein complexes, TOM and TIM, which are localized in the outer and inner mitochondrial membranes respectively. Mutations in these complexes can disrupt protein import and cause illnesses such as the neurodegenerative Mohr-Tranebjaerg syndrome, which leads to deafness. Schatz also demonstrated that the energy-requiring protease Lon regulates protein turnover within the mitochondria, thus maintaining the integrity and the proper functioning of mitochondrial DNA. Gottfried Schatz is the author of more than 200 scientific publications, three volumes of essays, an autobiography and a novel. His books have appeared in English, French, Greek and Czech translation.

== Honorary memberships and prizes ==
- 1967 Innitzer Prize
- 1983 Emil Christian Hansen Gold Medal, Carlsberg Foundation
- 1985 Honorary Member, Japanese Biochemical Society
- 1986 Sir Hans Krebs Medal, Federation of European Biochemical Societies
- 1985 Member, German Academy of Sciences Leopoldina
- 1987 Foreign Member, American Academy of Arts and Sciences
- 1988 Otto Warburg Medal, Society for Biochemistry and Molecular Biology, Germany
- 1988 Member, Academia Europaea
- 1989 Foreign Associate, US National Academy of Sciences
- 1990 Louis-Jeantet Prize for Medicine
- 1991 Austrian Cross of Honour for Science and Art, 1st class
- 1992 Prix Marcel Benoist
- 1993 Schleiden Medal, Deutsche Akademie Leopoldina
- 1993 Foreign Associate, Austrian Academy of Sciences
- 1994 Member, North Rhine-Westphalia Academy for Sciences and Arts
- 1996 Honorary Doctorate, Comenius University in Bratislava
- 1997 Lynen Medal, University of Miami, USA
- 1997 Foreign Member, Royal Swedish Academy of Sciences
- 1998 Gairdner Foundation International Award, Toronto
- 1998 Foreign Member, Royal Netherlands Academy of Arts and Sciences
- 2000 Grand Decoration of Honour in Silver for Services to the Republic of Austria
- 2000 Honorary Doctorate, Stockholm University
- 2000 E. B. Wilson Medal, American Society of Cell Biology
- 2004 Feltrinelli Prize, Rome
- 2006 Reinach Prize
- 2008 Fellow of the American Association for the Advancement of Science
- 2009 Austrian Decoration for Science and Art
- 2009 European Prize for Culture in Science, European Foundation for Culture «Pro Europa»
- 2010 International Austrian of the Year

== Books for a general audience ==
- Gottfried Schatz: Feuersucher: Die Jagd nach dem Geheimnis der Lebensenergie – NZZ Buchverlag, Zürich, 2011 – ISBN 3-03823-677-2
- Gottfried Schatz: A Matter of Wonder. What Biology Reveals about Us, Our World, and Our Dreams (Translated by A. Shields). S. Karger AG, Basel, 2011 – ISBN 978-3-8055-9744-9
- Gottfried Schatz: Jeff’s View on Science and Scientists,. Elsevier BV/FEBS 2006 – ISBN 978-0-444-52133-0
- Gottfried Schatz: Jenseits der Gene. Essays über unser Wesen, unsere Welt und unsere Träume, NZZ Libro, 2012 (4. Aufl.) – ISBN 978-3-03823-780-8; Audio Version on CD: Kein & Aber, 2008 – ISBN 978-3-0369-1246-2
- Gottfried Schatz: Die Welt in der wir leben: Ein Biologe über unser Wesen, unsere Träume und den Grund der Dinge – Herder, 2010 – ISBN 3-451-05792-1 (vergriffen).
- Gottfried Schatz: Feuersucher: Die Jagd nach dem Geheimnis der Lebensenergie. NZZ Libro, Zürich 2011, ISBN 978-3-03823-677-1.
- Gottfried Schatz: Zaubergarten Biologie. Wie biologische Entdeckungen unser Menschenbild prägen. NZZ Libro, Zürich 2012, ISBN 978-3-03823-753-2
- Postdoc, Roman, Styria-Verlag, 2015, ISBN 978-3-222-13486-9
