= Susan S. Taylor =

American biochemist

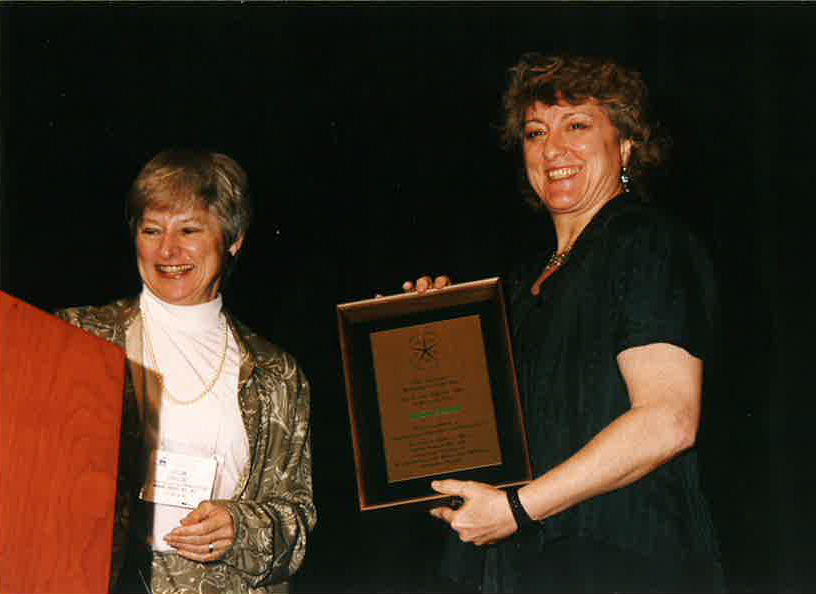
- Taylor (left) with Heidi Hamm, inaugural fellows of the American Society for Biochemistry and Molecular Biology
- Born: 1942 (age 83–84); Racine, Wisconsin, US
- Education: University of Wisconsin, Johns Hopkins University
- Known for: Studies of protein kinase A, including the first kinase crystal structure
- Awards: United States National Academy of Sciences, 1996; Institute of Medicine, 1996
- Scientific career
- Fields: Biochemistry
- Workplaces: University of California, San Diego

Susan Taylor (born 1942) is an American biochemist who is a Professor of Chemistry and Biochemistry and a Professor of Pharmacology at the University of California, San Diego. She is known for her research on protein kinases, particularly protein kinase A (PKA). She was elected to the Institute of Medicine and the United States National Academy of Sciences in 1996.

== Early life and education ==
Taylor was born in 1942 in Racine, Wisconsin. She attended the University of Wisconsin as an undergraduate and received a B.A. in biochemistry in 1964. Despite originally planning for a career as a medical doctor, she received her PhD in physiological chemistry from Johns Hopkins University in 1968. Then she worked as a postdoctoral fellow at the Medical Research Council Laboratory of Molecular Biology in Cambridge, England, where she has said she settled on a career in research science. After returning to the United States, she worked as a postdoc at the University of California, San Diego.

== Academic career ==
After a brief postdoc position at UCSD, Taylor joined the faculty there in the Department of Chemistry and Biochemistry in 1972 and became a full professor in 1985. She was a Howard Hughes Medical Institute Investigator from 1997 to 2014.

Taylor served on the editorial board of the Journal of Biological Chemistry from 1985-1990 and served a term as the president of the American Society for Biochemistry and Molecular Biology in 1995.

== Research ==
Taylor's research group has focused on the structure and function of protein kinases, particularly protein kinase A, since shortly after she began her independent research career. Her group, collaborating with Janusz Sowadski, was the first to solve the crystal structure of a protein kinase when they reported the structure of PKA in 1991. The group has subsequently published numerous papers on the dynamics and mechanism of PKA, or cyclic AMP-dependent protein kinase.

== Awards and honors ==
- 1992: Elected to the American Academy of Arts and Sciences
- 1996: Elected to the Institute of Medicine
- 1996: Elected to the United States National Academy of Sciences
- 2001: Received the Garvan-Olin Medal, awarded by the American Chemical Society
- 2007: Received the William C. Rose Award, awarded by the American Society for Biochemistry and Molecular Biology
- 2008: Elected to the American Association for the Advancement of Science
- 2009: Received the FASEB Excellence in Science Award, awarded by the Federation of American Societies for Experimental Biology
- 2017: Earl and Thressa Stadtman Distinguished Scientist Award
- 2022: Herbert Tabor Research Award
