= William J. Lennarz =

American biochemist (1934–2021)

William Lennarz
- Born: September 28, 1934; New York City, U.S.
- Died: October 27, 2021 (aged 87); Williamsburg, Virginia, U.S.
- Education: Pennsylvania State University (BS); University of Illinois Urbana-Champaign (PhD)
- Employer(s): Harvard University; University of Texas Cancer Center; Johns Hopkins University; Stony Brook University
- Title: Professor Emeritus of Department of Biochemistry and Cell Biology

William Joseph Lennarz (September 28, 1934 – October 27, 2021) was a biochemist at Stony Brook University. He focused the majority of his research on biochemical processes in cells.

== Early life and education ==
William J. Lennarz was born in New York City on September 28, 1934. he studied chemistry and organic chemistry. After working as a postdoctoral researcher at Harvard University, he developed an interest in biochemistry, before taking a role at Stony Brook University. He began his academic career at Pennsylvania State University as a chemical engineering major, but eventually changed his course of study to chemistry. After graduating from Pennsylvania State University in 1956 with a bachelor of science in chemistry, he attended the University of Illinois Urbana-Champaign and received a Ph.D. in organic chemistry in 1959.

While attending the University of Illinois, Lennarz researched the use of boronic acids as a potential cancer treatment. When a beam of neutrons is applied to boron, it is capable of emitting alpha particles that have the ability to kill cells. With this property in mind, he attempted to incorporate boronic acids into cancer cells to create a mechanism to selectively destroy tumor cells. While in graduate school, he developed an interest in biochemistry that lead him to pursue postdoc work under Konrad Bloch at Harvard University. At Harvard University, he worked on research pertaining to the biosynthesis of fatty acids in yeast. Through his work at Harvard, he was able to play a role in discovering acyl carrier protein, which is an enzyme in the fatty acid biosynthesis cycle. After leaving Harvard University, Lennarz was employed at Johns Hopkins and the University of Texas Cancer Center before arriving at Stony Brook. Lennarz had over two hundred publications, roughly half of them coming after his arrival at Stony Brook in 1989. His lab focused mostly on studying glycoprotein synthesis.

== Notable work ==
=== Early work ===
Before his tenure at Stony Brook, Lennarz was involved in some notable studies. Along with Luis Leloir, Robert Spiro, Edward Heath, Lennarz was able to determine the mechanism by which N-linked oligosaccharides are added to proteins in the endoplasmic reticulum. Lennarz and his lab mates discovered that these sugars are transferred as a group, and are synthesized from a dolichol-linked oligosaccharide with a conserved structure. They found the precursor for these molecules had the structure (Man)_{n}GlcNAc^{B1,4} →GlcNAc-P-P-dolichol, and each precursor had at least five mannose residues. Additionally, they discovered that precursor molecules contain one to two glucose molecules, which was a surprising find. Up until this point, all N-linked oligosaccharides that had been characterized lacked glucose molecules. This lead the group to postulate that the oligosaccharide component of the precursor was modified by glycosidase enzymes before the glycoprotein could be considered mature. This work was very important in laying the foundation for later research that described the mechanism for the complete assembly glycoproteins in the endoplasmic reticulum.

=== Later work ===
In 2006, Lennarz and several colleagues published a study on the peptide N-glycanase (PNGase). This protein helps in the process of misfolded glycoprotein degradation by removing oligosaccharide chains from the proteins. Lennarz and colleagues used the mouse PNGase Png1P to study the interaction of this protein with the proteasome. GST fusion proteins of each protein being observed in the study were produced in E. coli in order to reliably purify each protein. The study found that in vitro, the mouse PNGase interacted directly with the proteins mHR23B and ms4. It was previously believed that ATP was a requirement for PNGases to interact with the proteasome, but this study found that this was not the case. Through this study, Lennarz and his team were also able to determine which region of the mouse PNGase was responsible for binding to ms4. It was found that the N-terminus of the PNGase was essential in binding to ms4. Compared to yeast PNGase proteins, which had been previously studied at the time of this experiment, mice PNGase proteins have an extended N-terminus that contains a PUB domain. By truncating PNGase amino acids 1-171 (which compose the N-terminus), Lennarz and his team found this additional domain was not sufficient to bind ms4 by itself, indicating that the entirety of the N-terminus is required for proper binding. The C-terminal domain, which was found to bind mHR23B, was also analyzed by Lennarz and his team. They discovered that binding to mHR23B is likely what activates the C-terminal catalytic domain of PNGase. Binding of these two proteins was also found to govern the interaction between mHR23B and p97, another protein involved in the proteasome degradation pathway. The two binding proteins were also found to compete with each other to bind the PNGase, and a complex of all three proteins was found to be unable to form.

Another notable study by Lennarz sought to determine the location at which oligosaccharyltransferase (OT) binds the ribosome. This enzyme is responsible for transferring high mannose oligosaccharides to polypeptides translocating into the lumen of the endoplasmic reticulum. The study used purified ribosomes and yeast oligosaccharyltransferase to conduct each experiment. It was found that OT binds the ribosome, and the Sec61 translocon complex binds the ribosome as well to form a complex to glycosylate N-linked oligosaccharides on proteins translocating into the endoplasmic reticulum. Additionally, Lennarz and his team showed that OT binds the 60S subunit of 80S yeast ribosomes in a 1:1 molar ratio through chemical cross-linking experiments. The protein was found to specifically bind to the location on the ribosome where the translocating polypeptide exits, which is supported by its enzymatic function.

Lennarz was later involved in the study of the structure of the Sec63 translocon complex, which is involved in translocating pre-synthesized polypeptides from the cytosol to the lumen of the endoplasmic reticulum. Using cryo-electron microscopy, the heptameric structure of the complex was able to be visualized in greater detail. The complex was found to have a mass of 287 kilodaltons, as was found to be composed of three subcomplexes. The complex was found to be composed of a Sec61-Sbh1-Sss1 translocon complex, a heterotetramer composed of Sec62-Sec63-Sec71-Sec72, and a trimer composed of Sec63-Sec71-Sec72. During their assessment of the study of this complex, Lennarz and his team also found that positively charged amino acids in the Sec61 component of the complex were responsible for mediating the formation of the complex. These amino acids were found to inhibit the formation of the Sec63 translocon complex.

== Death ==
Lennarz died in Williamsburg, Virginia on October 27, 2021, at the age of 87.
