= William F. Harrington =

American biochemist (1920–1992)

William Fields Harrington (1920 – 1992) was an American biochemist known for his work on the structure and function of myosins and collagen.

== Early life and education ==
William Fields Harrington was born in Seattle on September 25, 1920. As a young man, Harrington worked at a Seattle aircraft manufacturing plant, then served in the US Marine Corps during World War II. After the war, Harrington enrolled at the University of California, Berkeley where he earned his BS degree, followed by a PhD in the laboratory of Howard Schachman, where he studied the structure of tobacco mosaic virus. While at Berkeley, he met Austrian-born musician Ingeborg Leuschner; the couple married in 1948. After his PhD, Harrington moved on to successive postdoctoral researcher positions: first a year at Cambridge University, then in the laboratory of Kai Linderstrom-Lang at the Carlsberg Laboratory.

== Academic career ==
In 1955, Harrington joined the faculty of Iowa State College as an assistant professor of biophysical chemistry. After just a year, Harrington left Iowa to join Christian Anfinsen's laboratory at the National Institutes of Health. There he began his work on fibrous proteins: first collagen, then myosins. In 1960, he moved to Johns Hopkins University as professor at the Department of Biology and the university's McCollum-Pratt Institute. He served as that department's chairman from 1973 to 1983. Harrington was elected to the US National Academy of Sciences in 1976.

Harrington was known for his work on myosins and collagen. His work on myosins helped elucidate how chemical energy in the body is converted the mechanical process of muscle contraction.

Over his career, Harrington authored or co-authored over 125 scientific journal articles.

== Personal life ==
Harrington and his wife had a daughter and four sons. Harrington died of heart failure at his home on October 31, 1992.
