= Journal of Lipid Research =

- Discipline: Lipids
- Language: English
- Edited by: Nicholas O. Davidson, Kerry-Anne Rye

Publication details
- History: 1959–present
- Publisher: American Society for Biochemistry and Molecular Biology (United States)
- Open access: Delayed, after 12 months/Hybrid
- Impact factor: 6.5 (2022)

Standard abbreviations
- ISO 4: J. Lipid Res.

Indexing
- CODEN: JLPRA
- ISSN: 0022-2275 (print); 1539-7262 (web)
- LCCN: 62001186
- OCLC no.: 01589637

Links
- Journal homepage; Online access; Online archive

The Journal of Lipid Research is a monthly peer-reviewed open access scientific journal that was established in 1959. Since 2000, it has been published by the American Society for Biochemistry and Molecular Biology. It covers research on lipids in health and disease, including lipid function and the biochemical and genetic regulation of lipid metabolism. The journal also covers patient-oriented and epidemiological research. In its aim and scope, the journal "aims to be on the forefront of the emerging areas of genomics, proteomics, metabolomics, and lipidomics as they relate to lipid metabolism and function."

The journal is published in print and online. As of February 1, 2019, its editors-in-chief are Kerry-Anne Rye and Nick Davidson.

The journal was established in response to the lack of published methodologies in lipid research as perceived by Edward H. Ahrens, Jr., Donald Zilversmit, and others, who founded Lipid Research Inc. to publish the journal.

Prior to its current home at the American Society for Biochemistry and Molecular Biology, the journal was based at Rockefeller University, Albert Einstein College of Medicine, and the Federation of American Societies for Experimental Biology.
