= Thressa Stadtman =

American biochemist

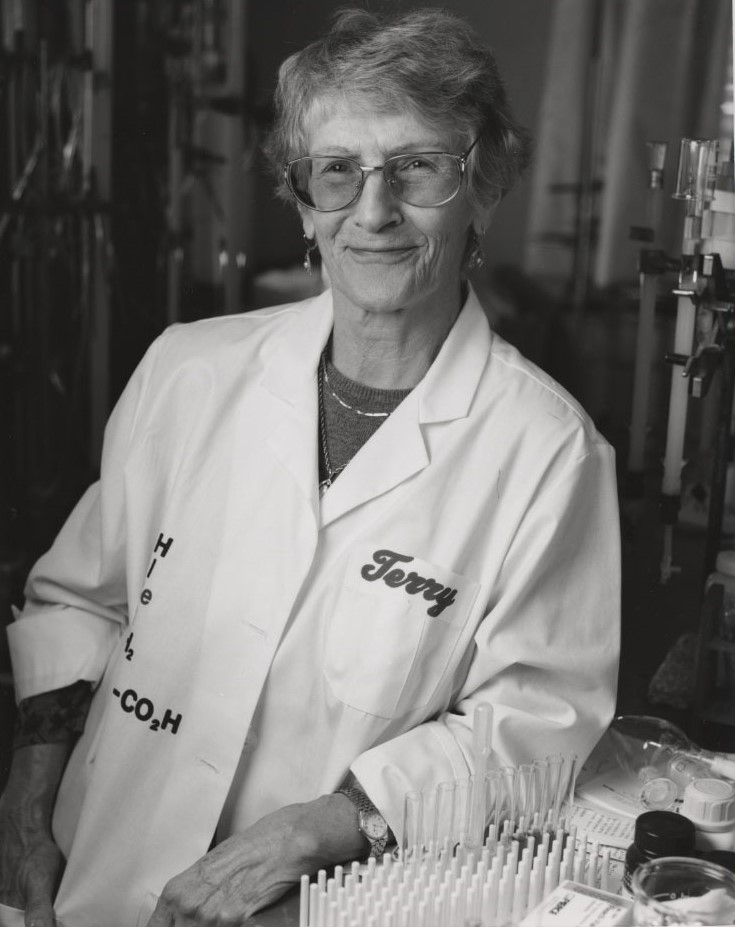
- Thressa Stadtman in her lab, c. 1970s
- Born: Thressa Campbell; February 12, 1920; Sterling, New York
- Died: December 11, 2016 (aged 96); Derwood, Maryland
- Education: Cornell University; University of California, Berkeley
- Known for: Discovery of selenoproteins; Member of the National Academy of Sciences
- Spouse: Earl Reece Stadtman
- Scientific career
- Fields: Biochemistry
- Workplaces: National Heart, Lung, and Blood Institute
- Thesis: Studies on the methane-producing bacteria. (1949)
- Doctoral advisor: Horace Albert Barker

Thressa Campbell Stadtman (February 12, 1920 – December 11, 2016) was an American biochemist, notable for her discovery of selenocysteine, and her research on selenoproteins and bioenergetics. In addition she made significant advances in amino acid metabolism, enzymes dependent on vitamin B12, and the biochemistry of microbes.

== Life ==
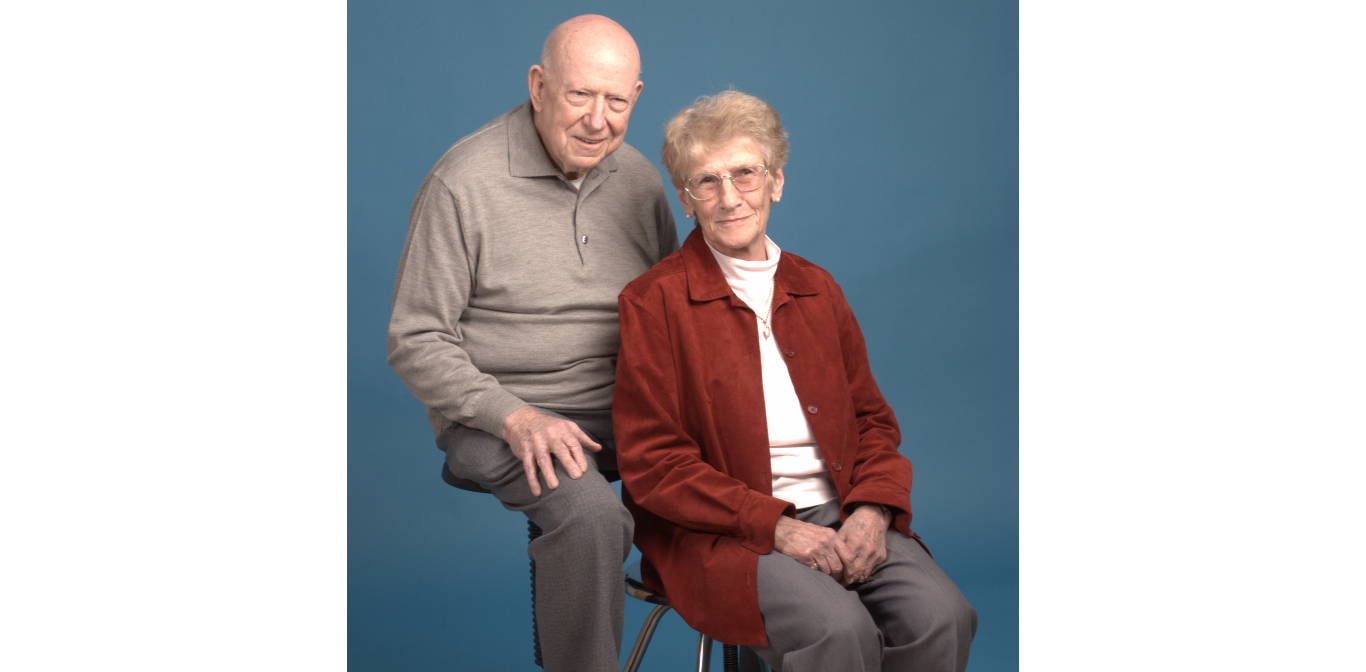
Drs Thressa and Earl Stadtman

In 1920, she was born in Sterling, New York. In 1940, she graduated from Cornell University, with a B.S. in Microbiology, and in 1942, with a M.S. in Microbiology and Nutrition. In 1949, she graduated from the University of California, Berkeley, with a Ph.D. in Microbial Biochemistry. Her thesis was titled "Studies on Methane Fermentations", and subsequently worked as a postdoc for Christian B. Anfinsen at Harvard Medical School.

She was married to Earl Reece Stadtman whom she met when they were both graduate students at the University of California, Berkeley. They were both hired by what was then the National Heart Institute in 1950 becoming the first husband-and-wife team at the National Institutes of Health (NIH). They both oversaw their own biochemistry labs and collaborated closely. In 2005, they were both honored by the NIH with an exhibit titled "The Stadtman Way: A Tale of Two Biochemists at NIH."

Stadtman conducted research on vitamin B12 metabolism, methane biosynthesis, and selenium biochemistry. She retired from the NIH in 2009.

Over a 60-year period, starting in 1943, she published 212 peer-reviewed papers.

Stadtman was elected a member of the National Academy of Sciences in 1981.

Stadtman died in December 2016 at the age of 96.
