= Joan W. Conaway =

American biochemist

- Education: Bryn Mawr College; Stanford University
- Partner: Ron Conaway
- Scientific career
- Institutions: DNAX Research Institute; Oklahoma Medical Research Foundation; Stowers Institute for Medical Research; University of Kansas School of Medicine

Joan Weliky Conaway is an American biochemist who researches gene transcription. She worked at the Stowers Institute for Medical Research from 2001 to 2021 and currently serves as vice provost and dean for basic research at the University of Texas Southwestern Medical Center. She is a member of the National Academy of Sciences and American Academy of Arts and Sciences .

== Early life and education ==
Joan Weliky grew up in Pittsburgh, Pennsylvania and Hopewell, New Jersey. Her father Irving Weliky and her mother Virginia née Spicer, were both biochemists, though Virginia gave up her work to be a full-time homemaker. She attended Bryn Mawr College, where she was initially undecided between majoring in biomedical science or political science. After her freshman year, she worked in a pharmaceutical company's immunology lab, which was when she made up her mind to become a biomedical scientist. She later was a graduate student at Stanford University under the advisorship of future Nobel laureate Roger D. Kornberg, graduating with a PhD in cell biology.

== Career ==
After finishing her PhD, she completed a postdoctoral research appointment at DNAX Research Institute. She then worked at Oklahoma Medical Research Foundation. In 2001 she joined the faculty of the Stowers Institute for Medical Research in Kansas City, Missouri. In 2005 she became Helen Nelson Distinguished Chair at Stowers Institute. While at the Stowers Institute, she was additionally a professor in University of Kansas School of Medicine's department of biochemistry and molecular biology. In 2021, she moved to the University of Texas Southwestern Medical Center, where she holds the Cecil H. Green Distinguished Chair in Cellular and Molecular Biology and is vice provost, dean of basic research, and professor of molecular biology. With her husband, Ron Conaway, she publishes research about the molecular mechanisms by which transcription factors and regulatory protein complexes control gene transcription.

== Awards and honors ==
In 2002 she became a member of the American Academy of Arts and Sciences. She is a recipient of the Edward L. and Thelma Gaylord Award for Scientific Excellence (1991) and the ASBMB – Amgen Award (1997). In 2020 she was elected to the National Academy of Sciences in the biochemistry division. In August 2023, Joan Conaway was elected president of the American Society for Molecular Biology and Biochemistry (ASBMB).

== Personal life ==
She is married to fellow researcher Ronald Conaway. She and Ronald enjoy jazz performances.
