= Leemor Joshua-Tor =

- לימור יהושע-תור
- Born: 1961 (age 64–65); Rehovot, Israel
- Education: Tel-Aviv University; Weizmann Institute of Science
- Scientific career
- Workplaces: Cold Spring Harbor Laboratory; Caltech

Leemor Joshua-Tor (Hebrew: לימור יהושע-תור; born 1961) is the W.M. Keck Professor of Structural Biology at Cold Spring Harbor Laboratory and a Howard Hughes Medical Institute Investigator. Her research focuses on the role of the argonaute complex in RNA interference.

== Early life and education ==
Leemor Joshua-Tor was born in Rehovot, Israel. She received a B.S. from Tel-Aviv University in chemistry, then served for three years in the Israel Defense Forces. She earned a PhD in chemistry in the lab of Joel Sussman from the Weizmann Institute of Science in 1991, then did postdoctoral research at Caltech.

== Career ==
Joshua-Tor joined the faculty at Cold Spring Harbor Laboratory in 1995 and was promoted to full professor in 2005. She was Dean of the Watson School of Biological Sciences from 2007 to 2012. She is a faculty advisor of CSHL's Women in Science and Engineering group. She has been an HHMI investigator since 2008.

In 2005, her lab published the structure of argonaute, helping to demonstrate its role in RNA interference, and she is known for her research on argonaute's slicer. She has collaborated extensively with Greg Hannon. Joshua-Tor's research has shed light on how the proteins responsible for RNA interference function.

== Awards ==
- 1996: Beckman Young Investigator Award
- Howard Hughes Medical Institute Investigator
- 2017: Elected to the National Academy of Sciences
- 2017: Elected to the American Academy of Arts and Sciences
- 2018: ASBMB Mildred Cohn Award in Biological Chemistry
- 2019: Harvey Lecture
