= Mary Edmonds =

American biochemist

Mary Patricia Edmonds
- Born: May 7, 1922
- Died: April 16, 2005 (aged 82)
- Education: University of Pennsylvania
- Scientific career
- Thesis: Studies on the biosynthesis of purines and pyrimidines in growing yeast (1951)

Mary P. Edmonds (May 7, 1922 – April 16, 2005) was an American biochemist who made key discoveries regarding the processing of messenger RNA (mRNA). She spent most of her career at the University of Pittsburgh.

== Education and career ==
Edmonds was born May 7, 1922, in Racine, Wisconsin. She received a bachelor's degree from Milwaukee-Downer College in 1943, a master's degree from Wellesley College in 1945, and a Ph.D. from the University of Pennsylvania in 1951. Following her Ph.D., she was a postdoctoral researcher at University of Illinois (1950-1952) and University of Wisconsin (1952-1955), and then joined Montefiore Hospital in Pittsburgh as a research associate from 1955 until 1965. Starting in 1962 she held appointments at the University of Pittsburgh, initially as adjunct and research professor positions, until she joined the faculty in 1971 and was promoted to professor in 1976.

Edmonds took emeritus status in 1992, and died of complications related to a heart attack on April 16, 2005.

== Research ==
Edmonds was known for her research in mRNA processing, specifically on 3'-end processing and how RNA is spliced. Her research showed that the end of mRNA is a poly-A tail composed of multiple adenosine residues. In her memoirs posted at the National Academy of Sciences, her work discovering the poly-A tails on eukaryotic mRNA and purification of the poly-A polymerase enzyme are described as "landmarks in the field". Edmonds also developed the first method to use the poly-A tail to separate mRNA from other nucleic acids, a protocol which forms the beginning of all modern transcriptomics analysis. In the 1980s, Edmonds showed that poly-A RNA is branched, a stage that arises during processing of hnRNA into mRNA. This research led to the development of antibodies targeting branched RNA.

== Selected publications ==
- Edmonds, Mary; Abrams, Richard (April 1960). "Polynucleotide Biosynthesis: Formation of a Sequence of Adenylate Units from Adenosine Triphosphate by an Enzyme from Thymus Nuclei". Journal of Biological Chemistry. 235 (4): 1142–1149. doi:10.1016/s0021-9258(18)69494-3. ISSN 0021-9258.
- Edmonds, M.; Vaughan, M. H.; Nakazato, H. (1 June 1971). "Polyadenylic Acid Sequences in the Heterogeneous Nuclear RNA and Rapidly-Labeled Polyribosomal RNA of HeLa Cells: Possible Evidence for a Precursor Relationship". Proceedings of the National Academy of Sciences. 68 (6): 1336–1340. Bibcode:1971PNAS...68.1336E. doi:10.1073/pnas.68.6.1336. PMC 389184. PMID 5288383.
- Winters, Mary Ann; Edmonds, Mary (July 1973). "A Poly(A) Polymerase from Calf Thymus". Journal of Biological Chemistry. 248 (13): 4756–4762. doi:10.1016/s0021-9258(19)43729-0. ISSN 0021-9258.
- Wallace, John C.; Edmonds, Mary (1 February 1983). "Polyadenylylated nuclear RNA contains branches". Proceedings of the National Academy of Sciences. 80 (4): 950–954. Bibcode:1983PNAS...80..950W. doi:10.1073/pnas.80.4.950. ISSN 0027-8424. PMC 393505. PMID 6573664.
- Edmonds, Mary (2002). "A history of poly A sequences: from formation to factors to function". Progress in Nucleic Acid Research and Molecular Biology. 71: 285–389. doi:10.1016/S0079-6603(02)71046-5. ISBN 9780125400718. PMID 12102557.

== Awards and accolades ==
Edmonds was elected to the National Academy of Sciences in 1991. She was awarded an honorary degree by Lawrence University in 1983, named woman of the year in science by Chatham University in 1986, and received the Chancellor’s Distinguished Research Award Winners from the University of Pittsburgh in 1989. After her death, the University of Pittsburgh established the Mary P. Edmonds Award given each year to a graduate student in recognition of an "outstanding research paper".
