= Paul Sigler =

American biophysicist

Paul B. Sigler
- Born: February 19, 1934; Richmond, Virginia, US
- Died: January 11, 2000 (aged 65); New Haven, Connecticut, US
- Monuments: Memorial plaque on Science Hill (Yale University); Lewis-Sigler Institute for Integrative Genomics at Princeton University
- Occupation: Professor
- Spouse: Althea Jo Martin Sigler
- Children: 5 children
- Scientific career
- Education: Princeton University; Columbia University (MD); Cambridge University (PhD)
- Known for: Phospholipase A2 trp repressor
- Awards: National Academy of Sciences; HHMI Investigator; Guggenheim Fellow; Helen Hay Whitney Fellow
- Fields: Biophysics; Biochemistry
- Workplaces: Yale University; University of Chicago; MRC-LMB; NIH
- Doctoral advisors: David M. Blow
- Website: www.hhmi.org/scientists/paul-b-sigler

Paul B. Sigler (February 19, 1934 – January 11, 2000) was the Henry Ford II Professor of Molecular Biophysics and Biochemistry at Yale University. Major awards included membership in the National Academy of Sciences, HHMI Investigator status, and Guggenheim and Helen Hay Whitney Fellowships. He is noted for pioneering studies of Phospholipase A2 and trp repressor amongst many others.

== Biography ==
Prior to coming to Yale, he was a professor at the University of Chicago. He received his MD from Columbia University in 1959 and his undergraduate degree from Princeton University in 1955. After briefly practicing medicine and working as a researcher for the NIH, he would go on to earn a second doctorate, a PhD, from Cambridge University at the Laboratory of Molecular Biology working under David M. Blow before moving to the University of Chicago.

== Memorials ==
A memorial plaque is located in front of the Bass Center for Structural Biology on Science Hill on the campus of Yale University. Yale has a Paul Sigler Memorial Prize for undergraduate research in Molecular Biophysics & Biochemistry. Yale also has sponsored Paul Sigler memorial symposia in the past. The Agouron Institute sponsored 12 Paul Sigler fellowships between 2000 and 2006.

== Death ==
Paul Sigler died on January 11, 2000, at New Haven, Connecticut, US, about a month before his 66th birthday.

== Selected publications ==
- Lambright, David G.; Sondek, John; Bohm, Andrew; Skiba, Nikolai P.; Hamm, Heidi E.; Sigler, Paul B. (1996). "The 2.0 Å crystal structure of a heterotrimeric G protein". Nature. 379 (6563): 311–9. Bibcode:1996Natur.379..311L. doi:10.1038/379311a0. PMID 8552184. S2CID 4350943.
- Luisi, B. F.; Xu, W. X.; Otwinowski, Z.; Freedman, L. P.; Yamamoto, K. R.; Sigler, P. B. (1991). "Crystallographic analysis of the interaction of the glucocorticoid receptor with DNA". Nature. 352 (6335): 497–505. Bibcode:1991Natur.352..497L. doi:10.1038/352497a0. PMID 1865905. S2CID 1919276.
- Braig, Kerstin; Otwinowski, Zbyszek; Hegde, Rashmi; Boisvert, David C.; Joachimiak, Andrzej; Horwich, Arthur L.; Sigler, Paul B. (1994). "The crystal structure of the bacterial chaperonln GroEL at 2.8 Å". Nature. 371 (6498): 578–86. Bibcode:1994Natur.371..578B. doi:10.1038/371578a0. PMID 7935790. S2CID 4341993.
- Kim, Youngchang; Geiger, James. H.; Hahn, Steven; Sigler, Paul B. (1993). "Crystal structure of a yeast TBP/TATA-box complex". Nature. 365 (6446): 512–20. Bibcode:1993Natur.365..512K. doi:10.1038/365512a0. PMID 8413604. S2CID 4336203.
- Vinson, C.; Sigler, P.; McKnight, S. (1989). "Scissors-grip model for DNA recognition by a family of leucine zipper proteins". Science. 246 (4932): 911–6. Bibcode:1989Sci...246..911V. doi:10.1126/science.2683088. PMID 2683088.
- Otwinowski, Z; Schevitz, R. W.; Zhang, R. G.; Lawson, C. L.; Joachimiak, A; Marmorstein, R. Q.; Luisi, B. F.; Sigler, P. B. (1988). "Crystal structure of trp repressor/operator complex at atomic resolution". Nature. 335 (6188): 321–9. Bibcode:1988Natur.335..321O. doi:10.1038/335321a0. PMID 3419502. S2CID 9358980.

== See also ==
- List of Guggenheim Fellowships awarded in 1974
- List of University of Chicago people
