= Conway (given name) =

Conway is a Welsh, Irish, and Scottish given name, the origin of which is unclear. It may originally have been an Anglicization of Welsh Conwy (derived from Old Welsh cyn "chief" and gwy "water"); of Irish Conbhuidhe or O Connmhachain; or of Scottish Gaelic Mac Conmheadha or Mac Connmhaigh.

Notable people with the name include:

- Conway Baker (1911–1997), American National Football League player
- Conway Barbour (1818–1876), American former slave and Arkansas state legislator
- Conway Berners-Lee (1921–2019), British mathematician and computer scientist
- Conway Elder (1880–1957), Justice of the Supreme Court of Missouri
- Conway Hayman (1949–2020), American former football player and coach
- Conway LeBleu (1918–2007), American politician
- Conway Savage (1960–2018), Australian rock musician
- Conway Tearle (1878–1938), American early film actor
- Conway Twitty (1933–1993), American country music singer
