= Conway High School =

Conway High School may refer to:

- Conway High School (Arkansas) - Conway, Arkansas
- Conway High School (Missouri) - Conway, Missouri
- Conway High School (South Carolina) - Conway, South Carolina
- Conway Springs High School - Conway Springs, Kansas
