= John Abelson =

American molecular biologist

- Born: 19 October 1938 (age 87); Grand Coulee, Washington
- Title: George Beadle Professor of Biology (retired)
- Spouse: Christine Guthrie

Academic background
- Education: Washington State University, Johns Hopkins University

Academic work
- Discipline: Molecular biology
- Sub-discipline: Biophysics; Biochemistry; Genetics
- Institutions: California Institute of Technology; Agouron Institute; University of California, San Diego

John Norman Abelson (born 19 October 1938 in Grand Coulee, Washington) is an American molecular biologist with expertise in biophysics, biochemistry, and genetics. He was a professor at the California Institute of Technology (Caltech).

== Biography ==
Abelson graduated in 1960 with a bachelor's degree in physics from Washington State University. He obtained his Ph.D. in biophysics from Johns Hopkins University in 1965. He then did a postdoctoral fellowship in biochemistry at the MRC Laboratory of Molecular Biology, Molecular Genetics Division, Cambridge, England, where he worked with Sydney Brenner and Francis Crick on the mechanism of nonsense suppressors in E.coli. This work involved both genetics and RNA sequencing (developed at that time by Fred Sanger).

His first faculty position was in the department of chemistry at the University of California, San Diego, in 1968.

In 1978, Abelson and his colleague Mel Simon founded Agouron Institute, a non-profit research organization that sponsors innovative research in biology. He is the president and executive director of the institute.

In 1984, the institute has a substantial endowment because it founded a for-profit-company, Agouron Pharmaceuticals, six years later. This company discovered and brought to market Viracept, a leading drug used for controlling HIV infections. In 1999, the company was bought by Warner Lambert for $2.1 Billion, and in 2000 Warner Lambert was acquired by Pfizer Incorporated. The institute has funded more than $60 million of research in the fields of structural biology, geobiology and microbial ecology.

Abelson was a Guggenheim Fellow for the academic year 1980–1981. In 1982, he joined the faculty at Caltech. He chaired the division of biology there and became the George Beadle Professor of Biology in 1991. He retired in 2002 and lives in San Francisco, where he currently works with his wife, Christine Guthrie, a noted RNA biochemist, geneticist and professor at UCSF.

Abelson was a key figure in the elucidation of RNA splicing, in collaboration with his wife, noted geneticist Christine Guthrie. His work has made possible an understanding of how genomic DNA can be transcribed and the transcripts processed to both messenger RNA and transfer RNA, particularly when there are introns present in the genome. He identified the enzymes that cleave RNA precursors into fragments, and elucidated the mechanisms by which fragments are spliced together to make the functional RNA.

He was elected to the National Academy of Sciences in 1985. The same year Abelson was elected a Fellow of the American Academy of Arts and Sciences. In 2001, he was elected to the American Philosophical Society. He is currently an editor of the influential scientific book series, Methods in Enzymology.

== See also ==
List of RNA biologists

== Note ==
His uncle, Philip Abelson, a physicist, was the longtime editor of Science and his aunt, Neva Martin Abelson co-developed the blood test for Rh factor.
