= Masayasu Nomura =

Japanese molecular biologist

- Born: April 1927; Hyōgo Prefecture, Japan
- Died: November 19, 2011 (aged 84); California, United States
- Awards: NAS Award in Molecular Biology

Academic background
- Education: University of Tokyo

Academic work
- Discipline: Biology
- Sub-discipline: Molecular biology
- Institutions: University of California, Irvine; University of Wisconsin; Osaka University

Masayasu Nomura (野村眞康, Nomura Masayasu; April 1927 – November 19, 2011) was a Japanese molecular biologist.

Nomura was born in April 1927, a native of Hyōgo Prefecture, and completed a bachelor's degree and doctorate at the University of Tokyo. Nomura began work in 1957 as a postdoctoral researcher in the United States, alongside Sol Spiegelman, James Watson, and Seymour Benzer. Nomura returned to Japan in 1960, to teach at the Osaka University Institute of Protein Research. Three years later, Nomura accepted a position at the University of Wisconsin–Madison. He was named a full professor in 1966, and remained on the faculty until 1984, when he moved to the University of California, Irvine as Grace Bell Professor of Biological Chemistry. Awarded the NAS Award in Molecular Biology in 1971, Nomura gained membership into the National Academy of Sciences itself in 1978. He was also a member of the American Academy of Arts and Sciences, and the American Academy of Microbiology, as well as the Royal Netherlands Academy of Arts and Sciences and Danish Academy of Sciences and Letters. Nomura died in California on 19 November 2011, aged 84.
