= Steroids (journal) =

- Discipline: Endocrinology
- Language: English
- Edited by: R.B. Hochberg, W. Rosner

Publication details
- History: 1963-present
- Publisher: Elsevier
- Frequency: Monthly
- Impact factor: 2.716 (2013)

Standard abbreviations
- ISO 4: Steroids

Indexing
- CODEN: STEDAM
- ISSN: 0039-128X
- LCCN: 64007007
- OCLC no.: 1766506

Links
- Journal homepage; Online archive

Steroids is a monthly peer-reviewed international scientific journal covering all aspects of steroid hormones, such as biological aspects of steroidal moieties.

It was established in 1963 and is published by Elsevier. The editors-in-chief are R.B. Hochberg (Yale University) and W. Rosner (Mount Sinai Morningside). According to the Journal Citation Reports, the journal has a 2013 impact factor of 2.716.
