= Michael E. O'Donnell =

American biochemist

Michael E. O’ Donnell
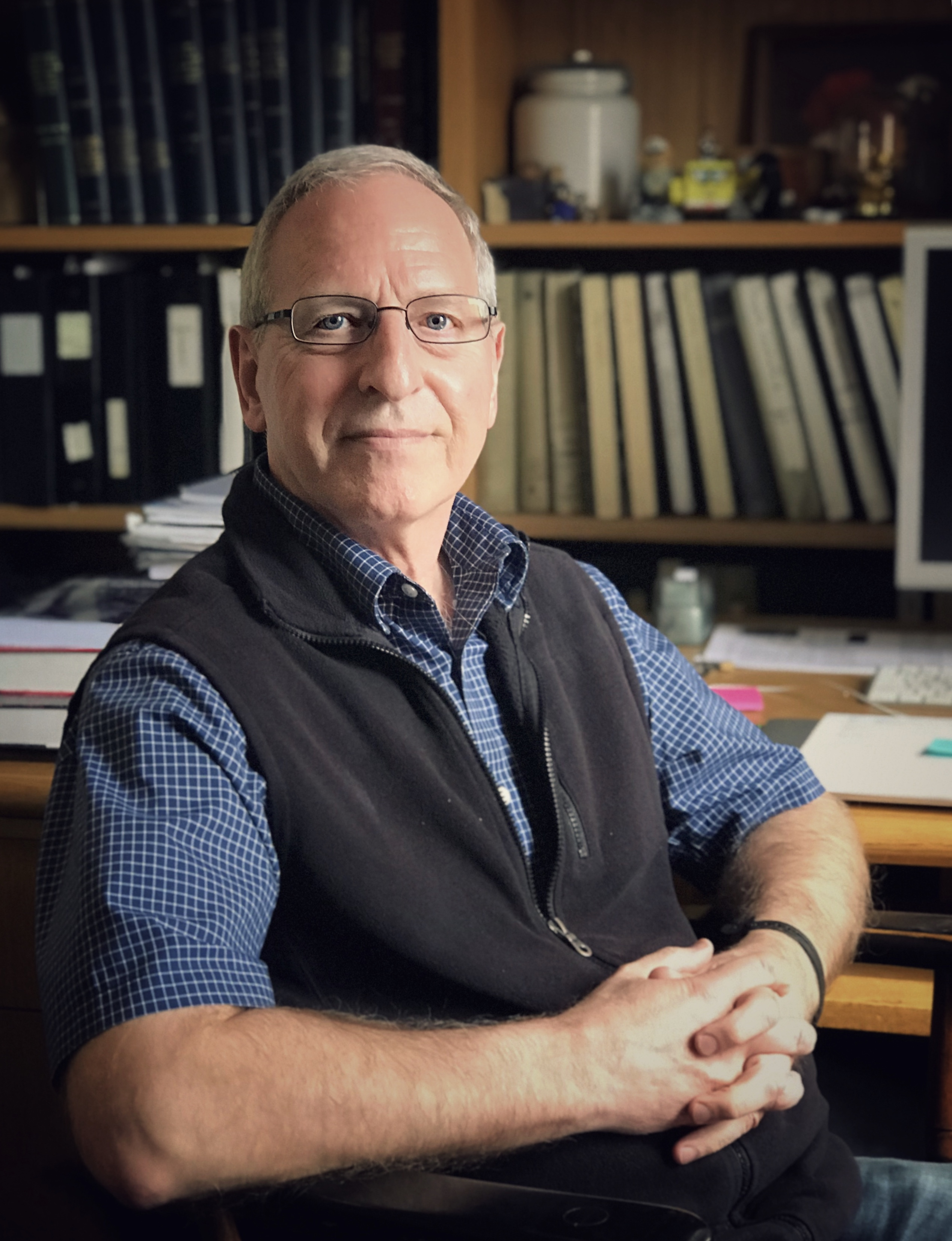
- Education: University of Portland (BS); University of Michigan (PhD)
- Awards: Howard Hughes Medical Institute Investigator; National Academy of Sciences member
- Scientific career
- Workplaces: Weill Cornell Medical College; The Rockefeller University
- Website: odonnell.rockefeller.edu; www.hhmi.org/scientists/michael-e-odonnell

Michael E. O’ Donnell is an American biochemist and a professor at the Rockefeller University specializing in the field of DNA replication.

== Education ==
O’ Donnell attended the University of Portland, receiving his B.S in 1975. During his subsequent graduate studies at the University of Michigan, he became trained as an enzymologist; he earned his Ph.D. in biochemistry in 1982. O'Donnell continued with his postdoctoral training at Stanford University under the supervision of nobel laureate Arthur Kornberg and I. Robert Lehman in the field of nucleic acid enzymology.

== Research and career ==
In 1986, O'Donnell started his own lab at Cornell University Medical College. In 1996, he moved his lab to Rockefeller University. The goal of his research focuses on elucidating the mechanism of the proteins involved in DNA replication. His approach involves studying both the biochemical activities of these proteins as well as their physical structures. Most notably, O'Donnell discovered the first known ring-shaped protein that encircles DNA for function referred to as a DNA-sliding clamp. The DNA clamp tethers the DNA polymerase to its DNA template thereby allowing the polymerase to efficiently synthesize long genomes without letting go. In collaboration with John Kuriyan, they determined the structures of the bacterial beta clamp and human PCNA clamp showing that they form rings that are nearly superimposable and thus they likely share a common ancestor. His work on the many enzymes involved in duplicating DNA has spanned from bacterial to eukaryotic systems.

== Awards and honors ==
O'Donnell became an investigator with the Howard Hughes Medical Institute in 1990. He was then elected to the United States National Academy of Sciences in 2006. Rockefeller University appointed him the Anthony and Judith Evnin Professor in 2008.
