= Wei Yang (biologist) =

American biologist

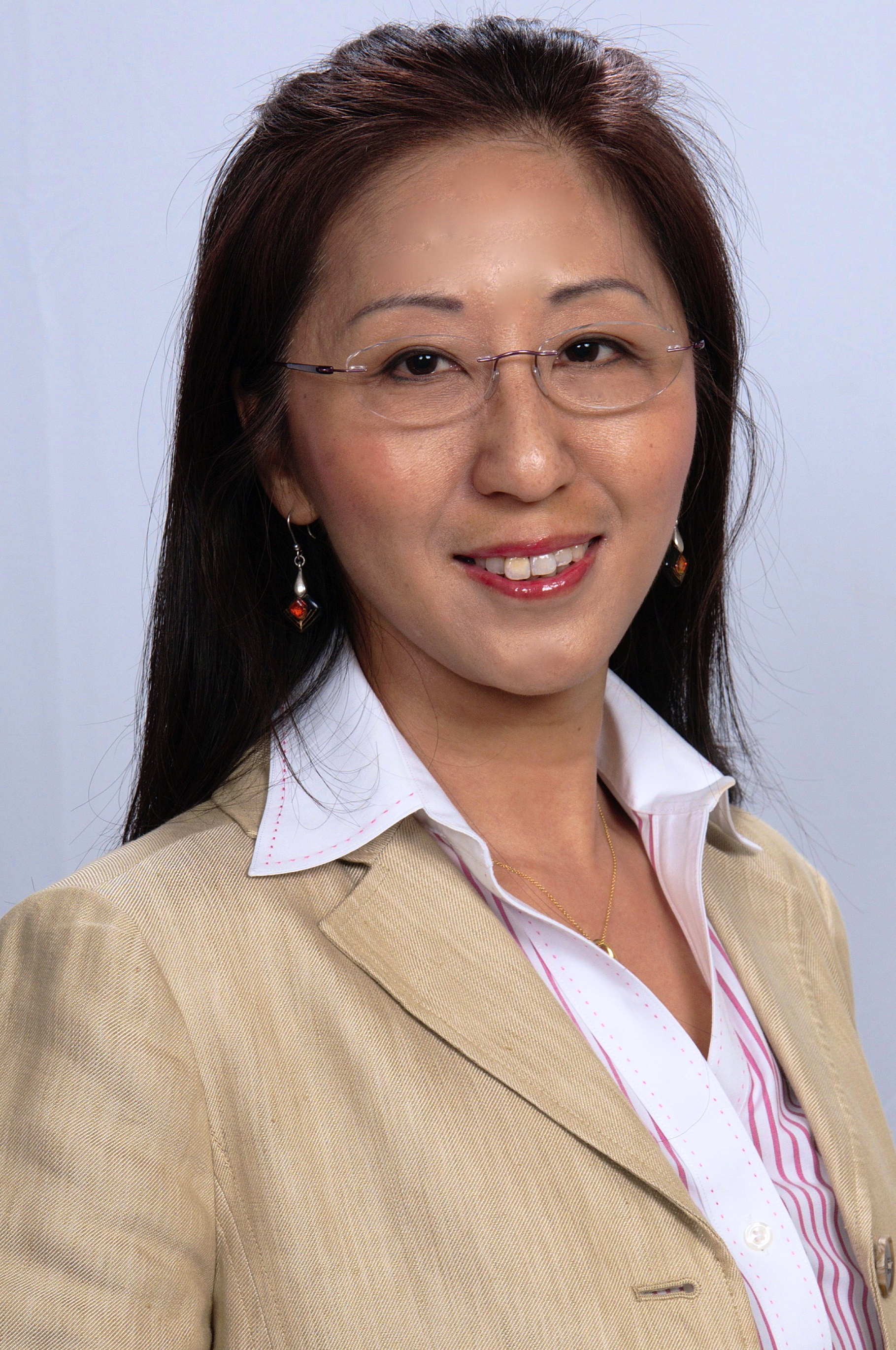
Wei Yang

Wei Yang (Chinese: 杨薇; pinyin: Yáng Wēi; born 1963) is a Chinese-American structural biologist. She is a distinguished investigator at the National Institutes of Health and was elected a member of the US National Academy of Sciences in 2013.

== Early life and education ==
Yang was born in Shanghai, China in 1963. She entered Fudan University in 1980, before transferring to Stony Brook University in the United States in 1983, where she earned her B.A. degree. She earned her M.A. (1985) and Ph.D. (1991) in Biochemistry & Molecular Biophysics from Columbia University.

== Career and research ==
Since 1995 she has been a senior scientist in the Laboratory of Molecular Biology at the National Institutes of Health. Her research mainly focuses on DNA mismatch repair, translesion synthesis, and V(D)J recombination. Her lab discovered that DNA synthesis and RNA degradation reactions are propelled by cation trafficking and require transiently bound Mg²⁺ and K⁺ ions that are absent in the static structures of substrate- or product-enzyme complexes.

== Awards and honors ==
In 2011, the Protein Society honored Yang with the Dorothy Crowfoot Hodgkin Award. She was elected a member of the National Academy of Sciences in 2013 and a fellow of the American Academy of Arts and Sciences in 2015. She has naturalized as a US citizen.
