= Horace Barker =

American biochemist and microbiologist

- Born: Horace Albert Barker; November 29, 1907; Oakland, California, US
- Died: December 24, 2000 (aged 93); Berkeley, California, US
- Education: Stanford University (B.S., 1929) (Ph.D., 1933)
- Spouse: Margaret McDowell Barker
- Awards: National Medal of Science (1968)
- Scientific career
- Fields: Biochemistry; Microbiology
- Workplaces: University of California, Berkeley
- Thesis: The chemistry of egg-albumin with special reference to the phenomenon of heat denaturation (1933)
- Doctoral advisor: James William McBain
- Other academic advisors: C. B. van Niel; Albert Kluyver

Horace Albert "Nook" Barker (November 29, 1907 – December 24, 2000) was an American biochemist and microbiologist who studied the operation of biological and chemical processes in plants, humans and other animals, including using radioactive tracers to determine the role enzymes play in synthesizing sucrose. He was recognized with the National Medal of Science for his role in identifying an active form of Vitamin B_{12}.

== Early life and education ==
Barker was born on November 29, 1907, in Oakland, California. He moved with his family to Palo Alto, California when he was 11 years old. He spent a year in Germany following high school, learning the German language and absorbing its culture. He attended Stanford University, graduating in 1929 with a bachelor's degree in physical science, and was awarded a Ph.D. in chemistry in 1933.

After graduating from Stanford, he performed a two-year postgraduate fellowship at the Hopkins Marine Station under the supervision of microbiologist C. B. van Niel, who fostered Barker's interest in botany and taught him techniques for isolating microorganisms. He then spent a year at the Delft Microbiology Laboratory in the Netherlands under Albert Kluyver.

== University of California ==
Barker was hired in 1936 by the University of California, Berkeley to teach soil microbiology. He was part of a team that developed the use of Carbon-14 as a radioactive tracer, using the technique in 1944 to show how sucrose is synthesized in living cells by enzymes.

Research led by Barker during the 1950s provided insights into the uses of vitamin B_{12} in the body using bacterium he had isolated from mud taken from San Francisco Bay. By 1959, through documenting the metabolic flow of the vitamin B_{12} coenzyme, Barker was able to show its role in the body, helping to explain various diseases, such as pernicious anemia, one of a series of conditions resulting from [[vitamin B_{12} deficiency]]. In a White House ceremony held on January 17, 1969, U.S. President Lyndon Johnson awarded Barker with the National Medal of Science "[f]or his profound study of the chemical activities of microorganisms, including the unraveling of fatty acid metabolism and the discovery of the active coenzyme form of vitamin B_{12}."

When the department of biochemistry was established in 1959, he was named as a professor there. He served as the department's chairman in the 1960s, and continued work there for more than a decade after retiring in 1975 when he became an emeritus professor. In 1953, he was elected a member of the United States National Academy of Sciences. He was elected a Fellow of the American Academy of Arts and Sciences in 1967.

== Personal ==
A resident of Berkeley, California, Barker died at age 93 on December 24, 2000, due to heart failure at his home there. He had been married for 62 years to his wife, the former Margaret McDowell, at the time of her death in 1995.

== Eponyms ==
- Methanosarcina barkeri Schnellen 1947

== Research resources ==
- Horace Albert Barker Papers, 1933-1992, The Bancroft Library
