= American Society for Biochemistry and Molecular Biology =

American learned society

- Founded: December 26th, 1906
- Founder: John Jacob Abel
- Location: Rockville, Maryland
- Members: 12,000
- Key people: Toni M. Antalis: President; Joan W. Conaway: Treasurer; Wei Yang: Secretary
- Employees: 41
- Website: asbmb.org

The American Society for Biochemistry and Molecular Biology (ASBMB) is a learned society that was founded on December 26, 1906, at a meeting organized by John Jacob Abel (Johns Hopkins University). The roots of the society were in the American Physiological Society, which had been formed some 20 years earlier. ASBMB is the US member of the International Union of Biochemistry and Molecular Biology.

The ASBMB was originally called the American Society of Biological Chemists, before obtaining its current name in 1987. The society is based in Rockville, Maryland. ASBMB's mission is to advance the science of biochemistry and molecular biology through publication of scientific and educational journals, the organization of scientific meetings, advocacy for funding of basic research and education, support of science education at all levels, and by promoting the diversity of individuals entering the scientific workforce. The organization currently has over 12,000 members.

== Publications ==
The American Society for Biochemistry and Molecular Biology publishes three research journals and a monthly magazine covering society news and activity updates. ASBMB journals are peer-reviewed and cover research in the fields of microbiology, molecular genetics, RNA-related research, proteomics, genomics, transcription, peptides, cell signaling, lipidomics, and systems biology. All articles are published online as "Papers in Press" upon acceptance. As of January 2021, all three ASBMB journals are fully open access.

- The Journal of Biological Chemistry publishes research in any area of biochemistry or molecular biology in one online-only issue per week.
- Molecular & Cellular Proteomics is a monthly online only publication. Articles appearing in MCP "...describe the structural and functional properties of proteins and their expression, particularly with respect to the developmental time courses of the organism of which they are a part." The journal also publishes other content such as "HUPO views" (reports from the Human Proteome Organization), proceedings from HUPO meetings, and the proceedings of the International Symposium On Mass Spectrometry In The Life Sciences.
- The Journal of Lipid Research covers "...the science of lipids in health and disease. The Journal emphasizes lipid function and the biochemical and genetic regulation of lipid metabolism. In addition, JLR publishes manuscripts on patient-oriented and epidemiological research relating to altered lipid metabolism, including modification of dietary lipids."
- ASBMB Today is the society's monthly news magazine. It contains extensive coverage of awards, meetings, research highlights, job placement advertising and human interest articles. All ASBMB members receive a complimentary subscription to ASBMB Today. The online version of the magazine features daily publishing.

== Meetings ==
ASBMB hosts and sponsors numerous meetings each year. The annual meeting is held each April in conjunction with the Experimental Biology meeting. Additionally, themed special symposia are organized throughout the year. The society also produces webinars throughout the year focused on topics related to scientific research, professional development and education.

== Awards ==
The society offers twenty-five different awards, grants, and scholarships.

=== Annual Awards ===
- ASBMB Award for Exemplary Contributions to Education
- ASBMB Leadership Awards
- ASBMB–Merck Award
- ASBMB Young Investigator Award
- Avanti Award in Lipids
- Bert and Natalie Vallee Award in Biomedical Science
- DeLano Award for Computational Biosciences
- Earl and Thressa Stadtman Distinguished Scientist Award
- Earl and Thressa Stadtman Young Scholar Award
- Herbert Tabor Research Award
- Mildred Cohn Award in Biological Chemistry - The Mildred Cohn Award in Biological Chemistry was established in 2013 to honor the scientific achievements of Mildred Cohn. Cohn was the first female president of the society, in 1978. The award of $5,000 is presented annually to a scientist who has made substantial advances in understanding biological chemistry using innovative physical approaches. The recipient is expected to deliver the Mildred Cohn Award lecture at the annual meeting.
- Ruth Kirschstein Diversity in Science Award
- The Alice and C. C. Wang Award in Molecular Parasitology
- Walter A. Shaw Young Investigator Award in Lipid Research
- William C. Rose Award

=== Student Chapter Awards ===
- ASBMB Student Chapters Regional Meeting Award
- Outstanding Chapter Award
- Student Chapter Outreach Grant
- ASBMB Undergraduate Research Award
- Student Chapters Award

=== Other awards ===
- Marion B. Sewer Distinguished Scholarship for Undergraduates
- Promoting Research Opportunities for Latin American Biochemists
- ASBMB Science Fair Award

== Recipients of Mildred Cohn Award ==
- 2023 - Anne Kenworthy
- 2022 - Janet Smith
- 2021 - Carol Fierke
- 2019 - Angela Gronenborn
- 2018 – Leemor Joshua-Tor
- 2017 – Wei Yang
- 2016 – Eva Nogales
- 2015 – Judith P. Klinman
- 2014 – Lila M. Gierasch
- 2013 – Jennifer A. Doudna

== Advocacy ==
The Public Affairs Office works with the PAAC to advocate for increased research budgets for the major governmental funding agencies, primarily the National Institutes of Health and the National Science Foundation. ASBMB has developed a set of recommendations for pre-medical course requirements consistent with the new Medical College Admission Test. Advocacy efforts also focus on protecting the conditions that promote a successful research environment. In addition, the office works to maintain a healthy relationship between ASBMB members, government officials, and the public in order to foster awareness of the importance of science to everyday life.

As part of their advocacy efforts, ASBMB organizes Capitol Hill Day, an annual event that allows graduate students and trainees to meet their congressional representatives in Washington, D.C.

== See also ==
- List of biochemistry awards

== See also ==
- Belgian Society of Biochemistry and Molecular Biology
- International Union of Biochemistry and Molecular Biology
