= Metallothionein =

Family of proteins

Metallothionein superfamily (plant)
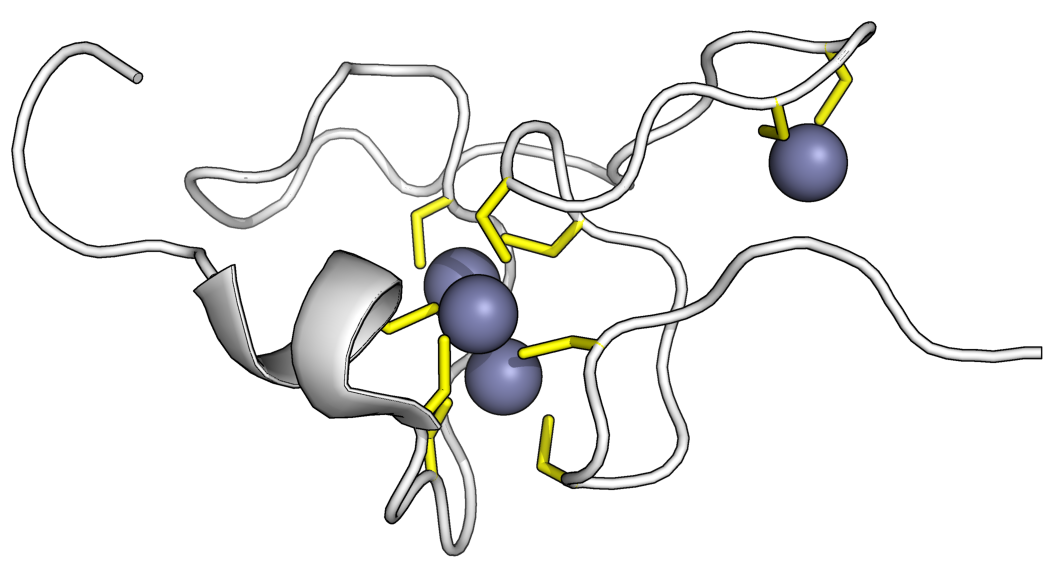
- Beta-E-domain of wheat Ec-1 metallothionein bound to zinc ions. Cysteines in yellow, zinc in purple. (PDB: 2KAK)

Identifiers
- Symbol: Metallothionein_sfam
- Pfam: PF00131
- InterPro: IPR003019
Available protein structures:
- PDB: PDB: 1dfs PDB: 1dft PDB: 1dmc PDB: 1dmd PDB: 1dme PDB: 1dmf PDB: 1j5l PDB: 1j5m PDB: 1ji9 PDB: 1m0g IPR003019 PF00131 (ECOD; PDBsum)
- AlphaFold: IPR003019; PF00131

Yeast MT
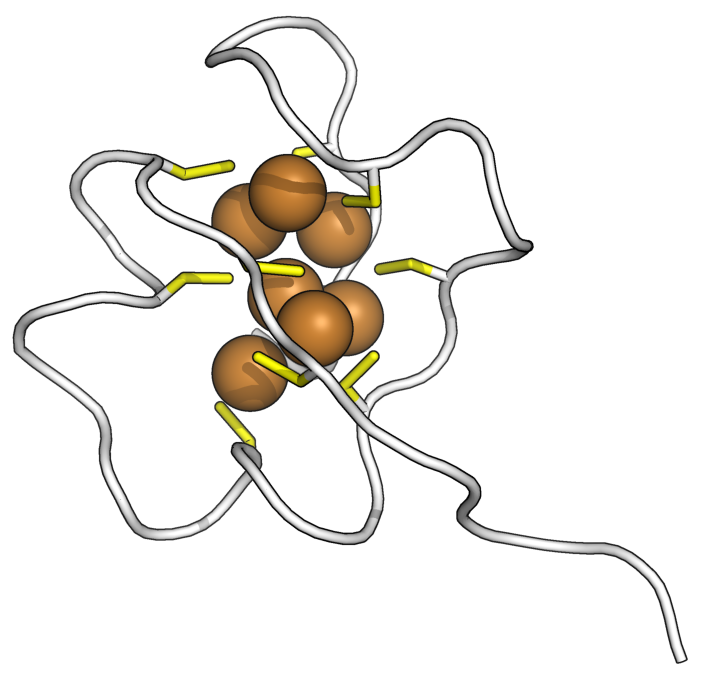
- Saccharomyces cerevisiae MT metallothionein bound to copper ions. Cysteines in yellow, copper in brown. (PDB: 1AQS)

Identifiers
- Symbol: Yeast metallothionein
- Pfam: PF11403
- Pfam clan: CL0461
- InterPro: IPR022710
Available protein structures:
- PDB: IPR022710 PF11403 (ECOD; PDBsum)
- AlphaFold: IPR022710; PF11403

Cyanobacterial SmtA
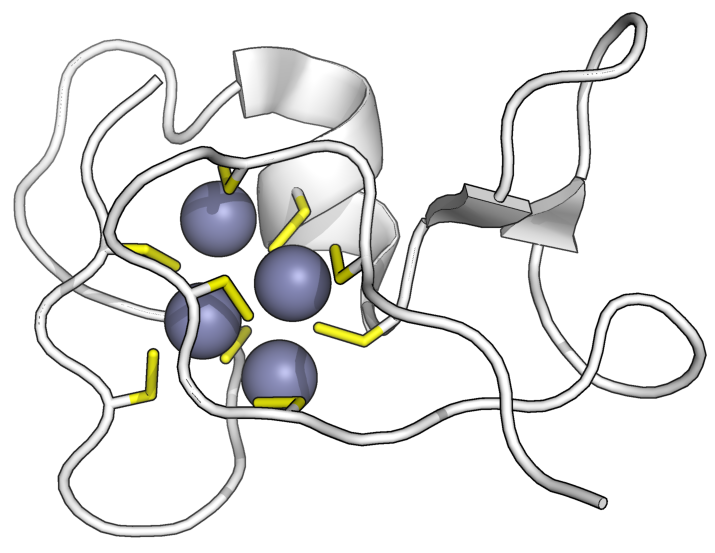
- Cyanobacterial SmtA metallothionein bound to zinc ions. Cysteines in yellow, zinc in purple. (PDB: 1JJD)

Identifiers
- Symbol: Bacterial metallothionein
- Pfam: PF02069
- Pfam clan: CL0461
- InterPro: IPR000518
Available protein structures:
- PDB: IPR000518 PF02069 (ECOD; PDBsum)
- AlphaFold: IPR000518; PF02069

Metallothionein (MT) is a family of cysteine-rich, low molecular weight (MW ranging from 500 to 14000 Da) proteins. They are localized to the membrane of the Golgi apparatus. MTs have the capacity to bind both physiological (such as zinc, copper, selenium) and xenobiotic (such as cadmium, mercury, silver, arsenic, lead) heavy metals through the thiol group of its cysteine residues, which represent nearly 30% of its constituent amino acid residues.

MT was discovered in 1957 by Vallee and Margoshe from purification of a cadmium-binding protein from horse (equine) renal cortex. MT plays a role in the protection against metal toxicity and oxidative stress, and is involved in zinc and copper regulation. There are four main isoforms expressed in humans (family 1, see chart below): MT1 (subtypes A, B, E, F, G, H, L, M, X), MT2, MT3, and MT4. In the human body, large quantities are synthesised primarily in the liver and kidneys. Their production is dependent on availability of the dietary minerals such as zinc, copper, and selenium, as well as the amino acids histidine and cysteine.

Metallothioneins are rich in thiols, causing them to bind a number of trace metals. Metallothionein is one of the few eukaryotic proteins playing a substantial role in metal detoxification. Zinc and cadmium are tetrahedrally coordinated to cysteine residues, and each metallothionein protein molecule may bind up to 7 atoms of Zn or Cd. The biosynthesis of metallothionein appears to increase several-fold during periods of oxidative stress to shield the cells against cytotoxicity and DNA damage. Metallothionein biosynthesis can also be induced by certain hormones, pharmaceuticals, alcohols, and other compounds. Metallothionein expression is upregulated during fetal development, particularly in liver tissue.

== Structure and classification ==
Metallothioneins are present in a vast range of organisms, ranging from prokaryotes (such as the cyanobacteria Synechococcus sp.), protozoa (such as the ciliate Tetrahymena genera), plants (such as Pisum sativum, Triticum durum, Zea mays, or Quercus suber), yeast (such as Saccharomyces cerevisiae, Candida albicans, or Neurospora crassa), invertebrates (such as the nematode Caenorhabditis elegans, the insect Drosophila melanogaster, the mollusc Mytilus edulis, or the echinoderm Strongylocentrotus purpuratus) and vertebrates (such as the chicken Gallus gallus, or the mammalian Homo sapiens or Mus musculus).

The MTs from this diverse taxonomic range represent a high-heterogeneity sequence (regarding molecular weight and number and distribution of Cys residues) and do not show general homology; in spite of this, homology is found inside some taxonomic groups (such as vertebrate MTs).

From their primary structure, MTs have been classified by different methods. The first one dates from 1987, when Fowler et al., established three classes of MTs: Class I, including the MTs which show homology with horse MT, Class II, including the rest of the MTs with no homology with horse MT, and Class III, which includes phytochelatins, Cys-rich enzymatically synthesised peptides. The second classification was performed by Binz and Kagi in 2001, and takes into account taxonomic parameters and the patterns of distribution of Cys residues along the MT sequence. It results in a classification of 15 families for proteinaceous MTs. Family 15 contains the plant MTs, which in 2002 have been further classified by Cobbet and Goldsbrough into 4 Types (1, 2, 3 and 4) depending on the distribution of their Cys residues and a Cys-devoid regions (called spacers) characteristic of plant MTs.

A table including the principal aspects of the two latter classifications is included.

Family	Name	Sequence pattern	Example
1	Vertebrate	K-x(1,2)-C-C-x-C-C-P-x(2)-C	Mus musculus MT1; MDPNCSCTTGGSCACAGSCKCKECKCTSCKKCCSCCPVGCAKCAQGCVCKGSSEKCRCCA
2	Molluscan	C-x-C-x(3)-C-T-G-x(3)-C-x-C-x(3)-C-x-C-K	Mytilus edulis 10MTIV; MPAPCNCIETNVCICDTGCSGEGCRCGDACKCSGADCKCSGCKVVCKCSGSCACEGGCTGPSTCKCAPGCSCK
3	Crustacean	P-[GD]-P-C-C-x(3,4)-C-x-C	Homarus americanus MTH; MPGPCCKDKCECAEGGCKTGCKCTSCRCAPCEKCTSGCKCPSKDECAKTCSKPCKCCP
4	Echinoderms	P-D-x-K-C-V-C-C-x(5)-C-x-C-x(4)-C-C-x(4)-C-C-x(4,6)-C-C	Strongylocentrotus purpuratus SpMTA; MPDVKCVCCKEGKECACFGQDCCKTGECCKDGTCCGICTNAACKCANGCKCGSGCSCTEGNCAC
5	Diptera	C-G-x(2)-C-x-C-x(2)-Q-x(5)-C-x-C-x(2)D-C-x-C	Drosophila melanogaster MTNB; MVCKGCGTNCQCSAQKCGDNCACNKDCQCVCKNGPKDQCCSNK
6	Nematoda	K-C-C-x(3)-C-C	Caenorhabditis elegans MT1; MACKCDCKNKQCKCGDKCECSGDKCCEKYCCEEASEKKCCPAGCKGDCKCANCHCAEQKQCGDKTHQHQGTAAAH
7	Ciliate	x-C-C-C-x ?	Tetrahymena thermophila MTT1; MDKVNSCCCGVNAKPCCTDPNSGCCCVSKTDNCCKSDTKECCTGTGEGCKCVNCKCCKPQANCCCGVNAKPCCFDPNSGCCCVSKTNNCCKSD TKECCTGTGEGCKCTSCQCCKPVQQGCCCGDKAKACCTDPNSGCCCSNKANKCCDATSKQECQTCQCCK
8	Fungal 1	C-G-C-S-x(4)-C-x-C-x(3,4)-C-x-C-S-x-C	Neurospora crassa MT; MGDCGCSGASSCNCGSGCSCSNCGSK
9	Fungal 2	—	Candida glabrata MT2; MANDCKCPNGCSCPNCANGGCQCGDKCECKKQSCHGCGEQCKCGSHGSSCHGSCGCGDKCECK
10	Fungal 3	—	Candida glabrata MT2; MPEQVNCQYDCHCSNCACENTCNCCAKPACACTNSASNECSCQTCKCQTCKC
11	Fungal 4	C-X-K-C-x-C-x(2)-C-K-C	Yarrowia lipolytica MT3; MEFTTAMLGASLISTTSTQSKHNLVNNCCCSSSTSESSMPASCACTKCGCKTCKC
12	Fungal 5	—	Saccharomyces cerevisiae CUP1; MFSELINFQNEGHECQCQCGSCKNNEQCQKSCSCPTGCNSDDKCPCGNKSEETKKSCCSGK
13	Fungal 6	—	Saccharomyces cerevisiae CRS5; TVKICDCEGECCKDSCHCGSTCLPSCSGGEKCKCDHSTGSPQCKSCGEKCKCETTCTCEKSKCNCEKC
14	Procaryota	K-C-A-C-x(2)-C-L-C	Synechococcus sp SmtA; MTTVTQMKCACPHCLCIVSLNDAIMVDGKPYCSEVCANGTCKENSGCGHAGCGCGSA
15	Plant	[YFH]-x(5,25)-C-[SKD]-C-[GA]-[SDPAT]-x(0,1)-C-x-[CYF]	
15.1	Plant MTs Type 1	C-X-C-X(3)- C-X-C-X(3)- C-X-C-X(3)-spacer-C-X-C-X(3)- C-X-C-X(3)- C-X-C-X(3)	Pisum sativum MT; MSGCGCGSSCNCGDSCKCNKRSSGLSYSEMETTETVILGVGPAKIQFEGAEMSAASEDGGCKCGDNCTCDPCNCK
15.2	Plant MTs Type 2	C-C-X(3)-C-X-C-X(3)- C-X-C-X(3)- C-X-C-X(3)-spacer- C-X-C-X(3)- C-X-C-X(3)- C-X-C-X(3)	Lycopersicon esculentum MT; MSCCGGNCGCGSSCKCGNGCGGCKMYPDMSYTESSTTTETLVLGVGPEKTSFGAMEMGESPVAENGCKCGSDCKCNPCTCSK
15.3	Plant MTs Type 3	—	Arabidopsis thaliana MT3; MSSNCGSCDCADKTQCVKKGTSYTFDIVETQESYKEAMIMDVGAEENNANCKCKCGSSCSCVNCTCCPN
15.4	Plant MTs Type 4 or Ec	C-x(4)-C-X-C-X(3)-C-X(5)-C-X-C-X(9,11)-HTTCGCGEHC- X-C-X(20)-CSCGAXCNCASC-X(3,5)	Triticum aestivum MT; MGCNDKCGCAVPCPGGTGCRCTSARSDAAAGEHTTCGCGEHCGCNPCACGREGTPSGRANRRANCSCGAACNCASCGSTTA
99	Phytochelatins and other non-proteinaceous MT-like polypeptides	—	Schizosaccharomyces pombe γEC-γEC-γECG

More data on this classification are discoverable at the Expasy metallothionein page.

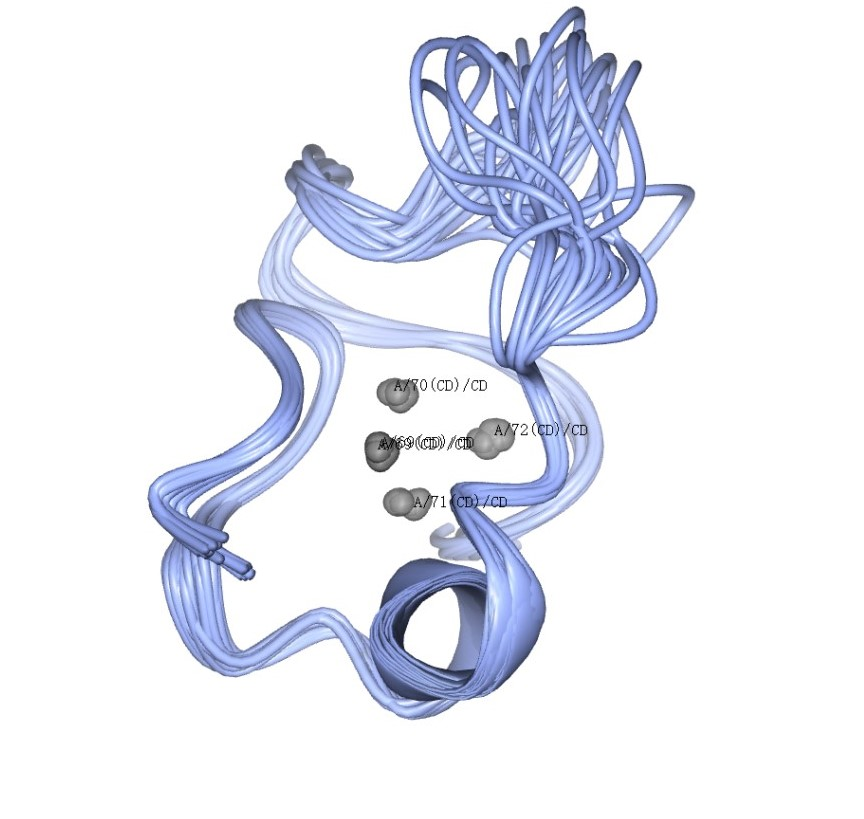
Structure of a-domain of human metallothionein-3

Secondary structure elements have been observed in several MTs SmtA from Syneccochoccus, mammalian MT3, echinoderm SpMTA, fish Notothenia coriiceps MT, crustacean MTH, but until this moment, the content of such structures is considered to be poor in MTs, and its functional influence is not considered.

Tertiary structure of MTs is also highly heterogeneous. While vertebrate, echinoderm and crustacean MTs show a bidominial structure with divalent metals as Zn(II) or Cd(II) (the protein is folded so as to bind metals in two functionally independent domains, with a metallic cluster each), yeast and prokaryotic MTs show a monodominial structure (one domain with a single metallic cluster). In yeast, the first 40 residues in the protein wrap around the metal by forming two large parallel loops separated by a deep cleft containing the metal cluster. Although no structural data is available for molluscan, nematoda and Drosophila MTs, it is commonly assumed that the former are bidominial and the latter monodominial. No conclusive data are available for Plant MTs, but two possible structures have been proposed: 1) a bidominial structure similar to that of vertebrate MTs; 2) a codominial structure, in which two Cys-rich domains interact to form a single metallic cluster.

Quaternary structure has not been broadly considered for MTs. Dimerization and oligomerization processes have been observed and attributed to several molecular mechanisms, including intermolecular disulfide formation, bridging through metals bound by either Cys or His residues on different MTs, or inorganic phosphate-mediated interactions. Dimeric and polymeric MTs have been shown to acquire novel properties upon metal detoxification, but the physiological significance of these processes has been demonstrated only in the case of prokaryotic Synechococcus SmtA. The MT dimer produced by this organism forms structures similar to zinc fingers and has Zn-regulatory activity.

Metallothioneins have diverse metal-binding preferences, which have been associated with functional specificity. As an example, the mouse MT1 preferentially binds divalent metal ions (Zn(II), Cd(II),...), while yeast CUP1 is selective for monovalent metal ions (Cu(I), Ag(I),...). Strictly metal-selective MTs with metal-specific physiological functions were discovered by Dallinger et al. (1997) in pulmonate snails (Gastropoda, Mollusca). The Roman snail (Helix pomatia), for example, possesses a Cd-selective (CdMT) and a Cu-selective isoform (CuMT) involved in Cd detoxification and Cu regulation, respectively. While both isoforms contain unvaried numbers and positions of Cys residues responsible for metal ligation, metal selectivity is apparently achieved by sequence modulation of amino acid residues not directly involved in metal binding (Palacios et al. 2011).

A novel functional classification of MTs as Zn- or Cu-thioneins is currently being developed based on these functional preferences.

== Function ==
The main biological function of metallothioneins is to maintain homeostasis of the essential metals zinc and copper, but metallothioneins also protect against metal toxicity and oxidative stress.

=== Metal binding ===
Metallothionein has been documented to bind a wide range of metals including cadmium, lead, zinc, mercury, copper, arsenic, silver, etc. Metalation of MT was previously reported to occur cooperatively but recent reports have provided strong evidence that metal-binding occurs via a sequential, noncooperative mechanism. The observation of partially metalated MT (that is, having some free metal binding capacity) suggest that these species are biologically important.

Metallothioneins likely participate in the uptake, transport, and regulation of zinc in biological systems. Mammalian MT binds three Zn(II) ions in its beta domain and four in the alpha domain. Cysteine is a sulfur-containing amino acid, hence the name "-thionein". However, the participation of inorganic sulfide and chloride ions has been proposed for some MT forms. In some MTs, mostly bacterial, histidine participates in zinc binding. By binding and releasing zinc, metallothioneins (MTs) may regulate zinc levels within the body. Zinc, in turn, is a key element for the activation and binding of certain transcription factors through its participation in the zinc finger region of the protein. Metallothionein also carries zinc ions (signals) from one part of the cell to another. When zinc enters a cell, it can be picked up by thionein (which thus becomes "metallothionein") and carried to another part of the cell where it is released to another organelle or protein. In this way thionein and metallothionein becomes a key component of the zinc signaling system in cells. This system is particularly important in the brain, where zinc signaling is prominent both between and within nerve cells. It also seems to be important for the regulation of the tumor suppressor protein p53.

=== Control of oxidative stress ===
Cysteine residues from MTs can capture harmful oxidant radicals like the superoxide and hydroxyl radicals. In this reaction, cysteine is oxidized to cystine, and the metal ions which were bound to cysteine are liberated to the media. As explained in the Expression and regulation section, this Zn can activate the synthesis of more MTs. This mechanism has been proposed to be an important mechanism in the control of the oxidative stress by MTs. The role of MTs in reducing oxidative stress has been confirmed by MT Knockout mutants, but some experiments propose also a prooxidant role for MTs.

In mammalian cells, spontaneous mutagenesis is caused to a large extent by oxidative DNA damage, and the occurrence of such damage can be blocked by metallothionein.

Metallothionein also plays a role in hematopoietic cell differentiation and proliferation, as well as prevention of apoptosis of early differentiated cells. Induced MT levels were adversely associated with sensitivity to etoposide-induced apoptosis, signifying that MT is a potential negative controller of apoptosis.

== Expression and regulation ==
Metallothionein gene expression is induced by a high variety of stimuli, as metal exposure, oxidative stress, glucocorticoids, vitamin D, hydric stress, fasting, exercise, etc. Beta-hydroxylbutyration of histone proteins upregulates MT2. The level of the response to these inducers depends on the MT gene. MT genes present in their promoters specific sequences for the regulation of the expression, elements as metal response elements (MRE), glucocorticoid response elements (GRE), GC-rich boxes, basal level elements (BLE), and thyroid response elements (TRE).

== Metallothionein and disease ==
=== Cancer ===
Because MTs play an important role in transcription factor regulation, defects in MT function or expression may lead to malignant transformation of cells and ultimately cancer. Studies have found increased expression of MTs in some cancers of the breast, colon, kidney, liver, skin (melanoma), lung, nasopharynx, ovary, prostate, mouth, salivary gland, testes, thyroid and urinary bladder; they have also found lower levels of MT expression in hepatocellular carcinoma and liver adenocarcinoma.

Evidence suggests that greater MT expression may cause resistance to chemotherapy.

=== Autism ===
Heavy metal toxicity has been proposed as a hypothetical etiology of autism, and dysfunction of MT synthesis and activity may play a role in this. Many heavy metals, including mercury, lead, and arsenic have been linked to symptoms that resemble the neurological symptoms of autism. However, MT dysfunction has not specifically been linked to autistic spectrum disorders. A 2006 study, investigating children exposed to the vaccine preservative thiomersal, found that levels of MT and antibodies to MT in autistic children did not differ significantly from non-autistic children.

A low zinc to copper ratio has been seen as a biomarker for autism and suggested as an indication that the metallothionein system has been affected.

Further, there is indication that the mother's zinc levels may affect the developing baby's immunological state that may lead to autism and could be again an indication that the metallothionein system has been affected.

=== Cardiovascular disease ===
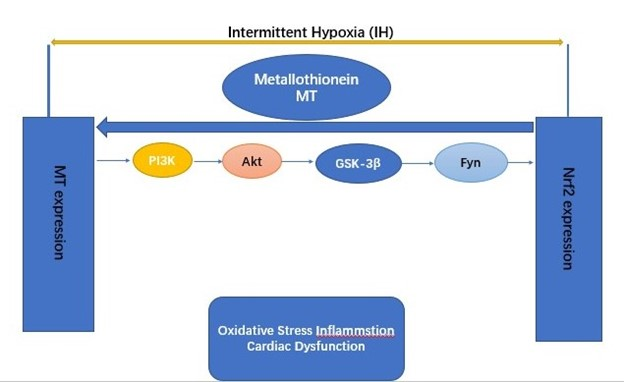
Mechanism of Nrf2 and MT in preventing IH-induced cardiac injury

Metallothionein (MT) is an indirect redox balance regulator which regulates nuclear factor red blood cell 2-related factor 2 (Nrf2) in the body. However, MT plays an important role in the anti-injury protection of the cardiovascular system, mainly in its inhibitory effect on ischemia-reperfusion injury. Also, the MT activation of the Nrf2 mediates intermittent hypoxia (IH) cardiomyopathy protection.

Transgenic mice with a deletion of any Nrf2 gene (Nrf2-KO) are highly susceptible to the cardiovascular effects of intermittent hypoxia (IH) via cardiac oxidative damage, inflammation, fibrosis, and dysfunction.

Moreover, the specific overexpression in cardiomyocytes of Nrf2 (Nrf2-TG) in transgenic mice[KC1] is impervious to cardiac oxidative damage, inflammation, fibrosis, and dysfunction caused by intermittent hypoxia (IH)[KC2] . In response to IH, Nrf2 and its downstream antioxidants are strongly MT-dependent Nrf2 and may [KC3] act as a compensatory response to IH exposure by up-regulating MT (downstream antioxidant target genes) to protect the heart.

Prolonged exposure to IH reduces the binding of Nrf2 factor to the MT promoter gene, thereby inhibiting MT translation and expression. Moreover, a complex PI3K/Akt/GSK3B/Fyn signaling network provides cardio protection against IH when Nrf2 or MT is overexpressed in the heart. By activating the PI3K/Akt/GSK3B/Fyn signaling pathway, MT increaseNrf2 expression and transcriptional function in response to IH exposure. Although not yet proven, these effects suggest that it is possible to activate PI3K/Akt/GSK3B/Fyn dependent signaling pathways through cardiac MT overexpression to prevent chronic IH-induced cardiomyopathy and downregulation of Nrf2.

Therefore, Nrf2 or MT may be a potential treatment to avoid chronic IH-induced cardiomyopathy.

== History of research ==
In 1941, Soviet geochemist Dmitrii Petrovich Malyuga reported the occurrence of cadmium in human kidney, and by 1945 he was able to identify the chemical in different organisms including aspen tree, algae and aquatic invertebrates. English translation of Malyuga's work became available in the mid-1950s, which prompted western scientists to investigate on cadmium properties of living organisms. Since then, small amounts of cadmium had been detected in tissues and body fluids of different animals. Cadmium as a stable metal was not expected to be present in animal tissues as free element and two main hypotheses were proposed: one suggesting cadmium as a bound molecule to other biomolecules like proteins, and another indicating that it was a contaminant ingested from the environment.

In 1957, Marvin Margoshes and Bert L. Vallee at Harvard Medical School discovered that in horse kidney cortex, cadmium and zinc levels appeared to be maintained by binding to another molecule which they identified as a protein. They reported in the Journal of the American Chemical Society, concluding:

The low sedimentation constant and high metal content of this material are indicative of a low molecular weight protein, probably containing a small number of cadmium atoms per molecule. Characterization of this unusual natural product is in progress.

In 1958, Vallee presented the discovery at the International Congress of Biochemistry held in Vienna, and suggested that cadmium must be a natural biomolecule using the unknown protein. He pursued the research with his student Jeremias H. R. Kägi and was able to identify the new protein in 1960. The conclusion in The Journal of Biological Chemistry runs:

The present study reports the isolation and characterization of a protein from equine renal cortex which contains 2.9% of cadmium, 0.6% of zinc, and 4.1% of sulfur per g dry weight of protein. This protein has been termed metallothionein in view of its metal and sulfur content.

Vallee and Kägi reported further confirmation in the same journal in 1961. They later realised that metallothionein was not a single type of protein. With their collaborators, they could differentiate another related protein but with different amino acid properties and gave the name "metallothionein-1B" in 1970. Further purification of the protein from rat livers and kidneys in 1980 by Polish biochemists led by Andrzej J. Żelazowski and Jadwiga A. Szymańska indicated that the protein exists in distinct types (isoforms), each specific for cadmium, copper and mercury. These proteins were later named isoforms of type 1 and 2 (MT1 and MT2). In 1991, a team of Japanese neuroscientists found a different metallothionein in human brain that acted as growth inhibitor and linked to Alzheimer's disease. The protein became MT3. In 1994, a team led by Richard D. Palmiter of the University of Washington discovered the fourth type, MT4, from the epithelial cells of mouse and humans. The formal classification was introduced by Pierre-Alain Binz and Kägi in 1999.

Due to their obscure nature and diversity, the exact biological functions of metallothioneins were difficult to study and became established only by the mid-1990s. As Vallee later remarked, it took "40 years of frustrating efforts" to understand that the proteins are responsible for several fundamental cellular activities including zinc-dependent gene activation, growth inhibition of neurones, apoptosis and regulation of oxidative stress.

== See also ==
- Phytochelatin
