= Cysteine-rich protein =

Small protein with high number of disulphide bonds

Cysteine-rich proteins (CRP, cysteine-rich peptide or disulphide-rich peptide) are small proteins that contain a large number of cysteines. These cysteines either cross-link to form disulphide bonds, or bind metal ions by chelation, stabilising the protein's tertiary structure. CRPs include a highly conserved secretion peptide signal at the N-terminus and a cysteine-rich region at the C-terminus.

== Structure ==
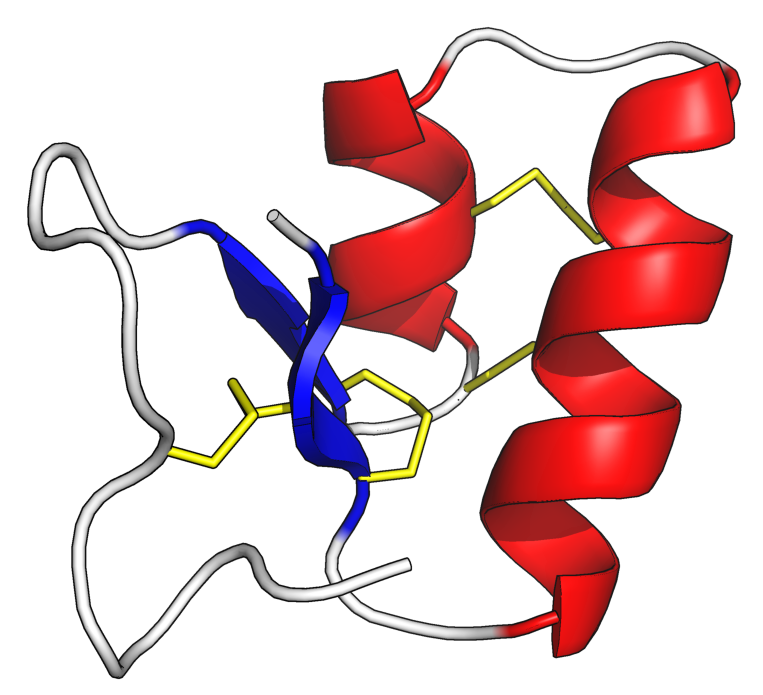
Example disulphide-linked CRP: a thionein. Cysteines in yellow. (PDB: 1BHP)

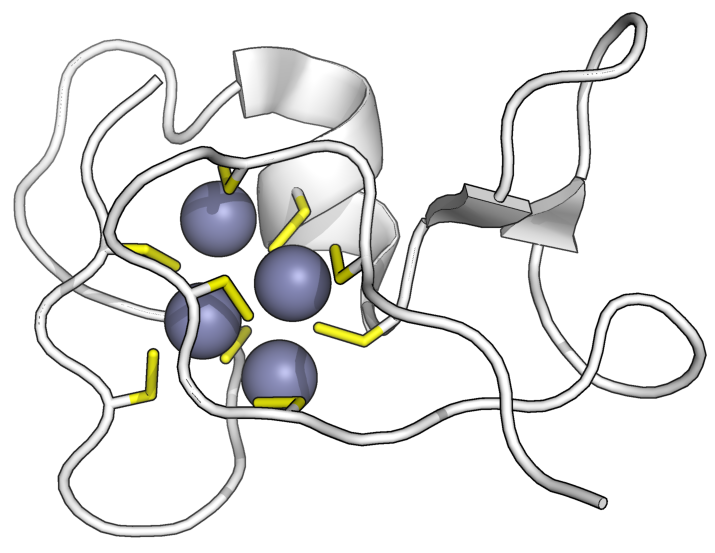
Example metal binding CRP: a metallothionein bound to zinc ions. Cysteines in yellow, zinc in purple. (PDB: 1JJD)

=== Disulphides ===
In an oxidising environment cysteines cross-link to form disulphide bonds. CRPs that form these typically have an even number of cysteines.

=== Metal binding ===
Cysteines can coordinate one or more metal ions by forming a chelation complex around them.

== Functions in plants ==
CRPs are numerous in plants, with 756 CRP-encoding genes in the Arabidopsis thaliana genome. Several CRPs bind known receptors, but most CRP signaling mechanisms and protein interactions are uncharacterized. Characterized CRPs function as short-range intercellular signals during processes such as plant defense, bacterial symbiosis, stomatal patterning, fertilization, vegetative tissue development, and seed development.

Many CRPs function in plant defense. Defensins, a major class of CRP with an eight-cysteine motif forming four disulfide bridges, are involved in pathogen response. Other putative antimicrobial CRPs include lipid transfer proteins, thionins, knottins, heveins, and snakins. Additionally, some CRPs have allergenic, ɑ-amylase inhibitory, or protease inhibitory functions that deter herbivores.

In plant reproduction, CRPs are involved in pollen tube growth and guidance and early embryo patterning, in addition to other functions. Among those involved in pollen tube attraction are the LUREs, a group of ovular pollen-tube attractants in Arabidopsis thaliana and Torenia fournieri that preferentially attract conspecific pollen, and STIG1, a CRP expressed in the stigma of Solanum lycopersicum that interacts with the pollen-specific receptor PRK2. In early embryo development, CRPs such as ESF1 are necessary for suspensor development and normal seed morphology.
