= Bruce Fowler (disambiguation) =

Bruce Fowler is an American trombonist.

Bruce Fowler may also refer to:

- Bruce Fowler (American football), American football coach
- Bruce Fowler (tenor), American operatic tenor
- Bruce A. Fowler, American toxicologist
