= M. Daniel Lane =

American biochemist

- Born: 1930; Chicago, Illinois, US
- Died: April 10, 2014 (aged 83–84); Baltimore, Maryland, US
- Education: Iowa State University, University of Illinois
- Known for: Studies of lipogenesis and adipogenesis
- Scientific career
- Fields: Biochemistry
- Workplaces: Johns Hopkins School of Medicine

Malcolm Daniel Lane (1930 – April 10, 2014) was an American biochemist who spent most of his career on the faculty at the Johns Hopkins School of Medicine in Baltimore, Maryland. Lane served as the head of the Department of Biological Chemistry from 1978 to 1997, was elected to the National Academy of Sciences in 1987, and was named a University Distinguished Service Professor – the institution's highest academic title – in 2001. Lane's research focused on the biochemistry of lipids and lipid metabolism, and the resulting physiological mechanisms regulating adipogenesis and obesity.

== Early life and education ==
Lane was born in Chicago, Illinois on August 10, 1930, to Malcolm Daniel Lane Snr, an accountant at the Herald Tribune and Helga Wilke who was of Danish origin. He attended Iowa State University and received his B.S. in 1951 and his M.S. in 1953. He then moved to the University of Illinois Urbana-Champaign and received his Ph.D. in biochemistry in 1956.

== Academic career ==
Lane began his faculty career immediately after finishing his Ph.D. with an appointment as an associate professor at the Virginia Polytechnic Institute, where he advanced to full professor in 1963. After a brief sabbatical in Munich, Germany to work with Feodor Lynen, he moved from Virginia Tech to the New York University School of Medicine in 1964. Lane was recruited to the Johns Hopkins School of Medicine by Albert Lehninger, chair of what was then known at the Department of Physiological Chemistry, in 1970. Lane subsequently succeeded Lehninger as department chair in 1978, changing the department's name to Biological Chemistry, and served in that position until 1997.

At Johns Hopkins, Lane taught metabolism and metabolic biochemistry to medical students from his arrival in the department until 2006, and was well known for his teaching skills. He was also noted as an enthusiastic mentor of younger scientists, including support for the young laboratory of future Nobel Prize winner Peter Agre. He served on the editorial boards of several scientific journals, including a stint as executive editor of Biochemical and Biophysical Research Communications in 1986. He held various leadership roles in the American Society for Biochemistry and Molecular Biology, most notably serving as the society's president in 1990.

Lane retired from his faculty position, assuming professor emeritus status, in 2008.

== Research ==
In the early phases of his career, Lane was primarily interested in vitamins and vitamin metabolism, particularly in biotin-dependent enzymes such as propionyl-CoA carboxylase and acetyl-CoA carboxylase, which he studied in and purified from calf and chicken livers. This work was later recognized as classic in the field by the Journal of Biological Chemistry. His interest in vitamins and nutrition led him to focus later on lipogenesis and its regulation. Lane's laboratory published widely cited early studies of the insulin receptor and made extensive use of the 3T3-L1 cell line for investigating cellular differentiation processes leading to adipocytes. After the discovery of the satiety-regulating hormone leptin, Lane's laboratory focused its efforts on characterizing its regulation.

== Personal life ==
Lane met and married his wife Patricia during his time at Iowa State. The couple had two children Danny Lane and Claudia Lane. Lane was an enthusiastic fisherman who enjoyed fishing and boating on the Chesapeake Bay. He was involved in local social justice and environmental activism. Lane died of myeloma on April 10, 2014.

== Awards and honors ==
- Received the American Institute of Nutrition's Mead-Johnson Award, 1966
- Received the American Society for Biochemistry and Molecular Biology's William C. Rose Award, 1981
- Elected to the American Academy of Arts and Sciences, 1982
- Received the Johns Hopkins University School of Medicine Professor's Award for Distinction in Teaching, 1986
- Elected to the National Academy of Sciences, 1987
- Received a National Institutes of Health MERIT award, 1990
- Elected to the American Society for Nutritional Sciences, 1996
- Named Johns Hopkins University Distinguished Service Professor, 2001
