= William C. Rose Award =

The William C. Rose Award given by the American Society for Biochemistry and Molecular Biology recognizes outstanding contributions to biochemical and molecular biological research and a demonstrated commitment to the training of younger scientists, as epitomized by the late American nutritionist William Cumming Rose. The nominations are filed by the Society members, but the nominees need not be ASBMB members.

== Past recipients ==
Source: American Society for Biochemistry and Molecular Biology

- 1979 – Minor J. Coon
- 1980 – Bert L. Vallee
- 1981 – M. Daniel Lane
- 1982 – Hector F. DeLuca
- 1983 – Robert T. Schimke
- 1984 – Alton Meister
- 1985 – Esmond E. Snell
- 1986 – Irwin C. Gunsalus
- 1987 – Theresa Stadtman
- 1988 – Henry A. Lardy
- 1989 – Paul D. Boyer
- 1990 – Harland G. Wood
- 1991 – Robert L. Hill
- 1992 – Eugene P. Kennedy
- 1993 – Irving M. Klotz
- 1994 – Robert H. Abeles
- 1995 – Celia White Tabor, Herbert Tabor
- 1996 – Julius Adler
- 1997 – Charles Yanofsky
- 1998 – Robert D. Simoni
- 1999 – Richard W. Hanson
- 2000 – Rowena Green Matthews
- 2001 – Marc W. Kirschner
- 2002 – Gordon Hammes
- 2003 – Jack E. Dixon
- 2004 – Sunney I. Chan
- 2005 – Frederick Guengerich
- 2006 – William L. Smith
- 2007 – Susan S. Taylor
- 2008 – John D. Scott
- 2009 – Sandra Schmid
- 2010 – Daniel Herschlag
- 2011 – Melissa J. Moore
- 2012 – Susan Marqusee
- 2013 – Ivan Đikić
- 2014 – Lynne Maquat
- 2015 – Kathleen Matthews
- 2016 – Susan J. Baserga
- 2017 – William T. Wickner
- 2018 – Steven G. Clarke
- 2019 – Dorothy Shippen
- 2021 – Celia Schiffer
- 2022 – J. Martin Bollinger
- 2023 – Catherine Drennan

== See also ==
- List of biology awards
