= MT1X =

Protein-coding gene in the species Homo sapiens

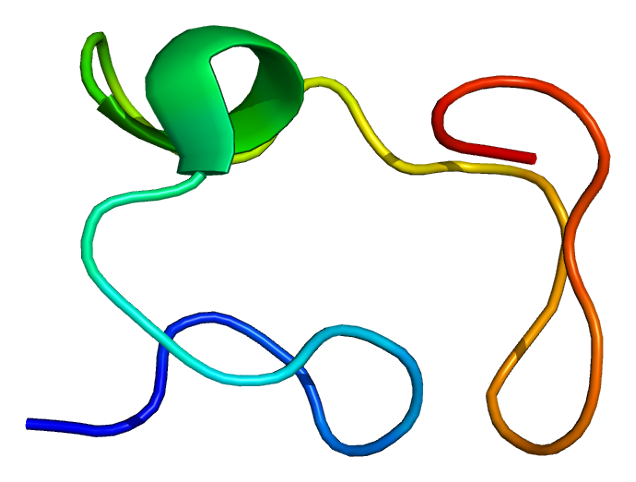

Identifiers
- Aliases: MT1X, MT-1l, MT1, metallothionein 1X
- External IDs: OMIM: 156359; HomoloGene: 130542; GeneCards: MT1X; OMA:MT1X - orthologs

Gene location (Human)
Chr.	Chromosome 16 (human)
Band	16q13	Start	56,682,470 bp
Band	16q13	End	56,684,196 bp
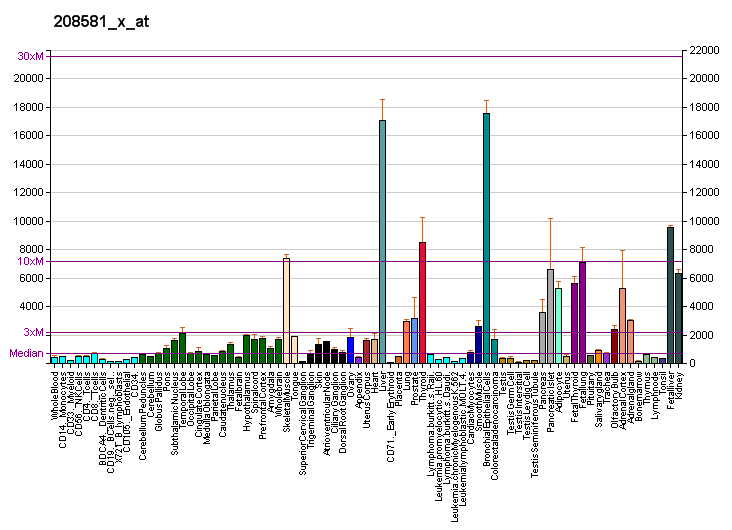

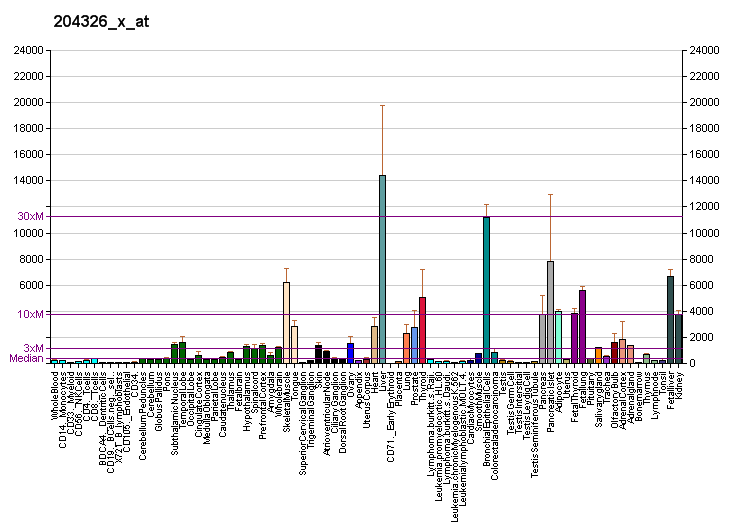
RNA expression pattern
Bgee	Human / Mouse (ortholog); Top expressed in: pericardium; right lobe of liver; gastrocnemius muscle; right lobe of thyroid gland; left lobe of thyroid gland; skin of abdomen; muscle of thigh; skin of leg; tibialis anterior muscle; external globus pallidus / n/a; More reference expression data
BioGPS	More reference expression data
Gene ontology
Molecular function	protein binding; metal ion binding; zinc ion binding; copper ion binding
Cellular component	cytoplasm; perinuclear region of cytoplasm; nucleus; lysosome; cytosol
Biological process	response to metal ion; cellular response to erythropoietin; negative regulation of growth; cellular response to cadmium ion; cellular response to zinc ion; cellular metal ion homeostasis; cellular zinc ion homeostasis; nitric oxide mediated signal transduction; detoxification of copper ion; negative regulation of neuron apoptotic process; cellular response to chromate; cellular response to copper ion
Sources:Amigo / QuickGO
Orthologs
Species	Human	Mouse
Entrez	4501	n/a
Ensembl	ENSG00000187193	n/a
UniProt	P80297	n/a
RefSeq (mRNA)	NM_005952	n/a
RefSeq (protein)	NP_005943	n/a
Location (UCSC)	Chr 16: 56.68 – 56.68 Mb	n/a
PubMed search		n/a
- Wikidata
View/Edit Human

Metallothionein 1X, also known as MT1X, is a protein which in humans is encoded by the gene.

== See also ==
- Metallothionein
