= Reinhard Dallinger =

Austrian zoologist

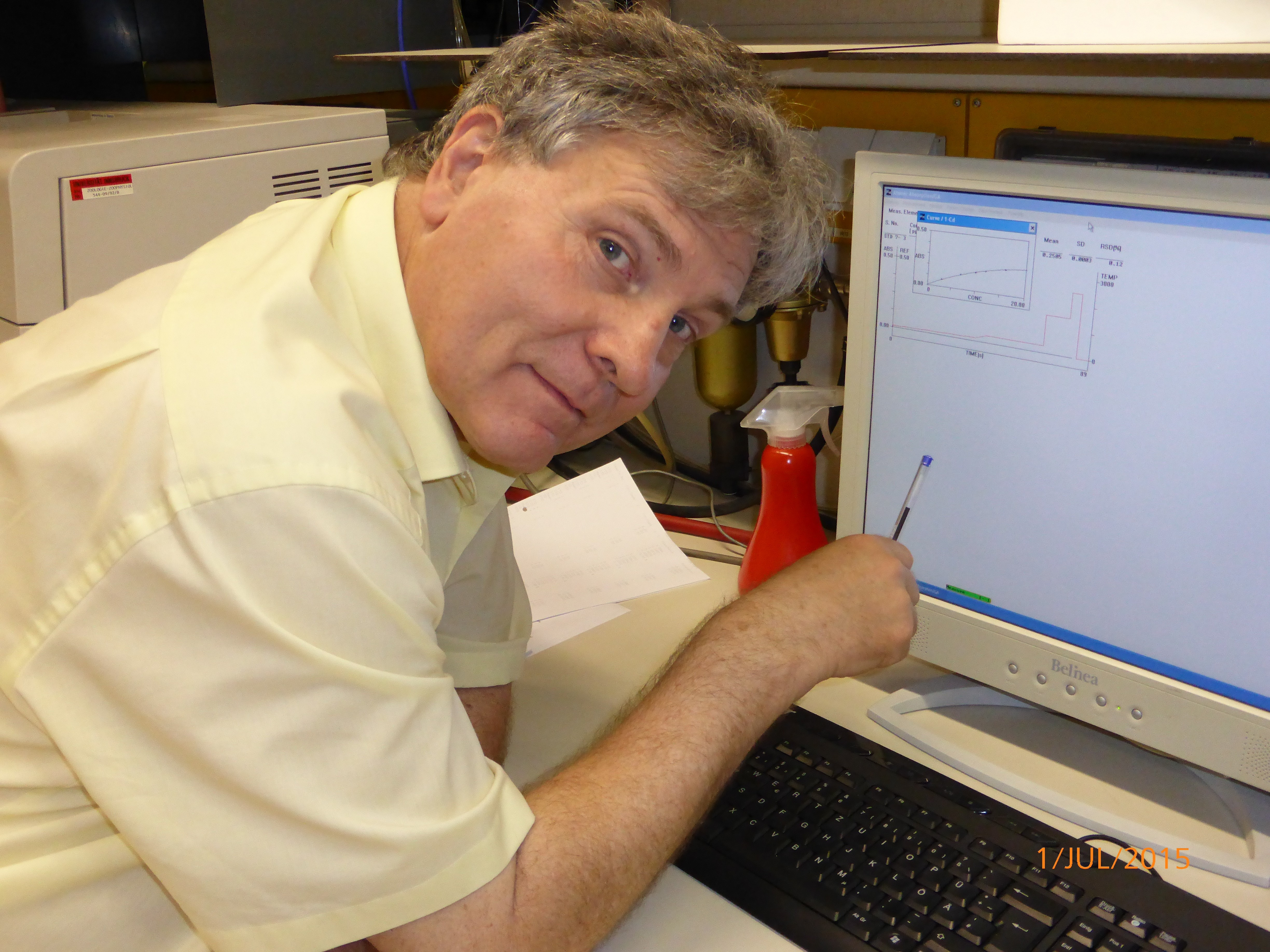
- Born: 2 April 1950 (age 76); Laives, South Tyrol, Italy
- Known for: Biochemistry and physiology of trace element metabolism of invertebrate animals and environmental toxicology of metals in terrestric and aquatic habitats.
- Scientific career
- Fields: Zoology
- Workplaces: University of Innsbruck

Reinhard Dallinger (born 2 April 1950) is an Italian-born Austrian zoologist and professor of zoology and ecotoxicology at the University of Innsbruck (retired since 1 October 2017). He works in the field of biochemistry and physiology of trace element metabolism of invertebrate animals and in the field of environmental toxicology of metals in terrestric and aquatic habitats.

== Life ==
Reinhard Dallinger studied zoology and microbiology at the University of Innsbruck, where he received his doctorate at the faculty of natural sciences in 1978. From 1978 to 1981 he was a freelance project manager in the waste management dealing with biological aspects of composting processes. From 1981 to 1989 he was working as a project assistant for zoology at the University of Innsbruck. He was habilitated in 1989 with a work on heavy metals in invertebrate animals. Next he used to work as an associate professor at the Institute of Zoology. Dallinger leads the workgroup of ecotoxicology and molecular physiology. In 2011 he was appointed university professor for eco toxicology at the University of Innsburck. He has retired since 1 October 2017.

== Scientific contribution ==
A major focus of Dallinger's work is dedicated to the biochemical and cell-physiological mechanisms which govern the accumulation of metallic trace elements in invertebrates and fish. By considering both, physiological and ecological aspects, his work has contributed to our knowledge and understanding of the importance of invertebrates for the trace element transfer in terrestrial and aquatic habitats and for the application of some key representative species as biological indicators in metal-contaminated environments.

A further topic of Dallinger’s ecotoxicological research has focused on aspects of microevolution and adaptation of species and populations to contaminants (metals, pesticides) in combination with different anthropogenic stressors. It could be shown, for example, that the widespread apple pest species, Cydia pomonella, has split into varied adaptable populations over small-scale areas in the alpine region under the selective pressure of pesticide application. Many of these populations have been able to acquire pesticide resistance. Another example of microevolutionary adaptation to environmental pollution has been demonstrated by Dallinger and coworkers in populations of the freshwater sludge worm, Tubifex tubifex. Due to historic and recent metal pollution in European river systems, native populations of this species have split into lineages and cryptic species that differ with respect to their metal resistance.

A rather molecular and biochemical focus of Dallinger’s work is devoted to the mechanisms of detoxification and regulation of metallic trace elements by metal binding proteins belonging to the superfamily of metallothioneins. Dallinger has shown that in certain invertebrate animals (such as, for example, in terrestrial pulmonate snails), metal-selective metallothionein isoforms have evolved that are specifically dedicated to the metabolism of distinct metallic trace elements. The Roman snail (Helix pomatia), for example, possesses a copper-selective isoform involved in homeostatic regulation of copper, whereas a cadmium-specific isoform is responsible for the detoxification of this metal by binding it selectively The genes of these isoforms can be upregulated differentially by metal exposure and non-metallic stressors, thus constituting an impressive example for the adaptive diversification of a gene family towards accomplishing trace element-specific physiological tasks. Dallinger was also involved in the elucidation of the three-dimensional structure of a metallothionein with three Cadmium-binding domains from the intertidal periwinkle, Littorina littorea.

Dallinger’s publications are characterized by a comparative and interdisciplinary approach with an integrative perspective, by addressing issues across different layers of biological organization.

== Honors and awards ==
- 1987 Eduard-Wallnöfer-Award of the Tyrolian Industry
- 1992 Scientific Award of the City of Innsbruck

== Participation in expeditions ==
1988 Expedition to Lake Tanganyika in cooperation with Christian Sturmbauer (Institute for Zoology, University of Graz). Work on Ethology and nutritional physiology of Tanganyika-Cichlids.

== Guest residence in foreign universities ==
- 1984-1985 Guest- and cooperation residence at the Institute for Zoology of the University of Heidelberg and at the Institute for Biochemistry of the veterinary faculty of the University of Bologna
- 1991-1995 repeated Guest- and cooperation residence at the Institute for Biochemistry of the University of Zurich

== Visiting professorships ==
2004-05 and 2005-06 Visiting professor for animal physiology at the Institute for Zoology, University of Vienna
