= Sunney Chan =

Taiwanese-American biophysical chemist (1936–2025)

Sunney Ignatius Chan
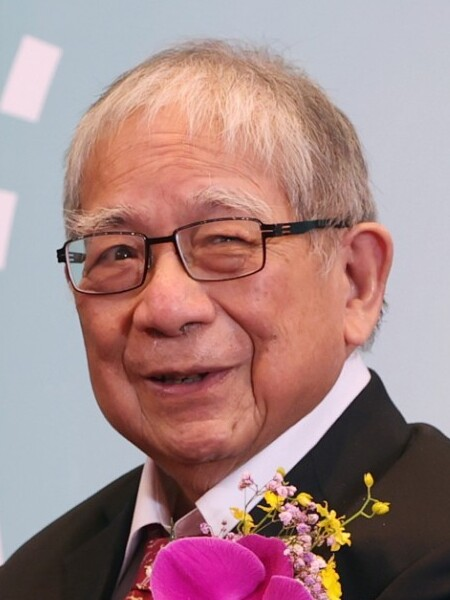
- Chan in 2021
- Born: October 5, 1936; San Francisco, California, U.S.
- Died: May 5, 2025 (aged 88); Taipei, Taiwan
- Resting place: Holy Cross Catholic Cemetery, Colma, California, US
- Education: University of California, Berkeley (BS, PhD)
- Known for: Use of NMR on biological systems; Interactions of Cytochrome c oxidase
- Awards: Guggenheim Fellow (1968); William C. Rose Award (2004)
- Scientific career
- Fields: Biophysical chemistry
- Workplaces: University of California, Riverside; California Institute of Technology; Academia Sinica; National Taiwan University; National Chung Hsing University
- Thesis: The nature of the ring puckering vibration and its effects on the far-infrared and microwave spectra of trimethylene oxide (1961)
- Doctoral advisor: William Dulaney Gwinn
- Other academic advisors: Norman Foster Ramsey Jr. (post doc advisor)
- Doctoral students: Utpal Banerjee; Michael Sheetz

Sunney Ignatius Chan (Chinese: 陳長謙; pinyin: Chén Zhǎngqiān; October 5, 1936 – May 5, 2025) was a Taiwanese-American biophysical chemist. His work primarily focused on the use of various magnetic resonance spectroscopic and other physical chemical techniques in the analysis of various biochemical and biological problems.

== Early life and education ==
Chan was born in San Francisco, California, on October 5, 1936, to Chinese immigrant parents originally from Southern China. He received his secondary education in Hong Kong, then returned to the U.S. to attend the University of San Francisco. Shortly afterwards, he transferred to the University of California, Berkeley, where he earned a Bachelor of Science in chemistry in 1957 and his Ph.D. in chemistry in 1960. He completed his doctoral work under the supervision of physical chemist William Dulaney Gwinn. His dissertation was titled, "The nature of the ring puckering vibration and its effects on the far-infrared and microwave spectra of trimethylene oxide".

== Career ==
After receiving his doctorate, Chan completed a one-year post-doctoral fellowship in the laboratory of the Nobel laureate physicist Norman Ramsey at Harvard University and later returned to California to join the chemistry faculty at University of California, Riverside. He began teaching at the California Institute of Technology in 1963. Five years later, he was awarded a Guggenheim fellowship. Chan received several honors throughout his career at Caltech, among them fellowship into the American Physical Society (1987) and American Association for the Advancement of Science (1992), as well as membership of Academia Sinica (1988). He was appointed Caltech's first George Grant Hoag Professor of Biophysical Chemistry in 1992. Chan retired from Caltech in 1997, for a position as distinguished research fellow at Academia Sinica. Subsequently, Chan was named vice president of Academia Sinica under Yuan T. Lee. Caltech granted emeritus status to Chan in 2002. Upon Chan's retirement as vice president of Academia Sinica in July 2003, Lee inaugurated the Sunney Chan Lecture in Chan's honor. He remained affiliated with Academia Sinica as a research and visiting fellow until 2015. In his later career, Chan held distinguished chair and research professorships at National Taiwan University and National Chung Hsing University.

== Death ==
Chan died May 5, 2025, at the age of 88. He was buried two weeks later at the Holy Cross Catholic Cemetery in Colma, California.

== Legacy ==
Academia Sinica has an annual lecture series named in Chan's honor since 2003.
