= Metallothionein-3 =

Protein found in humans

MT3
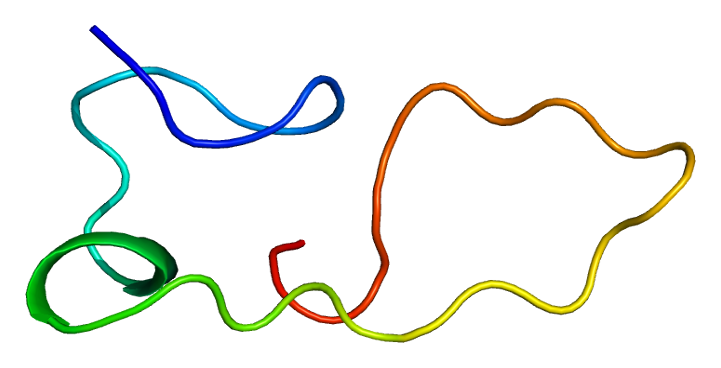

Identifiers
- Aliases: MT3, GIF, GIFB, GRIF, Znmetallothionein 3
- External IDs: OMIM: 139255; MGI: 97173; GeneCards: MT3
Available structures
PDB	Ortholog search: PDBe RCSB
PDB	List of PDB id codes 2F5H, 2FJ4, 2FJ5

Gene location (Human)
Chr.	Chromosome 16 (human)
Band	16q13	Start	56,589,074 bp
Band	16q13	End	56,591,088 bp

Gene location (Mouse)
Chr.	Chromosome 8 (mouse)
Band	8 C5|8 46.29 cM	Start	94,879,235 bp
Band	8 C5|8 46.29 cM	End	94,880,774 bp
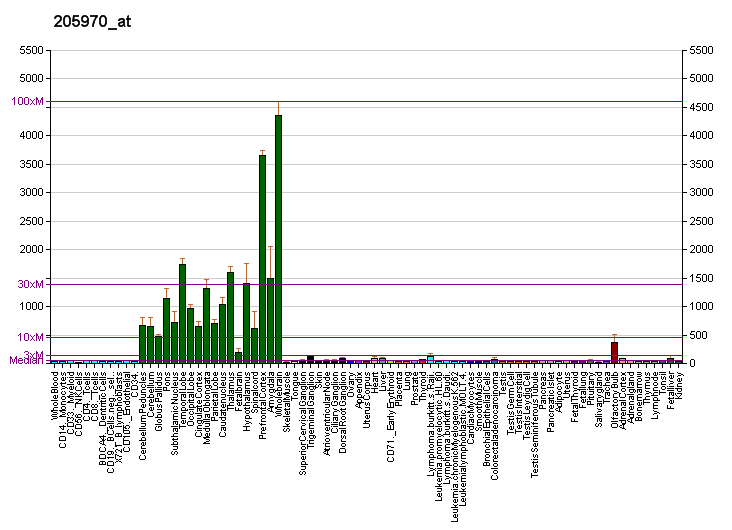
RNA expression pattern
Bgee	Human / Mouse (ortholog); Top expressed in: nucleus accumbens; putamen; Brodmann area 9; temporal lobe; amygdala; substantia nigra; caudate nucleus; right frontal lobe; prefrontal cortex; hippocampus proper / Top expressed in: choroid plexus of fourth ventricle; dentate gyrus of hippocampal formation granule cell; perirhinal cortex; entorhinal cortex; CA3 field; primary visual cortex; superior frontal gyrus; dorsomedial hypothalamic nucleus; superior colliculus; central gray substance of midbrain; More reference expression data
BioGPS	More reference expression data
Gene ontology
Molecular function	zinc ion binding; protein kinase activator activity; metal ion binding; cysteine-type endopeptidase inhibitor activity involved in apoptotic process; antioxidant activity; protein binding; copper ion binding; cadmium ion binding
Cellular component	cytoplasm; cytosol; rough endoplasmic reticulum; ribosome; astrocyte end-foot; postsynaptic density; synaptic vesicle; plasma membrane; dendritic spine; astrocyte projection; intracellular anatomical structure; mitochondrial outer membrane; axon; inclusion body; perinuclear region of cytoplasm; microtubule; extracellular space; nucleus
Biological process	negative regulation of neuron apoptotic process; positive regulation of necrotic cell death; cellular lipid catabolic process; positive regulation of vascular endothelial growth factor receptor signaling pathway; activation of protein kinase B activity; negative regulation of cysteine-type endopeptidase activity involved in apoptotic process; positive regulation of protein phosphorylation; positive regulation of cell death; response to hypoxia; zinc ion homeostasis; protein kinase B signaling; histone modification; leptin-mediated signaling pathway; removal of superoxide radicals; astrocyte development; ERK1 and ERK2 cascade; negative regulation of neurogenesis; regulation of response to food; protein stabilization; zinc ion transport; response to metal ion; negative regulation of apoptotic process; positive regulation of catalytic activity; cholesterol catabolic process; cellular response to cadmium ion; cellular metal ion homeostasis; cadmium ion homeostasis; response to oxidative stress; negative regulation of hydrogen peroxide catabolic process; negative regulation of cysteine-type endopeptidase activity; positive regulation of transcription, DNA-templated; brain development; positive regulation of gene expression; positive regulation of lysosomal membrane permeability; cellular zinc ion homeostasis; negative regulation of cell growth; positive regulation of transcription from RNA polymerase II promoter in response to oxidative stress; negative regulation of oxidoreductase activity; regulation of protein glycosylation; positive regulation of ERK1 and ERK2 cascade; positive regulation of oxygen metabolic process; cellular response to oxidative stress; cellular response to nitric oxide; negative regulation of reactive oxygen species metabolic process; energy reserve metabolic process; cell population proliferation; negative regulation of autophagy; negative regulation of transcription, DNA-templated; negative regulation of axon extension; negative regulation of necrotic cell death; cellular response to hypoxia; negative regulation of neuron death; apoptotic process; detoxification of copper ion; cellular response to copper ion; cellular response to zinc ion; negative regulation of neuron projection development
Sources:Amigo / QuickGO
Orthologs
Databases	NCBI: entry; OMA: entry
Species	Human	Mouse
Entrez	4504	17751
Ensembl	ENSG00000087250	ENSMUSG00000031760
UniProt	P25713	P28184
RefSeq (mRNA)	NM_005954	NM_013603
RefSeq (protein)	NP_005945	NP_038631
Location (UCSC)	Chr 16: 56.59 – 56.59 Mb	Chr 8: 94.88 – 94.88 Mb
PubMed search
- Wikidata
View/Edit Human	View/Edit Mouse

Metallothionein-3 (also known as Growth Inhibitory Factor) is a protein that in humans is encoded by the MT3 gene. It is a 68-amino acid peptide (20 of which are cysteine) that is abnormally under-expressed in the brains of patients with Alzheimer's disease. Metallothionein-3 is a member of the metallothionein family of proteins.
