= Ivan Đikić =

Croatian cancer researcher (born 1966)

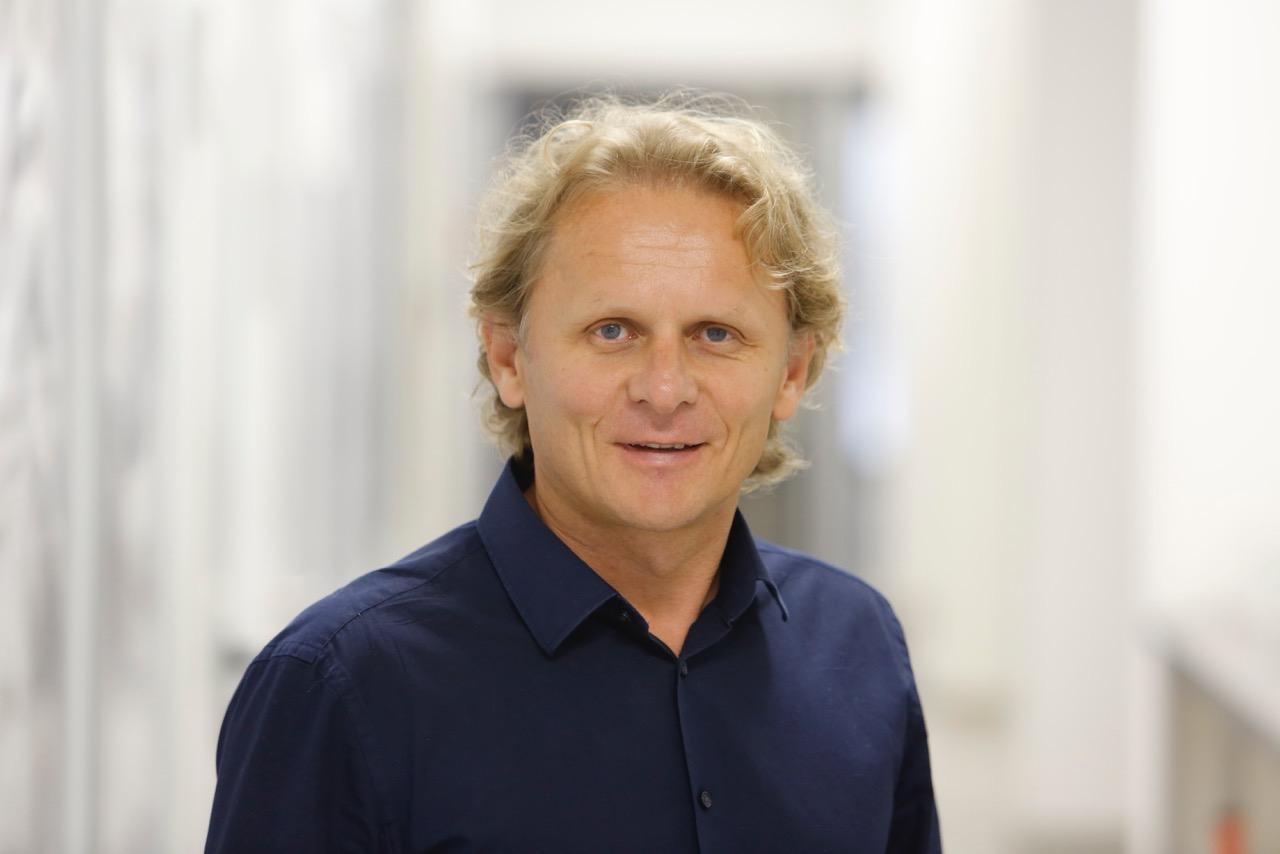
- Born: 28 May 1966 (age 60); Zagreb, Croatia
- Education: University of Zagreb New York University
- Known for: Oncogenic signaling, ubiquitin signaling
- Awards: Gottfried Wilhelm Leibniz Prize (2013); William C. Rose Award (2013); Ernst Jung Prize (2013); German Cancer Prize (2010); AACR Award (2006); Louis-Jeantet Prize (2023)
- Scientific career
- Fields: Cancer research, Cell biology, Signal transduction, Autophagy, Ubiquitin
- Workplaces: Goethe University Frankfurt, University of Split
- Thesis: The Role of RAS Messenger in Supervision of Division and Cell Differentiation (1997)
- Doctoral advisor: Krešimir Pavelić

Ivan Đikić (born 28 May 1966) is a Croatian-German molecular biologist who is the Director of the Institute of Biochemistry II at Goethe University Frankfurt.

== Scientific career ==
In 1991, he earned his MD degree from the Faculty of Medicine at the University of Zagreb. After finishing his medical studies, he continued to pursue his PhD thesis in molecular biology at the University of Zagreb and at the New York University School of Medicine until 1997. He continued to work as a postdoctoral fellow in the laboratory of Joseph Schlessinger in New York from 1995 to 1997 before starting his own group at the Ludwig Institute for Cancer Research in Uppsala (Sweden).

In 2002, Đikić was appointed as a Professor at Goethe University Frankfurt. He followed in Werner Müller-Esterl's footsteps as Director of the Institute of Biochemistry II in 2009. In addition, Đikić was the first Scientific Director (2009–2013) of the Buchmann Institute for Molecular Life Sciences, a cross-faculty, interdisciplinary institute at Goethe University which was founded as part of the Cluster of Excellence Macromolecular Complexes. He is speaker of the Collaborative Research Center 1177 on selective autophagy, and speaker of the LOEWE program "Ubiquitin Networks".

Đikić has an affiliation as Professor with the School of Medicine University of Split, where he established an outstation lab in Split University and transferring technologies to Croatia. In addition, Đikić has been recognized by one of the highest civilian honours, The Order of Duke Branimir, bestowed by the President of Croatia.

Đikić is member of several academic societies, including the number of organizations including the European Molecular Biology Organization (since 2004), the World Academy of Art and Science (since 2008), German National Academy of Sciences Leopoldina (since 2010), the American Academy of Arts and Sciences (since 2019), the Croatian Academy of Medical Science, and the European Academy of Sciences.

He is a member of the editorial board for Cell.

== Research ==
Đikić's research focuses on deciphering molecular mechanisms of cellular signaling pathways, which have a high relevance to human diseases such as cancer, neurodegenerative disorders and inflammation. Early on, he started to focus on ubiquitin to understand how this modification controls multiple cellular functions, and managed to prove a concept of ubiquitin signal recognition by specialized domains serving as specific receptors. More recently, his team has revealed the functions of linear ubiquitin chains in pathogen defense and overall immune response. He expanded his research to the field of selective autophagy, recognizing the enormous impact of the LC3/GABARAP signaling network displaying striking mechanistic similarities to ubiquitin. One major focus is on the crosstalk between autophagy and endocytic machineries, and in this context he has gained fundamental insight in autophagic processes at the endoplasmic reticulum (ER-phagy).

== Education ==
In 1998, Đikić initiated the series of Dubrovnik Cell Signalling Conferences, which has been sponsored by EMBO continuously since 2004. Moreover, he is actively involved in organization of EMBO Meetings (Ubiquitin Meetings in 2015, 2013; Autophagy Meeting 2011, Cellular Microbiology/Cell Biology Meeting in 2010, 2008), EMBO Courses (2012, 2010, 2008, 2006 on Ubiquitin/SUMO; 2010 on Ubiquitin & DNA damage) as well as Keystone and CSH Meetings. In July 2016, he was hosting the Frankfurt Conference on Ubiquitin and Autophagy together with Volker Dötsch, Hubert Serve and Heide Genau.

== Personal life ==
He's married to Inga Đikić with whom he has three children. He's a Christian of Roman Catholic denomination and has stated publicly that he sees no conflict between science and religion.

== Honors and awards ==
- 1997–2003 Research Award, Boehringer Ingelheim Fonds Germany
- 2000–2004 Award of the Strategic Funds for Young Leaders, Sweden
- 2002 Lilla Fernström Award, Lund, Sweden
- 2006 AACR Award for Outstanding Achievement in Cancer Research, Washington, US
- 2006 Young Cancer Researcher Award, European Association for Cancer Research, Budapest, Hungary
- 2006 Binder Innovation Prize, German Society for Cell Biology, Braunschweig, Germany
- 2006 Biomedical Science Prize 2006, Glaxo-Smith-Kline-Foundation, Munich, Germany
- 2008 Award of the International Society of Blood Purification, Brijuni Islands
- 2008 City of Split Award – Annual Prize for Science, Croatia
- 2009 Sir Hans Krebs Prize, Medical Faculty Hannover, Hannover, Germany
- 2010 German Cancer Prize, DKG Berlin, Germany
- 2010–2015 European Research Council (ERC) Advanced Grant, Brüssel, Belgium
- 2010 Order of Duke Branimir for international promotion of Croatia
- 2013 Ernst Jung Prize for Medicine 2013, Jung Foundation for Science and Research, Hamburg, Germany
- 2013 Gottfried Wilhelm Leibniz Prize of the German Research Foundation, Bonn, Germany
- 2013 William C. Rose Award 2013, American Association for Molecular Biology and Biochemistry for outstanding achievements, Boston, US
- 2014/2015 Vallee Visiting Professorship, Harvard Medical School, Boston, US
- 2015 Member of the Academia Europaea
- 2019 American Academy of Arts & Sciences
- 2023 Louis-Jeantet Prize for Medicine
