= Herbert Tabor =

American biochemist (1918–2020)

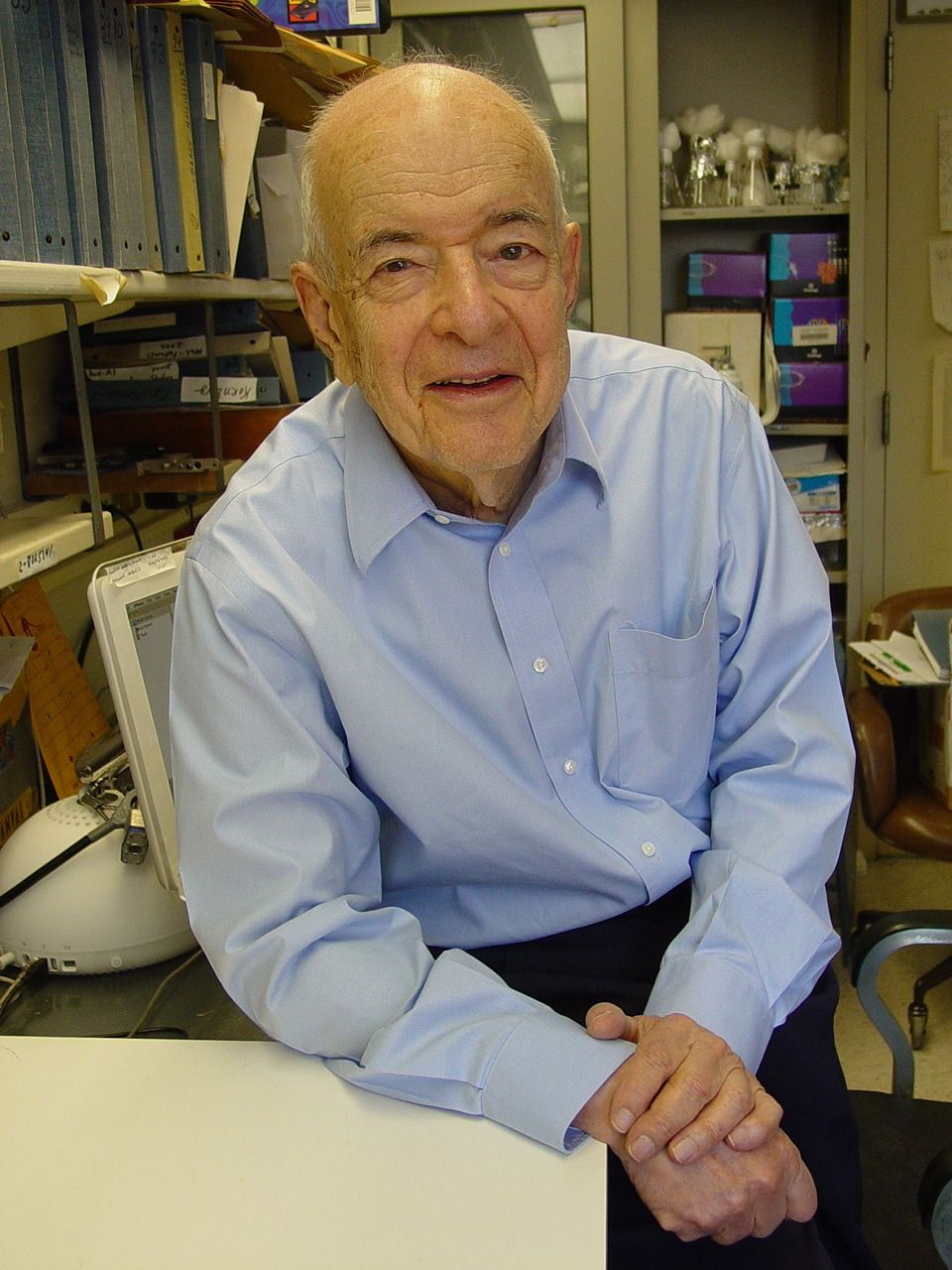
- Tabor in 2005
- Born: November 28, 1918; New York City, New York, U.S.
- Died: August 20, 2020 (aged 101); Bethesda, Maryland, U.S.
- Education: Harvard University
- Known for: Editor-in-chief of the Journal of Biological Chemistry from 1971 to 2010.
- Spouse: Celia White (m. 1946; died 2012)
- Children: 4
- Awards: William C. Rose Award (1995)
- Scientific career
- Fields: Biochemistry
- Workplaces: National Institute of Diabetes and Digestive and Kidney Diseases

Herbert Tabor (November 28, 1918 – August 20, 2020) was an American biochemist and physician-scientist who specialized in the function of polyamines and their role in human health and disease. Tabor was a principal investigator at the National Institute of Diabetes and Digestive and Kidney Diseases where he was Chief of the Laboratory of Biochemical Pharmacology. He was the editor-in-chief of the Journal of Biological Chemistry from 1971 to 2010.

== Education ==
Tabor was born in New York City in 1918. Tabor received a Bachelor of Arts at Harvard College in 1937 and a Doctor of Medicine at Harvard Medical School (HMS) in 1941. He was a researcher in the department of biological chemistry at HMS in 1941. Tabor worked in the lab of John Peters researching a carbon monoxide method to measure blood volumes while he completed a medical internship at Yale New Haven Hospital from 1942 to 1943.

== Career ==
Tabor was a principal investigator at the National Institute of Diabetes and Digestive and Kidney Diseases (NIDDK) until 2020 and was the Chief of the Laboratory of Biochemical Pharmacology from 1962 to 1996. At the time of his death he held the record as the longest-serving employee in the history of the National Institutes of Health (77 years).

Tabor was the editor-in-chief of the Journal of Biological Chemistry from 1971 to 2010. Under his direction the journal expanded from 1,000 to 4,500 published articles per annum. He led the transition to online publishing in 1995.

=== Research ===
Tabor researched the function of polyamines and their role in human health and disease. His research program investigated the biochemistry, regulation, and genetics of these amines and of the biosynthetic enzymes in S. cerevisiae and E. coli. Their work has demonstrated that the polyamines are required for growth of the organisms, their sporulation, protection against oxidative damage, protection against elevated temperatures, fidelity of protein biosynthesis, and for the maintenance of mitochondria. Tabor's lab has constructed clones that overproduce the various enzymes and have studied the sequence and structural characteristics of these enzymes. The research has concentrated on the structure and regulation of ornithine decarboxylase, spermidine synthase, spermine synthase, and S-adenosylmethionine decarboxylase.

== Awards and honors ==
Tabor was elected to the National Academy of Sciences in 1977. In 1986, Tabor and his wife, Celia White Tabor, won the Hillebrand Prize from the Chemical Society of Washington. In 1995, they received a William C. Rose Award.

== Personal life ==
Tabor married physician-scientist Celia White in 1946. The couple had met through common friends six years earlier on a Boston streetcar. They moved to the NIH campus in 1949 where they raised their daughter and three sons. Celia White Tabor died in 2012. Tabor died at his home on the NIH campus on August 20, 2020.
