= Bert L. Vallee =

Bert Lester Vallee
- Born: 1 June 1919
- Died: 7 May 2010 (aged 90)
- Education: New York University
- Known for: Discoveries of metallothioneins, angiogenin and fibroblast growth factor
- Spouse: Natalie K. Vallee
- Awards: Kaj Linderstrøm-Lang Prize; Willard Gibbs Medal; William C. Rose Award
- Scientific career
- Fields: Biomedicine, biochemistry
- Workplaces: Massachusetts Institute of Technology; Harvard Medical School

Bert Lester Vallee (1 June 1919 – 7 May 2010) was an American medical scientist and biochemist noted for his research in angiogenesis (blood vessel formation) and biological properties of trace metals. Nicknamed "Mr. Zinc", his research on biological metals led to the discoveries of the roles of zinc and the concomitant zinc-binding proteins, metallothioneins. His research on angiogenesis resulted in the discoveries of angiogenesis factors that have important roles in cancer development, such as angiogenin and fibroblast growth factor.

Born in Germany, Vallee graduated in zoology from the University of Bern. With fellowship from the international programme International Student Service of the League of Nations, he entered New York University, which awarded him an M.D. degree at the height of World War II. He was able to work with eminent Jewish refugee scientists simultaneously at Harvard Medical School and Massachusetts Institute of Technology. He retired from Harvard as Edgar M. Bronfman Distinguished Senior Professor.

Vallee was the founder and president of the Endowment and the CBBSM (Center for Biochemical & Biophysical Sciences & Medicine). He received the Kaj Linderstrøm-Lang Prize for protein research from Carlsberg Laboratory, the Willard Gibbs Medal from the American Chemical Society and the William C. Rose Award from the American Society for Biochemistry and Molecular Biology. In 1996, with his wife, he founded The Vallee Foundation for promoting education and research in biomedicine.

== Early life and career ==
Vallee was born in Hemer, Westphalia, Germany, to Josef and Rosa Blumenthal. The family moved to Luxembourg, where he completed his school education. He then moved to Switzerland to study science at the University of Bern. He earned his B.Sc. in zoology 1938. His course in developmental biology under Hans Spemann (laureate of the 1935 Nobel Prize in Physiology or Medicine for the discovery of embryonic induction) would be a major influence in his later research. As soon as he graduated, he was selected for fellowship under the International Student Service of the League of Nations by which he chose to study in US. He became the first and only fellow of this organisation.

Under the tutorage and advice from Richard Courant, a Jewish mathematician at the University of Göttingen who had fled Nazi Germany and joined the New York University in 1936, Vallee qualified the entrance to medical course at the medical school of New York University. He received his M.D degree in 1943 and interned at Glady Hospital in Atlanta and then at Mount Sinai Hospital in New York City. Many scientists he worked with were Jewish refugees from Germany and Austria who influenced him on protein chemistry. After his intern, he briefly worked at Massachusetts Institute of Technology while also joining Harvard Medical School in Medicine and Biochemistry. At Harvard, he worked with two eminent protein scientists, Edwin Joseph Cohn and John Edsall, who initiated his research on blood proteins, particularly on the mystery at the time that zinc might be associated with white blood cells. Vallee was a member of the Medical and Science Faculty of Harvard University since 1948. He was the Founding Director of the Biophysics Research Laboratory at Harvard (predecessor to the CBBSM), which was established in 1954 by The Rockefeller Foundation. From 1964 to 1989, Vallee held the Paul C. Cabot Professorship of Biochemistry, and since 1980 he held the Edgar M. Bronfman Distinguished Senior Professorship at Harvard.

=== Research ===
His primary research was in zinc enzymology, a field he is credited with establishing and for which he received the Raulin Award. His work on alcohol dehydrogenase, a zinc enzyme, led to his interest in the study of the molecular basis of alcohol use and abuse. Dr. Vallee was an expert on emission spectroscopy and the author of more than 600 scientific publications including books.

He was an Honorary Professor of Tsinghua University, Beijing, China, the Shanghai Institute of Biochemistry, the Chinese Academy of Sciences, Shanghai, China, and the Stellenbosch University, Stellenbosch, South Africa. He was a member of the National Academy of Sciences of the US and of the Royal Danish Academy of Science and Letters. Vallee held Honorary Degrees from the Karolinska Institute, Stockholm, the University of Naples Federico II, Naples, and LMU Munich.

== Awards and recognitions ==
He was awarded the Order of Andres Bello, First Class of the Republic of Venezuela, and the Gibbs, Linderstrom-Lang, and Rose Medals.

== Personal life ==
Vallee met Natalie T. Kugris, a biology student at Boston University while he worked at MIT. They married in 1947. Natalie became professor of biology at Harvard in 1991. Vallee was good at making friends. While at MIT, he went to Karolinska Institute in Stockholm as a visiting fellow and met Hugo Theorell. He and Theorell worked on oxidative enzymes, the field in which Theorell received the 1955 Nobel Prize in Physiology or Medicine. On the same trip he also visited Kaj Linderstrøm-Lang at the Carlsberg Laboratory in Copenhagen, where he met Lang's colleague Martin Ottesen, and Ottesen's student Jack Johansen. Johansen later joined him at Boston to work at Peter Bent Brigham Hospital, and became his prolific collaborator.

== The Bert L. & N. Kuggie Vallee Foundation ==
The Bert L. and N. Kuggie Vallee Foundation was established in 1996 by Bert L and N. Kuggie Vallee to promote a collegial community of international scientists, to enhance scientific collaboration and communication, and to advance medical education and biomedical research.

In its initial years, the Foundation's mission to promote dialogue between active and prominent biomedical scientists around the world was achieved by sponsoring visiting professorships at institutions with which Bert Vallee had developed close collaborations and by organizing biennial meetings of this group of biomedical scientists. More recently, the programs have grown and include scientists worldwide.

The Foundation's programs include:

- Month-long Vallee Visiting Professorships, which pair senior scientists with premier biomedical research institutes worldwide
- Young Investigator Awards providing funding for junior faculty carrying out basic biomedical research
- The Bert and Natalie Vallee Award in Biomedical Science to recognize international achievements in the sciences basic to medicine
- Vallee Fellowships to the Lindau Nobel Laureate Meetings for gifted young post-docs
- Symposia and meetings for Vallee Visiting Professors and Young Investigators to interact in a collegial environment, report on their scientific interests, and address current issues in biomedical science.
