= Celia White Tabor =

American biochemist and physician-scientist (1918–2012)

- Born: November 15, 1918; Boston, Massachusetts, US
- Died: December 2, 2012 (aged 94); Bethesda, Maryland, US
- Education: Radcliffe College (BA); Columbia University (MD)
- Spouse: Herbert Tabor (m. 1946)
- Children: 4
- Awards: William C. Rose Award (1995)
- Scientific career
- Fields: Biochemistry
- Institutions: George Washington University; National Institute of Diabetes and Digestive and Kidney Diseases

Celia White Tabor (November 15, 1918 – December 2, 2012) was an American biochemist and physician-scientist who was an expert on the biosynthesis of polyamines. She was a researcher at the National Institute of Diabetes and Digestive and Kidney Diseases from 1952 until her retirement in 2005.

== Early life and education ==
Celia White was born in Boston on November 15, 1918. She graduated from Radcliffe College in 1940. In 1943, White was one of 6 women in her class to graduate from the Columbia University Vagelos College of Physicians and Surgeons. She was the first woman medical intern at Massachusetts General Hospital. White was an assistant medical resident at Vanderbilt University until 1946.

== Career and research ==
From 1946 to 1952, Tabor was a biochemical researcher at George Washington University and an attending physician at District of Columbia General Hospital. She joined the National Institute of Diabetes and Digestive and Kidney Diseases in 1952 where she researched the biochemistry and function of polyamines in the context of human health and disease. She was an expert on the biosynthesis of polyamines. She retired in 2005.

== Award and honors ==
In 1986, Tabor and her husband won the Hillebrand Prize from the Chemical Society of Washington. In 1995, Tabor and her husband received a William C. Rose Award.

== Personal life ==
Celia White married physician-scientist Herbert Tabor in 1946. The couple met through mutual friends six years earlier on a Boston streetcar. They moved to the NIH campus in 1949 where they raised their daughter and three sons. Tabor died in her home in Bethesda died on December 2, 2012, from cardiopulmonary arrest.
