= F. Peter Guengerich =

- Born: January 1st 1949; Pekin, Illinois
- Known for: Toxicology
- Awards: William C. Rose Award
- Scientific career
- Fields: Biochemistry
- Institutions: Vanderbilt University

Frederick Peter Guengerich is a professor of biochemistry and the director of the Center in Molecular Toxicology at Vanderbilt University, Nashville, Tennessee. Guengerich is the author or co-author of over 500 scientific articles, and a researcher in toxicology working on cytochromes P450, DNA damage and carcinogenesis, and drug metabolism. In 2005 he received the William C. Rose Award for his research.
