= Albert L. Lehninger =

American biochemist (1917–1986)

Albert Lester Lehninger
- Born: February 17, 1917; Bridgeport, Connecticut
- Died: March 4, 1986 (aged 69)
- Known for: Metabolism studies, textbook authorship
- Awards: Pfizer Award in Enzyme Chemistry (1948)
- Scientific career
- Fields: Biochemistry
- Workplaces: University of Wisconsin–Madison; University of Chicago; Johns Hopkins School of Medicine
- Doctoral advisor: Edgar J. Witzemann

Albert Lester Lehninger (February 17, 1917 – March 4, 1986) was an American chemist in the field of bioenergetics. He made fundamental contributions to the current understanding of metabolism at a molecular level. In 1948, he discovered, with Eugene P. Kennedy, that mitochondria are the site of oxidative phosphorylation in eukaryotes, which ushered in the modern study of energy transduction. He is the author of a number of classic texts, including Biochemistry, The Mitochondrion, Bioenergetics and, most notably, his series Principles of Biochemistry. This last is a widely used text for introductory biochemistry courses at the college and university levels.

== Early life and education ==
Lehninger was born in Bridgeport, Connecticut, US. He earned his BA in English from Wesleyan University (1939) and went on to earn both his MA (1940) and PhD (1942) at the University of Wisconsin–Madison. His doctoral research involved the metabolism of acetoacetate and fatty acid oxidation by liver cells.

== Academic career ==
After earning his doctorate in biochemistry, Lehninger held various faculty positions at the University of Wisconsin–Madison and the University of Chicago. In 1952, he went to the Johns Hopkins School of Medicine, assuming the title of DeLamar Professor of the Department of Biological Chemistry. He served in this position until 1978, when he was appointed to the role of University Professor of Medical Sciences. He held this title until his death in 1986.

== Honors and awards ==
- 1948 – Paul-Lewis Award in Enzyme Chemistry
- 1951 – Guggenheim Fellowship
- 1956 – Elected to the National Academy of Sciences
- 1959 – Elected to the American Academy of Arts and Sciences
- 1969 – Remsen Award of the American Chemical Society
- 1970 – American Philosophical Society
- 1986 – Passano Foundation Award
