= Bruce A. Fowler =

American toxicologist, academic, and author

- Occupations: toxicologist, academic, and author

Academic background
- Education: B.S., Fisheries (Marine Biology); Ph.D., Pathology
- Alma mater: University of Washington, Seattle, WA; Oregon Health & Science University, Portland, Oregon

Bruce A. Fowler is an American toxicologist, academic, and author. He is a co-owner and private consultant for Toxicology and Risk Assessment Consulting Services, and an adjunct professor at the Rollins School of Public Health at Emory University.

Fowler is most known for his research in molecular biomarkers, computational toxicology, chemical-induced cell injury/death, and risk assessment for electronic waste. He has authored more than 260 research papers and book chapters, and is the author/co-author/editor of 10 books and monographs, including Biological and Environmental Effects of Arsenic, and Molecular Biological Markers for Toxicology and Risk Assessment.

Fowler has been elected as a fellow of the Academy of Toxicological Sciences and a Fellow of the Japan Society for the Promotion of Science. He has been a Fulbright Scholar, a Swedish Medical Research Council Visiting professor at the Karolinska Institute, and a Paul Harris Multiple Fellow of Rotary International. He is the editor of Oceanography & Fisheries Open access Journal.

== Education ==
Fowler received his Bachelor of Science degree in Fisheries (Marine Biology) from the University of Washington in 1968 and obtained his Ph.D. in Pathology from the Oregon Health & Science University in 1972.

== Career ==
Fowler began his scientific career as a staff fellow in the Environmental Toxicology Branch at the National Institute of Environmental Health Sciences in Research Triangle Park, North Carolina, in 1972. He became a research biologist in various branches at the institute from 1974 to 1987. He has served as chair of the National Academy of Sciences/NRC Committee on Measuring Lead in Children and Other Sensitive Populations. He has worked on WHO panels and IARC working groups. He is the former chair of the Federal Legislative Committee for the Maryland National Association of Active and Retired Federal Employees. Since 2018, he is a member of the board of directors and chair of the Advocacy Committee for the Fulbright Association.

Fowler joined the Department of Pathology at the University of North Carolina at Chapel Hill as an adjunct assistant professor in 1975, and was appointed an adjunct associate professor in 1980. He later became a professor of pathology, and director of the University of Maryland Toxicology Program from 1987 to 2001. He is the former President's Professor of Biomedical Research at the University of Alaska Fairbanks, and a Swedish Medical Research Council Visiting professor at the Karolinska Institute in Stockholm, Sweden.

== Research ==
Fowler explored several areas of toxicology, including the development of molecular biomarkers to evaluate mechanisms of metal-induced cell injury and cell death. He also studied the roles of metal binding and stress proteins in mediating cell injury and death in mammals and aquatic organisms, and investigated genetic polymorphisms that played a role in chemical toxicity susceptibility and identified biomarkers of nephrotoxicity from therapeutic drugs. Additionally, he applied computational toxicology methods to assess chemical exposure risks and conducted risk assessments for e-waste chemical mixtures.

=== Toxicology of metals ===
One of Fowler's highly cited books, Handbook on the Toxicology of Metals presented coverage of basic toxicological data for metals, emphasizing toxic effects in humans, animals, and in vitro biological systems. This work also explored topics, such as metal sources, environmental transport and transformation, ecological effects, and potential human health risks, and investigated the toxicology of metallic nanomaterials and the impact of "e waste" on human health in developing countries. In his research on the role of metal-binding and stress proteins in mediating mechanisms of cell damage and death in mammals, and aquatic organisms, it was found that proteins rich in aspartic and glutamic dicarboxyl amino acids determine the intracellular bioavailability of low-dose lead in organs like the kidney and brain. He outlined mechanisms of nephrotoxicity from metal combinations in a joint study. In his earlier studies, he explored the molecular mechanisms that lead to cell injury in the kidney caused by toxic metals/metalloids like arsenic, cadmium, lead, and mercury. In addition, he underscored the importance of factors like metal-binding proteins, inclusion bodies, and cell-specific receptor-like proteins in influencing cell populations at risk for toxicity and renal cancer. Besides that, he provided an overview of biomarkers and their applications in risk assessment, including the categories of markers for exposure, effect, and susceptibility, and identified the validation and interpretation issues that need to be addressed to fully realize their potential as predictive tools for public health and their application in risk assessment. In this regard, his book Molecular Biological Markers for Toxicology and Risk Assessment offered information on the underlying mechanisms of toxicity and cancer caused by exposure to chemicals.

He reviewed studies on interactions of the toxic metals/metalloids lead, cadmium, and arsenic in both experimental and human exposure. The findings suggested that concurrent exposure to these metals/metalloids can produce more severe effects, mediated by dose, duration of exposure, and genetic factors. His research also demonstrated that metal-binding proteins, lysosomes, and inclusion bodies regulate metal bioavailability and play a major role in metal-induced cell injury. However, the contribution of each compartment depends on exposure, cell type, and organism, shedding light on metal homeostasis.

=== Computational toxicology for risk assessment and e-waste ===
Fowler addressed the public health risks arising from improper recycling and disposal methods of e-waste, resulting in the release of hazardous chemicals in his book, Electronic Waste: Toxicology and Public Health Issues. He presented various risk assessment methods such as chemicals, mixtures, biomarkers, susceptibility factors, and computational toxicology to evaluate potential hazards, and highlighted the need to translate risk assessment findings into effective international policies for ensuring public safety. Additionally, he emphasized the importance of addressing exposure to chemical mixtures in e-waste, since modern electronic devices contain both organic and inorganic chemicals. He has explored the major inorganic elements, including metals and metalloids, binary/multielemental materials, and increasing use of nanomaterials in e-waste, and studied the organic chemicals and compounds in electronic devices that can disrupt endocrine pathways and cause biological effects. His book, Computational Toxicology: Methods and Applications for Risk Assessment, defined and provided a brief history of CompTox methods as well as showcased practical applications of these methods for better decision-making in risk assessment. The book also explored the drivers behind the development of CompTox methods, including technological, economic, and public health concerns.

== Awards and honors ==
- 1990 - JSPS Fellowship
- 1994-1995 – Fulbright Scholar and Swedish Medical Research Council Visiting professor, Karolinska Institute
- 1998 - Colgate Palmolive Visiting Professor at University of Washington, Seattle
- 2000 – Fellow, Academy of Toxicological Sciences

== Bibliography ==
=== Selected books ===
- Biological and Environmental Effects of Arsenic (2013) ISBN 9781483290195
- Computational Toxicology: Methods and Applications for Risk Assessment (2013) ISBN 9780123965080
- Handbook on the Toxicology of Metals (2014) ISBN 9780444594532
- Molecular Biological Markers for Toxicology and Risk Assessment (2016) ISBN 9780128095898
- Electronic Waste: Toxicology and Public Health Issues (2017) ISBN 9780128030837
- Risk Assessment for Human Metal Exposures: Mode of Action and Kinetic Approaches (2018) ISBN 9780128042274

=== Selected articles ===
- Fowler, B. A., & Weissberg, J. B. (1974). Arsine poisoning. New England Journal of Medicine, 291(22), 1171–1174.
- Mahaffey, K. R., Capar, S. G., Gladen, B. C., & Fowler, B. A. (1981). Concurrent exposure to lead, cadmium, and arsenic: effects on toxicity and tissue metal concentrations in the rat. The Journal of laboratory and clinical medicine, 98(4), 463–481.
- Carmichael, N. G., & Fowler, B. (1981). Cadmium accumulation and toxicity in the kidney of the bay scallop Argopecten irradians. Marine Biology, 65, 35–43.
- Oskarsson, A., Squibb, K. S., & Fowler, B. A. (1982). Intracellular binding of lead in the kidney: the partial isolation and characterization of postmitochondrial lead binding components. Biochemical and biophysical research communications, 104(1), 290–298.
- Fowler, B. A., Kardish, R. M., & Woods, J. S. (1983). Alteration of hepatic microsomal structure and function by indium chloride. Ultrastructural, morphometric, and biochemical studies. Laboratory Investigation; a Journal of Technical Methods and Pathology, 48(4), 471–478.
- Goering, P. L., & Fowler, B. A. (1987). Metal constitution of metallothionein influences inhibition of δ-aminolaevulinic acid dehydratase (porphobilinogen synthase) by lead. Biochemical Journal, 245(2), 339–345.
- Abernathy, C. O., Liu, Y. P., Longfellow, D., Aposhian, H. V., Beck, B., Fowler, B., ... & Waalkes, M. (1999). Arsenic: health effects, mechanisms of actions, and research issues. Environmental health perspectives, 107(7), 593–597.
- Fowler, B. A. (2009). Monitoring of human populations for early markers of cadmium toxicity: a review. Toxicology and applied pharmacology, 238(3), 294–300.
- Hack, C. E., Haber, L. T., Maier, A., Shulte, P., Fowler, B., Lotz, W. G., & Savage, R. E., Jr (2010). A Bayesian network model for biomarker-based dose response. Risk analysis, 30(7), 1037–1051.
