= MT1F =

Protein-coding gene in the species Homo sapiens

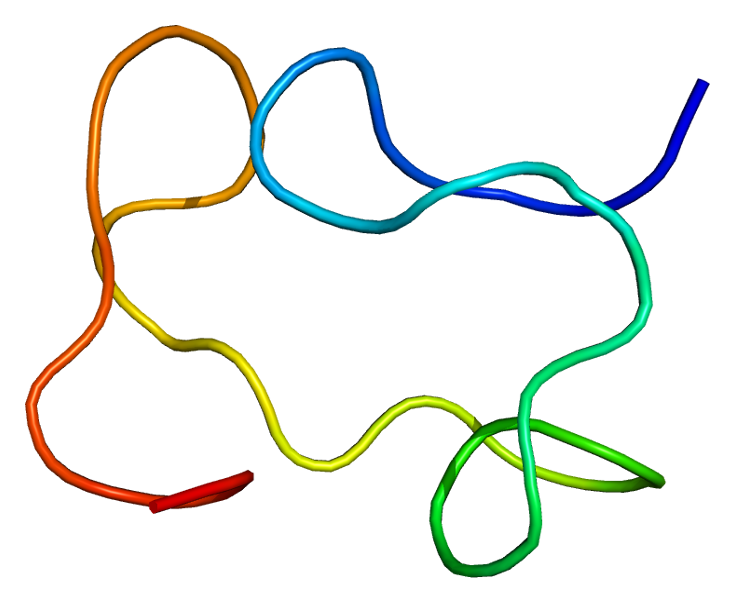

Identifiers
- Aliases: MT1F, MT1, metallothionein 1F
- External IDs: OMIM: 156352; HomoloGene: 136799; GeneCards: MT1F; OMA:MT1F - orthologs

Gene location (Human)
Chr.	Chromosome 16 (human)
Band	16q13	Start	56,657,731 bp
Band	16q13	End	56,660,698 bp
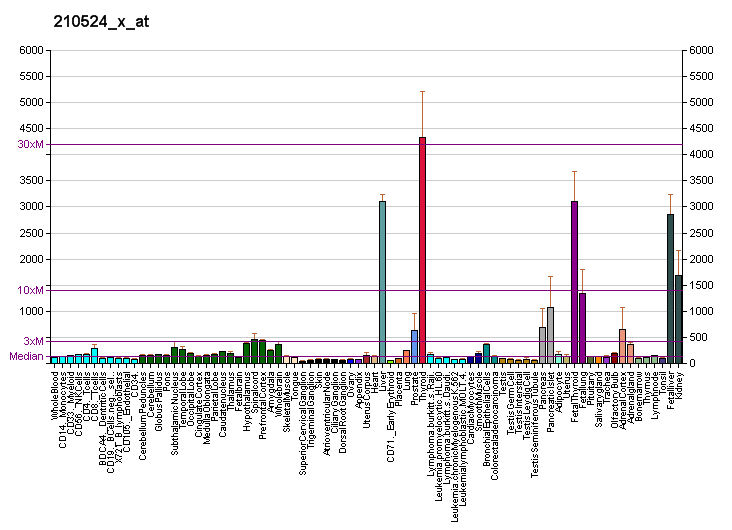

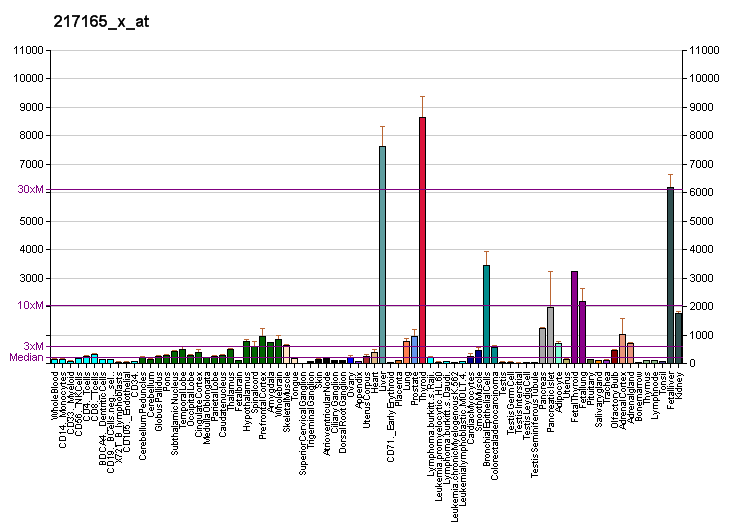

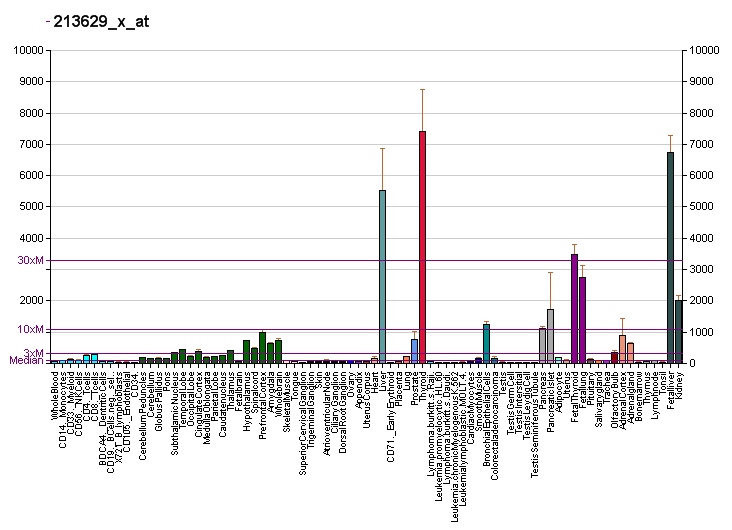
RNA expression pattern
Bgee	Human / Mouse (ortholog); Top expressed in: kidney tubule; right lobe of thyroid gland; left lobe of thyroid gland; mucosa of transverse colon; glomerulus; metanephric glomerulus; human kidney; right lobe of liver; mucosa of ileum; internal globus pallidus / n/a; More reference expression data
BioGPS	More reference expression data
Gene ontology
Molecular function	zinc ion binding; protein binding; metal ion binding
Cellular component	cytoplasm; perinuclear region of cytoplasm; nucleus
Biological process	negative regulation of growth; cellular response to cadmium ion; cellular response to zinc ion; cellular zinc ion homeostasis; detoxification of copper ion; cellular response to copper ion
Sources:Amigo / QuickGO
Orthologs
Species	Human	Mouse
Entrez	4494	n/a
Ensembl	ENSG00000198417	n/a
UniProt	P04733	n/a
RefSeq (mRNA)	NM_005949; NM_001301272	n/a
RefSeq (protein)	NP_001288201; NP_005940	n/a
Location (UCSC)	Chr 16: 56.66 – 56.66 Mb	n/a
PubMed search		n/a
- Wikidata
View/Edit Human

Metallothionein-1F is a protein that in humans is encoded by the MT1F gene.
