= MT1H =

Protein-coding gene in the species Homo sapiens

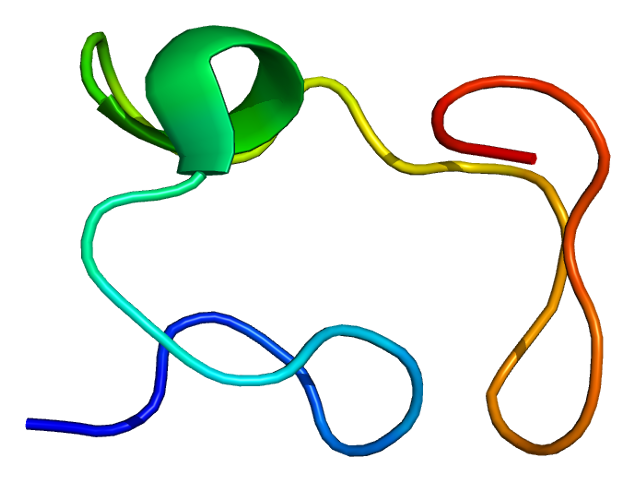

Identifiers
- Aliases: MT1H, MT-0, MT-1H, MT-IH, MT1, metallothionein 1H
- External IDs: OMIM: 156354; HomoloGene: 136530; GeneCards: MT1H; OMA:MT1H - orthologs

Gene location (Human)
Chr.	Chromosome 16 (human)
Band	16q13	Start	56,669,814 bp
Band	16q13	End	56,671,129 bp
RNA expression pattern
Bgee	Human / Mouse (ortholog); Top expressed in: mucosa of ileum; mucosa of transverse colon; kidney tubule; buccal mucosa cell; metanephric glomerulus; external globus pallidus; cartilage tissue; pericardium; internal globus pallidus; olfactory bulb / n/a; More reference expression data
BioGPS	n/a
Gene ontology
Molecular function	zinc ion binding; protein binding; metal ion binding
Cellular component	cytoplasm; perinuclear region of cytoplasm; nucleus
Biological process	negative regulation of growth; cellular response to cadmium ion; cellular response to zinc ion; cellular zinc ion homeostasis; detoxification of copper ion; cellular response to copper ion
Sources:Amigo / QuickGO
Orthologs
Species	Human	Mouse
Entrez	4496	n/a
Ensembl	ENSG00000205358	n/a
UniProt	P80294	n/a
RefSeq (mRNA)	NM_005951	n/a
RefSeq (protein)	NP_005942	n/a
Location (UCSC)	Chr 16: 56.67 – 56.67 Mb	n/a
PubMed search		n/a
- Wikidata
View/Edit Human

Metallothionein-1H is a protein that in humans is encoded by the MT1H gene.
