= Metal-binding protein =

Proteins or protein domains that chelate a metal ion

Example metal binding proteins

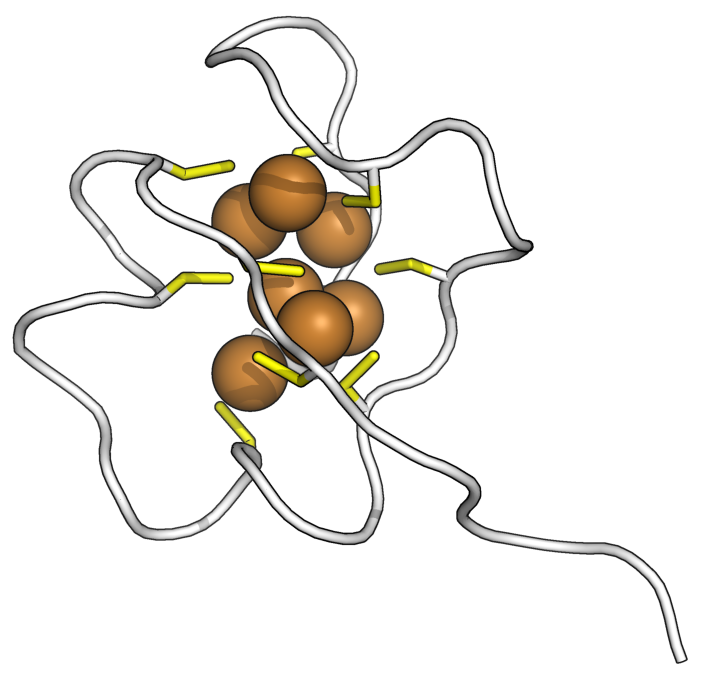
Saccharomyces cerevisiae MT metallothionein bound to copper ions. Cysteines in yellow, copper in brown. (PDB: 1AQS)

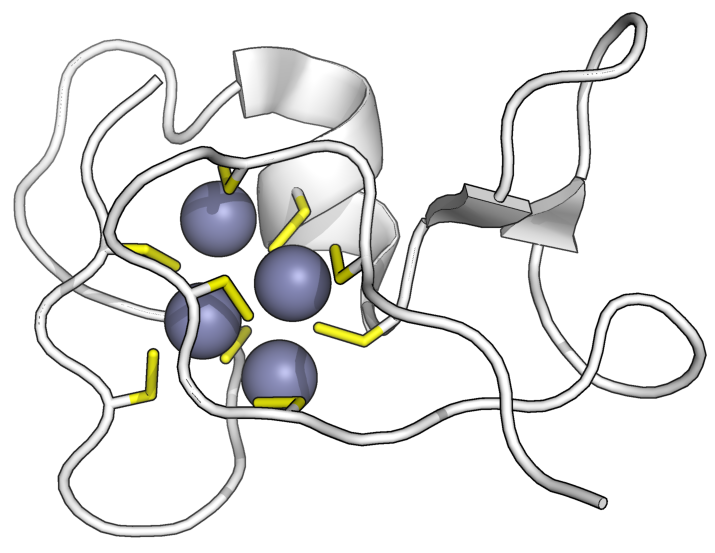
Cyanobacterial SmtA metallothionein bound to zinc ions. Cysteines in yellow, zinc in purple. (PDB: 1JJD)

Metal-binding proteins are proteins or protein domains that chelate a metal ion. They are a subgroup of metalloproteins.

Binding of metal ions via chelation is usually achieved via histidines or cysteines. In some cases this is a necessary part of their folding and maintenance of a tertiary structure. Alternatively, a metal-binding protein may maintain its structure without the metal (apo form) and bind it as a ligand (e.g. as part of metal homeostasis). In other cases a coordinated metal cofactor is used in the active site of an enzyme to assist catalysis.

== Histidine-rich metal-binding proteins ==
Poly-histidine tags (of six or more consecutive His residues) are utilized for protein purification by binding to columns with nickel or cobalt, with micromolar affinity. Natural poly-histidine peptides, found in the venom of the viper Atheris squamigera have been shown to bind Zn(2+), Ni(2+) and Cu(2+) and affect the function of venom metalloproteases. Furthermore, histidine-rich low-complexity regions are found in metal-binding and especially nickel-cobalt binding proteins. These histidine-rich low complexity regions have an average length of 36 residues, of which 53% histidine, 23% aspartate, 9% glutamate. Intriguingly, structured domains with metal binding properties also have very similar frequencies of these amino acids that are involved in the coordination of the metal. Accordingly, it has been hypothesized that these metal-binding structured domains could have originated and evolved/optimized from metal-binding low-complexity protein regions of similar amino acid content.
