= Susan J. Baserga =

American physician and academic

Susan Baserga
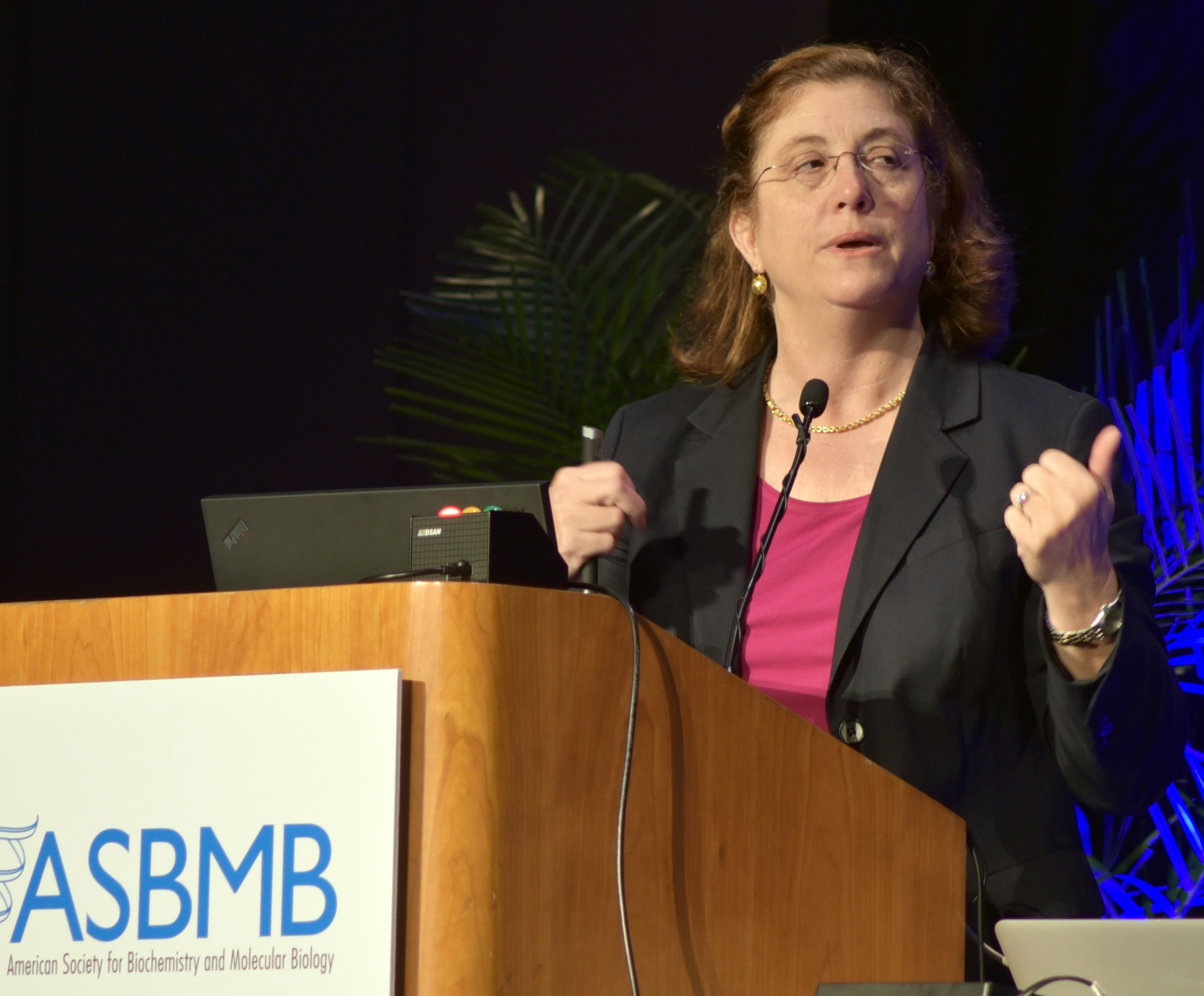
- Baserga receiving the 2016 American Society for Biochemistry and Molecular Biology William C. Rose Award
- Education: Yale College; Yale School of Medicine; Yale University
- Scientific career
- Workplaces: Yale School of Medicine

Susan J. Baserga is an American physician who is the William H. Fleming Professor of Molecular Biophysics and Biochemistry at Yale University. Her research considers the molecular basis of ribosomes, and the mechanistic basis of inherited human disease.

== Early life and education ==
Baserga's father, Renato Baserga, was a pathologist and cancer researcher. In 1977, Baserga became inspired by pre-RNA splicing. As an MD–PhD candidate, Baserga studied nonsense-mediated decay mammalian cells. She later moved to Joan A. Steitz's laboratory at Yale University, where she started working on ribosome biogenesis.

== Research and career ==
Baserga started her academic career at Yale in 1993. She was promoted to professor in 2007. Her research sought to identify how ribosome production is regulated in mammalian cells. She uses Xenopus tropicalis as a model system for ribosomopathies, and is interested in Fanconi anemia repair factors.

In 2020, Baserga was named the William H. Fleming Professor of Molecular Biophysics and Biochemistry. She is the Chair of the American Society for Biochemistry and Molecular Biology Women in Biochemistry and Molecular Biology Committee. In 2023, she joined the National Academies of Sciences, Engineering, and Medicine Committee on RNA modifications, "Towards Sequencing and Mapping of RNA Modifications".

== Awards and honors ==
- 2014 Charles W. Bohmfalk Prize
- 2016 American Society for Biochemistry and Molecular Biology William C. Rose Award
- 2018 Connecticut Technology Council Women of Innovation Category Winner in Research Innovation and Leadership
- 2018 National Academy of Inventors
- 2023 Elected Fellow of the American Society for Biochemistry and Molecular Biology
- 2023 Elected to the National Academy of Medicine
- 2024 Elected as a Member of the American Academy of Arts and Sciences

== Selected publications ==
- François Dragon; Jennifer E G Gallagher; Patricia A Compagnone-Post; et al. (27 June 2002). "A large nucleolar U3 ribonucleoprotein required for 18S ribosomal RNA biogenesis". Nature. 417 (6892): 967–70. doi:10.1038/nature00769. ISSN 1476-4687. PMID 12068309. Wikidata Q27937306.
- John L. Woolford, Jr.; Susan J Baserga (1 November 2013). "Ribosome biogenesis in the yeast Saccharomyces cerevisiae". Genetics. 195 (3): 643–681. doi:10.1534/genetics.113.153197. ISSN 0016-6731. PMC 3813855. PMID 24190922. Wikidata Q37269766.
- Yvonne N Osheim; Sarah L French; Kristin M Keck; Erica A Champion; Krasimir Spasov; François Dragon; Susan J Baserga; Ann L Beyer (1 December 2004). "Pre-18S ribosomal RNA is structurally compacted into the SSU processome prior to being cleaved from nascent transcripts in Saccharomyces cerevisiae". Molecular Cell. 16 (6): 943–954. doi:10.1016/j.molcel.2004.11.031. ISSN 1097-2765. PMID 15610737. Wikidata Q30435434.
