= Eugene P. Kennedy =

American biochemist

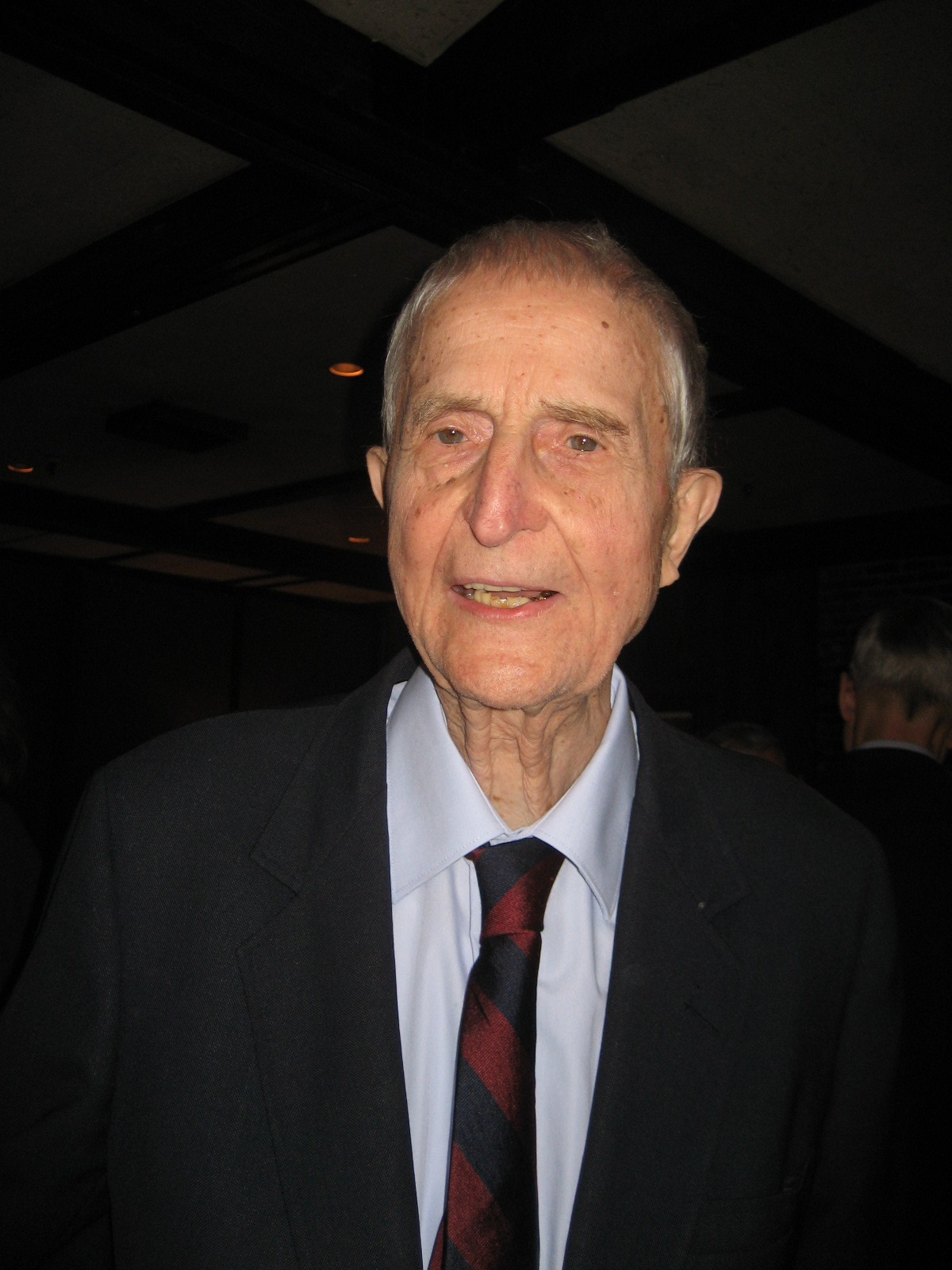
- Born: September 4, 1919; Chicago
- Died: September 22, 2011 (aged 92); Cambridge, Massachusetts
- Education: DePaul University, University of Chicago
- Known for: Work on the biosynthesis of phospholipids
- Awards: Pfizer Award in Enzyme Chemistry, Gairdner Foundation International Award, Passano Award, Heinrich Wieland Prize, William C. Rose Award
- Scientific career
- Fields: Biochemistry
- Institutions: Harvard Medical School, University of Chicago

Eugene Patrick Kennedy (1919–2011) was an American biochemist known for his work on lipid metabolism and membrane function. He attended DePaul University and then became a PhD student at the University of Chicago. From 1959 to 1993 he worked at Harvard Medical School. He was born to Irish immigrant parents and attended Catholic schools in Chicago, Illinois.

He was nominated for the 1968 Nobel Prize in Chemistry.

== Awards and honors ==
- 1958 Pfizer Award in Enzyme Chemistry
- 1961 elected to the American Academy of Arts & Sciences
- 1964 elected to the National Academy of Sciences
- 1976 Gairdner Foundation International Award
- 1986 Passano Award
- 1986 Heinrich Wieland Prize
- 1992 William C. Rose Award
- 1993 elected to the American Philosophical Society
