= Phytochelatin =

Poly-glutathione peptides composed of (Glu-Cys)n-Gly where n is two to seven

Chemical structure of phytochelatin. n = 2–11.

Phytochelatins are oligomers of glutathione, produced by the enzyme phytochelatin synthase. They are found in plants, fungi, nematodes and all groups of algae including cyanobacteria. Phytochelatins act as chelators, and are important for heavy metal detoxification. They are abbreviated PC2 through PC11.

A mutant Arabidopsis thaliana lacking phytochelatin synthase is very sensitive to cadmium, but it grows just as well as the wild-type plant at normal concentrations of zinc and copper, two essential metal ions, indicating that phytochelatin is only involved in resistance to metal poisoning.

Because phytochelatin synthase uses glutathione with a blocked thiol group in the synthesis of phytochelatin, the presence of heavy metal ions that bind to glutathione causes the enzyme to work faster. Therefore, the amount of phytochelatin increases when the cell needs more phytochelatin to survive in an environment with high concentrations of metal ions.

Phytochelatin binds to Pb ions leading to sequestration of Pb ions in plants and thus serves as an important component of the detoxification mechanism in plants. Phytochelatin seems to be transported into the vacuole of plants, so that the metal ions it carries are stored safely away from the proteins of the cytosol.

== Related peptides ==
There are groups of other peptides with a similar structure to phytochelatin, but where the last amino acid is not glycine:

Phytochelatin-like peptides
Type	Structure	Has been found in	Precursor
Phytochelatin	(γGlu-Cys)_{n}-Gly	many organisms	Glutathione
Homophytochelatin	(γGlu-Cys)_{n}-Ala	legumes	Homoglutathione
Desglycine phytochelatin	(γGlu-Cys)_{n}	maize, yeasts	
Hydroxymethyl-phytochelatin	(γGlu-Cys)_{n}-Ser	grasses	Hydroxymethylglutathione
iso-Phytochelatin (Glu)	(γGlu-Cys)_{n}-Glu	maize	Glutamylcysteinylglutamate
iso-Phytochelatin (Gln)	(γGlu-Cys)_{n}-Gln	horseradish	

== History ==
Phytochelatin was first discovered in 1981 in fission yeast, and was named cadystin. It was then found in higher plants in 1985 and was named phytochelatin. In 1989 the biosynthetic enzyme, phytochelatin synthase, was discovered.

== See also ==
- Farkas, Etelka; Buglyó, Péter (2017). "Chapter 8. Lead(II) Complexes of Amino Acids, Peptides, and Other Related Ligands of Biological Interest". In Astrid, S.; Helmut, S.; Sigel, R. K. O. (eds.). Lead: Its Effects on Environment and Health. Metal Ions in Life Sciences. Vol. 17. de Gruyter. pp. 201–240. doi:10.1515/9783110434330-008. PMID 28731301. pp. 228–230
- Dunaliella
