= Thionein =

Thionein is a cysteine-rich coenzyme associated with metallothioneins. Thionein and metallothionein act as a redox pair, and much of the antioxidant functions of attributed to metallothionein are actually due to thionein. The binding of heavy metal ions to both thionein and metallothionein is due to their high cysteine content.
