= MT1E =

Protein-coding gene in the species Homo sapiens

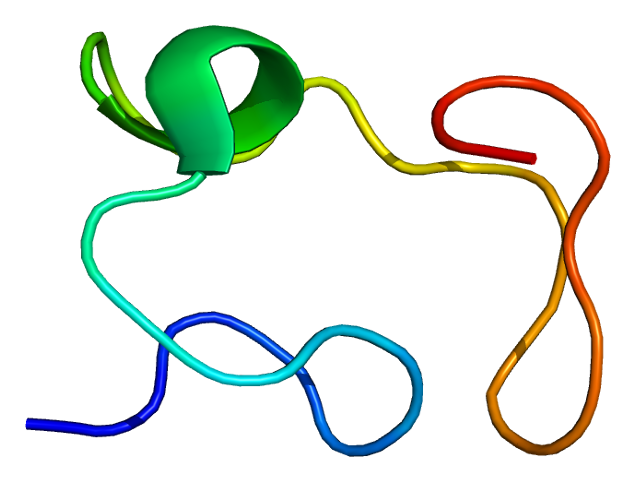

Identifiers
- Aliases: MT1E, MT1, MTD, MT-1E, MT-IE, metallothionein 1E
- External IDs: OMIM: 156351; HomoloGene: 138433; GeneCards: MT1E; OMA:MT1E - orthologs

Gene location (Human)
Chr.	Chromosome 16 (human)
Band	16q13	Start	56,625,475 bp
Band	16q13	End	56,627,112 bp
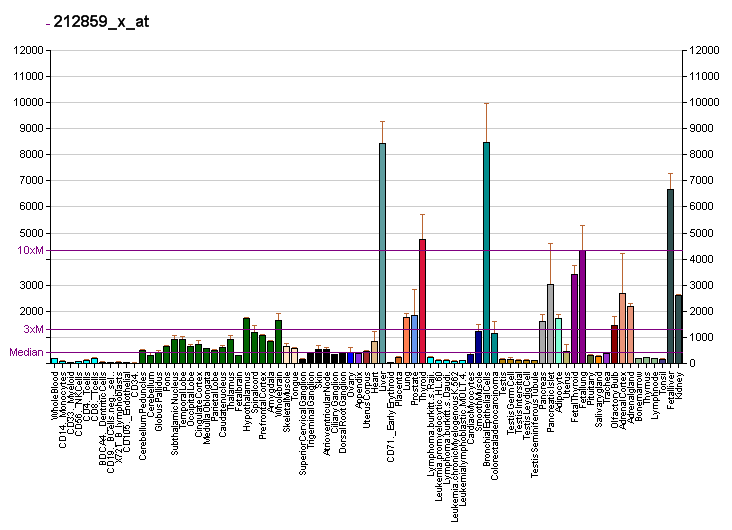
RNA expression pattern
Bgee	Human / Mouse (ortholog); Top expressed in: mucosa of transverse colon; mucosa of ileum; external globus pallidus; pericardium; right lobe of liver; synovial joint; internal globus pallidus; kidney tubule; left uterine tube; pars reticulata / n/a; More reference expression data
BioGPS	More reference expression data
Gene ontology
Molecular function	zinc ion binding; metal ion binding
Cellular component	cytoplasm; perinuclear region of cytoplasm; nucleus
Biological process	negative regulation of growth; cellular response to cadmium ion; cellular response to zinc ion; cellular zinc ion homeostasis; detoxification of copper ion; cellular response to copper ion
Sources:Amigo / QuickGO
Orthologs
Species	Human	Mouse
Entrez	4493	n/a
Ensembl	ENSG00000169715	n/a
UniProt	P04732	n/a
RefSeq (mRNA)	NM_175617; NM_001363555	n/a
RefSeq (protein)	NP_783316; NP_001350484	n/a
Location (UCSC)	Chr 16: 56.63 – 56.63 Mb	n/a
PubMed search		n/a
- Wikidata
View/Edit Human

Metallothionein-1E is a protein that in humans is encoded by the MT1E gene.
