= MT1M =

Protein-coding gene in the species Homo sapiens

Identifiers
- Aliases: MT1M, MT-1M, MT-IM, MT1, MT1K, metallothionein 1M
- External IDs: OMIM: 156357; GeneCards: MT1M; OMA:MT1M - orthologs

Gene location (Human)
| Chr. | Chromosome 16 (human) |
| Band | 16q13 | Start | 56,632,659 bp |
| Band | 16q13 | End | 56,633,981 bp |
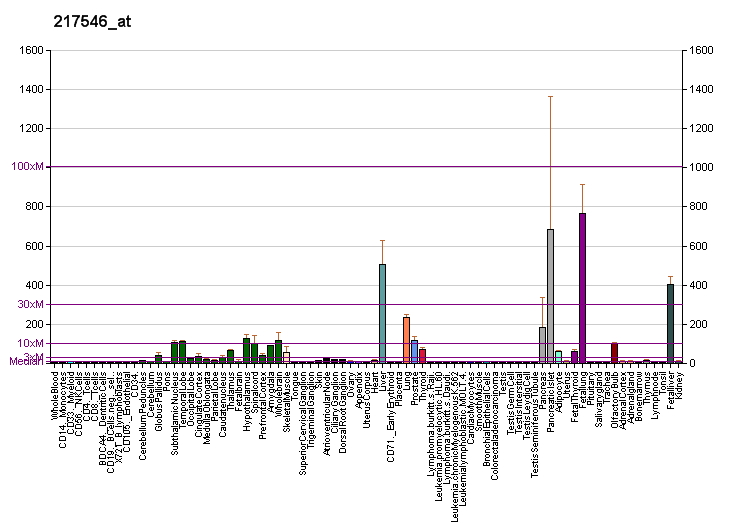
RNA expression pattern
| Bgee | Human / Mouse (ortholog); Top expressed in: mucosa of transverse colon; left uterine tube; pericardium; right lobe of liver; external globus pallidus; gastric mucosa; synovial joint; left coronary artery; amygdala; tibial arteries / n/a; More reference expression data |
| BioGPS | More reference expression data |
Gene ontology
| Molecular function | zinc ion binding; metal ion binding |
| Cellular component | cytoplasm; perinuclear region of cytoplasm; nucleus |
| Biological process | negative regulation of growth; cellular response to zinc ion; cellular zinc ion homeostasis; detoxification of copper ion; cellular response to cadmium ion; cellular response to copper ion |
Sources:Amigo / QuickGO
Orthologs
| Species | Human | Mouse |
| Entrez | 4499 | n/a |
| Ensembl | ENSG00000205364 | n/a |
| UniProt | Q8N339 | n/a |
| RefSeq (mRNA) | NM_176870 | n/a |
| RefSeq (protein) | NP_789846 | n/a |
| Location (UCSC) | Chr 16: 56.63 – 56.63 Mb | n/a |
| PubMed search | | n/a |
- Wikidata
| View/Edit Human |

Metallothionein-1M is a protein that in humans is encoded by the MT1M gene.
