= MT1B =

Protein-coding gene in the species Homo sapiens

Identifiers
- Aliases: MT1B, MT1, MT1Q, MTP, metallothionein 1B, MT-IB, MT-1B
- External IDs: OMIM: 156349; HomoloGene: 48385; GeneCards: MT1B; OMA:MT1B - orthologs

Gene location (Human)
Chr.	Chromosome 16 (human)
Band	16q13	Start	56,651,886 bp
Band	16q13	End	56,653,204 bp
RNA expression pattern
Bgee	Human / Mouse (ortholog); Top expressed in: right lobe of liver; duodenum; appendix; mucosa of esophagus; left uterine tube; urinary bladder; human musculoskeletal system; skeletal muscle; islet of Langerhans; muscle of leg / n/a; More reference expression data
BioGPS	n/a
Gene ontology
Molecular function	zinc ion binding; metal ion binding
Cellular component	cytoplasm; perinuclear region of cytoplasm; nucleus
Biological process	negative regulation of growth; cellular response to zinc ion; cellular zinc ion homeostasis; detoxification of copper ion; cellular response to cadmium ion; cellular response to copper ion
Sources:Amigo / QuickGO
Orthologs
Species	Human	Mouse
Entrez	4490	n/a
Ensembl	ENSG00000169688	n/a
UniProt	P07438	n/a
RefSeq (mRNA)	NM_005947	n/a
RefSeq (protein)	NP_005938	n/a
Location (UCSC)	Chr 16: 56.65 – 56.65 Mb	n/a
PubMed search		n/a
- Wikidata
View/Edit Human

Metallothionein-1B is a protein that in humans is encoded by the MT1B gene.
