= Amy Rosenzweig =

American biochemist

Professor Amy C. Rosenzweig
- Born: January 6th 1967 (age 58–59); Pittsburgh, PA
- Education: Amherst College (B.S.) (1988); Massachusetts Institute of Technology (Ph.D) (1994)
- Awards: MacArthur Fellowship
- Scientific career
- Fields: Biochemistry and Chemistry
- Thesis: Structural studies of the hydroxylase component of methane monooxygenase from methyloccous capsulatus (1994)
- Doctoral advisor: Stephen J. Lippard
- Website: groups.molbiosci.northwestern.edu/rosenzweig/

Amy C. Rosenzweig is a professor of Chemistry and Molecular Biosciences and director of the Keck Biophysics Facility at Northwestern University. She was born in 1967 in Pittsburgh, Pennsylvania. Her current research interests include structural biology and bioinorganic chemistry, metal uptake and transport, oxygen activation by metalloenzymes, and characterization of membrane protein. For her work, she has been recognized by a number of national and international awards, including the MacArthur "Genius" Award in 2003.

== Education and training ==
She received her BA in chemistry from Amherst College in 1988, and her Ph.D. from Massachusetts Institute of Technology in 1994. At MIT, Rosenzweig worked under the supervision of Stephen J. Lippard where she pioneered the structural studies of the hydroxylase component of methane monooxygenase from methyloccous capsulatus.

Her research involves the study of an enzyme that Methanotrophic bacteria use to catalyze a reaction that converts potent greenhouse gases into usable fuel.

== Biological Methane Oxidation ==
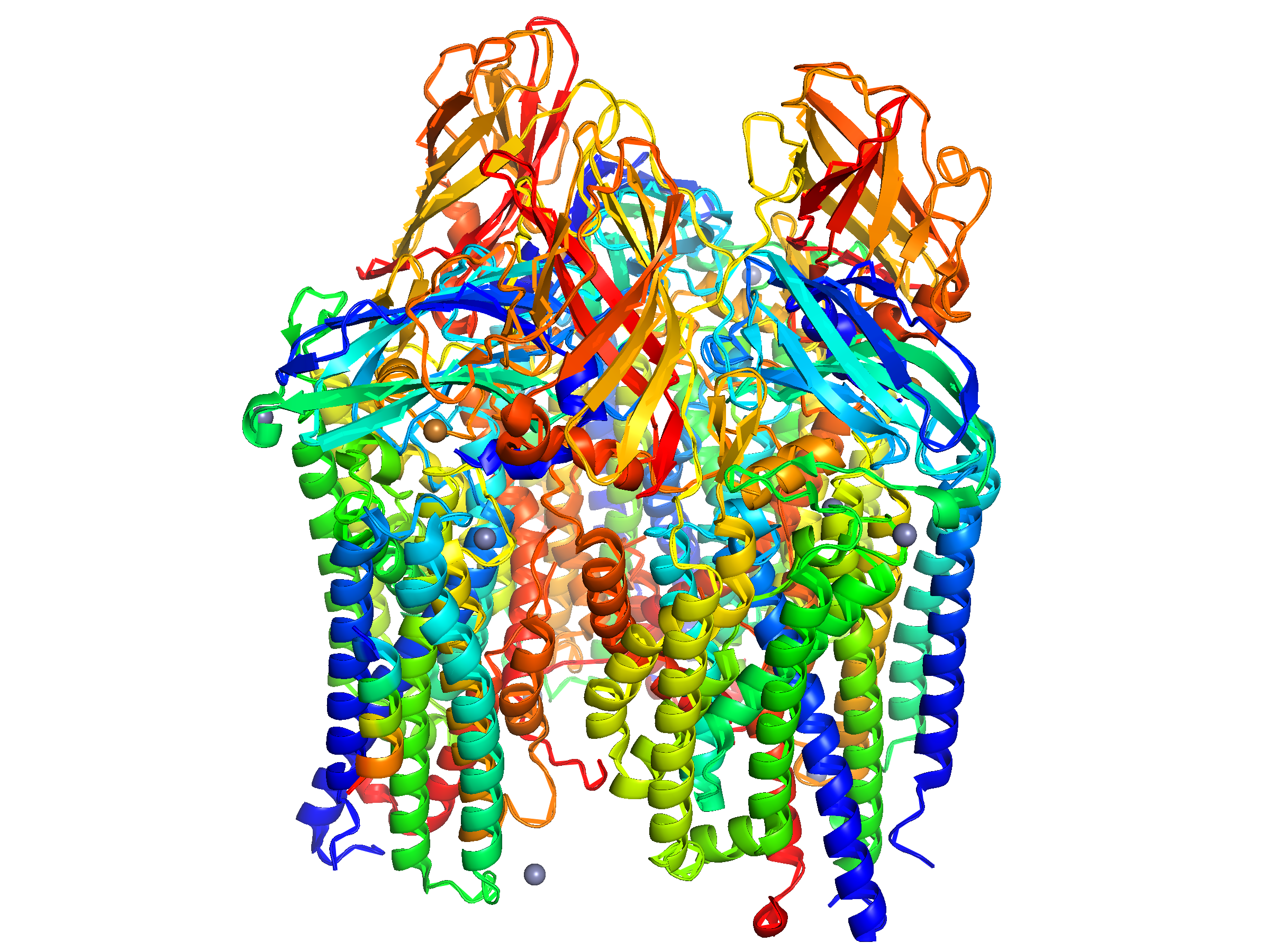
Structure of pMMO

Rosenzweig determined the molecular structures of Nature's main methane oxidation catalysts. Methane monooxygenases (MMO) are metalloenzymes found in the family of methanotrophic bacteria. These enzymes belong in the oxidoreductase class. They activate carbon-hydrogen bonds to selectively install oxygen onto their substrate. Two major species of MMO exist—soluble MMO (sMMO) and particulate MMO (pMMO). Despite mediating the same chemical reaction, these two enzymes' structure and mechanism are significantly different.

Since the early 1990s, Rosenzweig has studied MMO enzymes in various biological systems. Her team was the first to solve the crystal structure of particulate MMO in 1993. In the following years, she made major advances in determining the enzyme's bioactivity and chemical constitution, including vast contributions to research on the metal-coordinated active site.

The currently proposed mechanism for sMMO involves an Iron (II) coordination complex that is twice oxidized to form a metalloperoxide species. This species then undergoes reduction in the presence of substrate methane to afford the oxidized alkyl methanol. The crystal structure of the sMMO protein-protein complex has been determined.

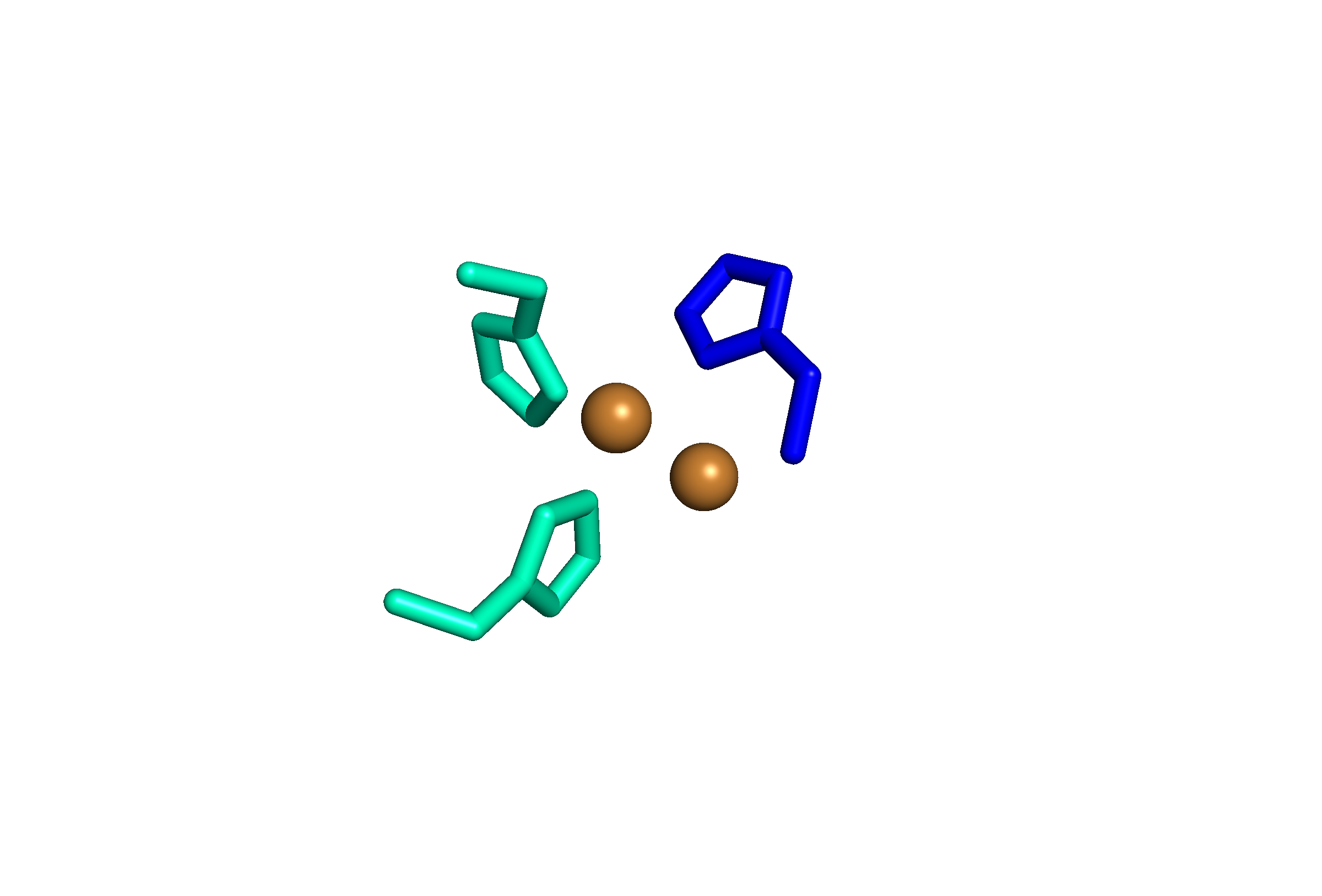
Active site of pMMO

Currently, there remains a mystery in the direct understanding of pMMO-substrate interaction, particularly in diagnosing a complex mechanism. According to Rosenzweig, this elusive problem remains "one of the major unsolved problems in bioinorganic chemistry."

== Metal Transport ==
In her work with pMMOs, Rosenzweig elucidated the molecular basis for safe handling of potentially toxic metal ions through direct handoff between protein partners. She discovered how metal ions are transported across different membranes.Methanotrophs secrete methanobactin. Methanobactin chelated with high affinity to copper, and forms a complex (CuMbn) that can be reinternalized by the cell through active transport. There are specific interactions between CuMbn and proteins MbnT and MbnE. These findings reveal mechanisms for recognition and transport of CuMbn.

== Metalloprotein Function ==
Rosenzweig determined structures of important metalloproteins, exerting sustained influence on the field of bioinorganic chemistry. Particular proteins which she determined the structure of are E. coli Mn (II) 2-NrdF and Fe (II) 2-NrdF, which have different coordination sites. This suggests distinct initial binding sites for oxidants during cofactor activation with E. coli and nucleotides.

== Awards ==
- Alfred Bader Award in Bioinorganic or Bioorganic Chemistry Recipient American Chemical Society, 2021
- Elected Member, National Academy of Sciences, 2017
- Elected Fellow, American Academy of Arts and Sciences, 2014
- Royal Society of Chemistry Joseph Chatt Award, 2014
- Ivano Bertini Award, 2014
- Elected Fellow, American Association For the Advancement of Science, 2007
- American Chemical Society Nobel Laureate Signature Award for Graduate Education, 2006
- Honorary degree, Doctor of Science, Amherst College, 2005
- MacArthur Fellow, 2003
- Camille Dreyfus Teacher Scholar Award, 2001
- David and Lucille Packard Fellow, 1999

== Works ==
- Walker, C. B.; de la Torre, J. R.; Klotz, M. G.; Urakawa, H.; Pinel, N.; Arp, D. J.; Brochier-Armanet, C.; Chain, P. S.; Chan, P. P.; Gollabgir, A.; Hemp, J.; Hügler, M.; Karr, E. A.; Könneke, M.; Shin, M.; Lawton, T. J.; Lowe, T.; Martens-Habbena, W.; Sayavedra-Soto, L. A.; Stahl, D. A. Nitrosopumilus maritimus Genome Reveals Unique Mechanisms for Nitrification and Autotrophy in Globally Distributed Marine Crenarchaea. Proc. Natl. Acad. Sci. U.S.A. 2010, 107 (19), 8818–8823.
- Lieberman, R. L & Rosenzweig, A. C. "Crystal structure of a membrane-bound metalloenzyme that catalyses the biological oxidation of methane", Nature 2005, 434, 177-182.
- Lieberman, R. L., Kondapalli, K. C., Shrestha, D. B., Hakemian, A. S., Smith, S. M., Telser, J., Kuzelka, J., Gupta, R., Borovik, A. S., Lippard, S. J., Hoffman, B. M., Rosenzweig, A. C., & Stemmler, T. L. "Characterization of the particulate methane monooxygenase metal centers in multiple redox states by X-ray absorption spectroscopy". Inorg. Chem. 2006, 45, 8372-8381.
- Sazinsky, M. H., Mandal, A. L, Argüello, J. M., & Rosenzweig, A. C. "Structure of the ATP binding domain from the Archaeglobus fulgidus Cu1+-ATPase". J. Biol. Chem.. 2006, 281, 11161-11166.
- Yatsunyk, L. A. & Rosenzweig, A. C. "Copper binding and transfer by the N-terminus of the Wilson disease protein", J. Biol. Chem.. 2007, 282, 8622-8631.
- Rosenzweig, Lippard, "Structure and Biochemistry Methane Monooxygenase Enzyme Systems", Transition metals in microbial metabolism, Editors Günther Winkelmann, Carl J. Carrano, CRC Press, 1997, ISBN 978-90-5702-220-3
- Rosenzweig, Feng, Lippard, "Studies of Methane Monooxygenase and Alkane Oxidation Model Complexes", Applications of enzyme biotechnology, Editors Jeffery W. Kelly, Thomas O. Baldwin, Springer, 1991, ISBN 978-0-306-44095-3
