= Methanoperedens nitroreducens =

Scientific classification
- Domain: Archaea
- Kingdom: Methanobacteriati
- Phylum: Methanobacteriota
- Class: "Methanomicrobia"
- Order: Methanosarcinales
- Family: Methanoperedenaceae
- Genus: Methanoperedens
- Species: M. nitroreducens

Binomial name
- Methanoperedens nitroreducens Haroon et al. 2013

Species of archaea that oxidizes methane

Methanoperedens nitroreducens (from Latin: methano, meaning "methane", peredens, meaning "consuming", nitro, meaning "nitrate", and reducens, meaning "leading back") is a candidate species of methanotrophic archaea that oxidizes methane by coupling to nitrate reduction.

== Morphology ==
M. nitroreducens are irregular cocci with a diameter of 1-3 μm.

== Metabolism ==
Ideal conditions for M. nitroreducens growth consist of temperatures around 72–95 °F (22–35 °C) and neutral to slightly basic pH of 7-8. M. nitroreducens has been cultured in a bioreactor, but a pure culture has not yet been cultivated.

M. nitroreducens is one of only two organisms that are currently known to be able to couple methane oxidation with nitrate or nitrite reduction, the other being Methylomirabilis oxyfera. M. nitroreducens utilizes the anaerobic oxidation of methane (AOM), a process which serves as an important sink of environmental methane, lowering the gas' overall impact on climate change. This process was originally discovered to be paired with sulfate reduction, but is now known to also be paired with nitrate and metal ion (Mn^{4+} or Fe^{3+}) reduction. M. nitroreducens uses reverse methanogenesis with nitrate as the terminal electron acceptor.

M. nitroreducens is the first anaerobic methanotrophic archaea found to have genes for the full reverse methanogenesis pathway. The full pathway of acetyl-CoA has also been found in M. nitroreducens. It has been suggested that AOM is facilitated by Borgs, unusual large extrachromosomal DNA elements found in Methanoperedens.

== Ecology ==
M. nitroreducens survives in oxygen-free environments and can typically be found in deeper down in freshwater ecosystems. M. nitroreducens is more likely to exist and be competitive in an environment enriched in nitrate as opposed to sulfate or other potential terminal electron acceptors. M. nitroreducens competes against other organisms who reduce nitrate with other carbon sources.

Requiring both methane and nitrate, this organism is commonly found in the area between oxic and anoxic zones. While originally known as an anaerobic species, it has oxygen tolerance mechanisms. When it is in contact with oxygen, M. nitroreducens will up-regulate genes needed to protect against oxidative stress. This differs from other anaerobic species who suffer irreversible damage when exposed to oxygen, hinting at future applications for this archaeal species.

== Discovery ==
M. nitroreducens was first described by Haroon et al. in 2013 after adding methane, ammonium, and nitrate to a bioreactor, which led to a single organism proliferating.
