= Deborah Zamble =

Canadian chemist (1971–2020)

Deborah Beth Zamble
- Born: October 5, 1971; Kingston, Ontario
- Died: July 6, 2020 (aged 48)
- Education: University of Toronto; Massachusetts Institute of Technology
- Scientific career
- Workplaces: Harvard Medical School; University of Toronto
- Thesis: The responses of cellular proteins to cisplatin-damaged DNA (1999)
- Website: Zamble Lab

Deborah Beth Zamble (October 5, 1971 – July 6, 2020) was a Canadian chemist and Canada Research Chair in Biological Chemistry at the University of Toronto. Her research considered how bacteria processed metal nutrients.

== Early life and education ==
Zamble was born in Kingston, Ontario. She attended the University of Toronto for her undergraduate studies, where she worked in the lab of the Bibudhendra Sarkar. Zamble was a graduate student at the Massachusetts Institute of Technology, where she worked with Stephen J. Lippard on cisplatin, an anti-cancer drug. Her research considered the role of p53 in the cellular response to the drug. Zamble was a postdoctoral fellow at the Harvard Medical School, where she worked alongside Christopher T. Walsh. At the Harvard Medical School, Zamble worked on the microcin B17 synthetase.

== Research and career ==
Zamble returned to Canada in 2001, where she was made a Canada Research Chair in Biological Chemistry. Here she investigated how bacteria process metal nutrients, with a focus on the uptake of nickel. Transition metals are essential to the structure and function of biological systems, but can be toxic if they are allowed to accumulate. To mitigate this, cells make use of metalloproteins to regulate the use of each metal. In particular, Zamble studies the bacteria Escherichia coli and Helicobacter pylori.

== Academic service ==
Zamble served on the executive board of the Royal Canadian Institute. She served on the editorial boards of the Journal of Biological Chemistry and Metallomics. Zamble was involved with recreating the biological chemistry curriculum at the University of Toronto, leading a second year course that incorporated her enthusiasm for cooking.

== Awards and honours ==
- 1993 University of Toronto College Science Medal
- 2001 Canada Research Chair in Biological Chemistry
- 2002 Premier's Research and Excellence Awards
- 2007 Sloan Research Fellowship
- 2009 NSERC Discovery Accelerator Research Award
- 2012 Queen Elizabeth Diamond Jubilee Medal

== Selected publications ==
- Zamble, Deborah B.; Lippard, Stephen J. (1995). "Cisplatin and DNA repair in cancer chemotherapy". Trends in Biochemical Sciences. 20 (10): 435–439. doi:10.1016/S0968-0004(00)89095-7. PMID 8533159.
- Zamble, Deborah B.; Mu, David; Reardon, Joyce T.; Sancar, Aziz; Lippard, Stephen J. (1996-01-01). "Repair of Cisplatin−DNA Adducts by the Mammalian Excision Nuclease". Biochemistry. 35 (31): 10004–10013. doi:10.1021/bi960453+. ISSN 0006-2960. PMID 8756462.
- Huang, J. C.; Zamble, D. B.; Reardon, J. T.; Lippard, S. J.; Sancar, A. (1994-10-25). "HMG-domain proteins specifically inhibit the repair of the major DNA adduct of the anticancer drug cisplatin by human excision nuclease". Proceedings of the National Academy of Sciences. 91 (22): 10394–10398. Bibcode:1994PNAS...9110394H. doi:10.1073/pnas.91.22.10394. ISSN 0027-8424. PMC 45026. PMID 7937961.
- Zamble, Deborah; Rowińska-Żyrek, Magdalena; Kozłowski, Henryk, eds. (24 March 2017). The Biological Chemistry of Nickel. Cambridge, U.K.: Royal Society of Chemistry. ISBN 978-1-78801-058-0. OCLC 1007052796.

== Personal life ==
On July 6, 2020, Zamble died of an unexpected brain haemorrhage.
