= Stephen J. Lippard =

American chemist

Stephen Lippard
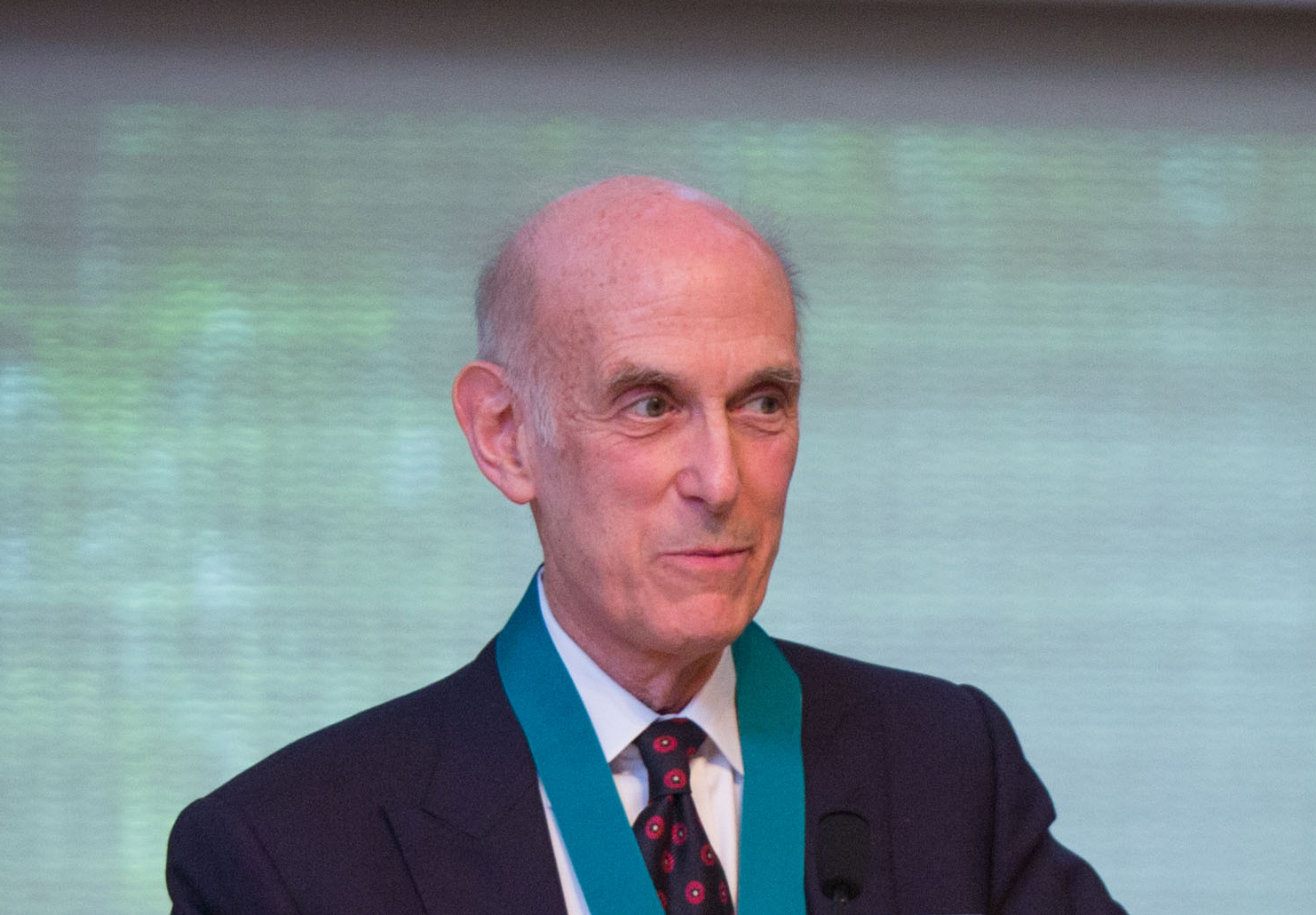
- Lippard in 2017
- Born: Stephen James Lippard; October 12, 1940 (age 85); Pittsburgh, Pennsylvania, U.S.
- Education: Haverford College (B.S.) (1962); Massachusetts Institute of Technology (Ph.D) (1965)
- Awards: William H. Nichols Medal (1995); National Medal of Science (2004); Linus Pauling Award (2009); Priestley Medal (2014); Welch Award in Chemistry (2016); American Institute of Chemists Gold Medal (2017)
- Scientific career
- Fields: Inorganic chemistry; bioinorganic chemistry; biological chemistry; neurochemistry
- Workplaces: Massachusetts Institute of Technology; Columbia University
- Doctoral advisor: F. Albert Cotton
- Doctoral students: Amy M. Barrios; Jacqueline Barton; Katherine Franz; Chuan He; Kenneth Karlin; Elizabeth Nolan; Amy Rosenzweig; Wesley Sundquist; Ann M. Valentine; Karen Wetterhahn; Jonathan Wilker; Deborah Zamble
- Other notable students: Christopher Chang (postdoc), John F. Hartwig (postdoc), Christine S. Chow (postdoc), Jack R. Norton (postdoc), JoAnne Stubbe (postdoc), William B. Tolman (postdoc)
- Website: lippardlab.mit.edu

External videos
- "Stephen J. Lippard, Ph.D., 2015 Benjamin Franklin Medal in Chemistry", Franklin Institute
- "Prof. Stephen J. Lippard receives highest honors, 2014 Priestley Medal", American Chemical Society

Stephen James Lippard (born October 12, 1940) is the Arthur Amos Noyes Emeritus Professor of Chemistry at the Massachusetts Institute of Technology. He is considered one of the founders of bioinorganic chemistry, studying the interactions of nonliving substances such as metals with biological systems. He is also considered a founder of metalloneurochemistry, the study of metal ions and their effects in the brain and nervous system. He has done pioneering work in understanding protein structure and synthesis, the enzymatic functions of methane monooxygenase (MMO), and the mechanisms of cisplatin anticancer drugs. His work has applications for the treatment of cancer, for bioremediation of the environment, and for the development of synthetic methanol-based fuels.

== Education ==
Lippard was born in Pittsburgh, Pennsylvania, where he graduated from Taylor Allderdice High School in 1958. He earned his bachelor's degree from Haverford College in 1962. Originally interested in attending medical school, a talk on medicinal chemistry by visiting chemist Francis P.J. Dwyer inspired Lippard to focus on inorganic chemistry for his Ph.D. Lippard worked with F. Albert Cotton at MIT on rhenium oxo complexes and clusters. He completed the thesis Chemistry of the bromorhenates, receiving his Ph.D. from MIT in 1965.

== Career ==
Lippard joined the faculty of Columbia University in 1966 as an assistant professor. He was promoted to associate professor with tenure in 1969 and full Professor in 1972.

In 1983, Lippard returned to MIT as a professor of chemistry. He has held the Arthur Amos Noyes Professorship of Chemistry at MIT since 1989. He and his wife Judy were housemasters at MIT's MacGregor House from 1991 to 1995. Lippard served as the head of the MIT chemistry department from 1995 to 2005. He is recognized for his scientific work and for his work with students, having mentored more than 100 PhDs. His students are active in a wide range of areas, in part because "He delivers a strong message that you need to go to the frontier of science and pick interesting problems." Forty percent of his graduate students have been women, who he gives "high-risk, high-reward projects".

Lippard has co-authored over 900 scholarly and professional articles, and co-authored the textbook Principles of Bioinorganic Chemistry (1994) with Jeremy Berg. He edited the book series Progress in Inorganic Chemistry from Volume 11 to 40. He was an Associate Editor of the journal Inorganic Chemistry from 1983 to 1989, and an Associate Editor of the Journal of the American Chemical Society from 1989 to 2013, as well as serving on the editorial boards of numerous other journals.

== Research ==
Lippard's research activities are at the interface of biology and inorganic chemistry. Lippard focuses on understanding the physical and structural properties of metal complexes, their synthesis and reactions, and the involvement of metal ions in biological systems. The formation and breaking of molecular bonds underlie many biochemical transformations. Purely inorganic substances such as iron are often required in essential organic reactions, e.g. oxygen binding in the hemoglobin family. Lippard attempts to better understand the role of metal complexes in the physiology and pathology of existing biological systems, and to identify possible applications of metal ions in medical treatment.

He has made major contributions in a number of areas, including the development of platinum-based anticancer drugs such as the cisplatin family. Another area of interest is the structure and function of methane and enzymes that consume greenhouse gas hydrocarbons. In metalloneurochemistry, he studies the molecular activity of metal ions in the brain and develops optical and MRI sensors for binding, tracking, and measuring metal ions as they interact with neurotransmitters and other biological signaling agents.

=== Cisplatin ===
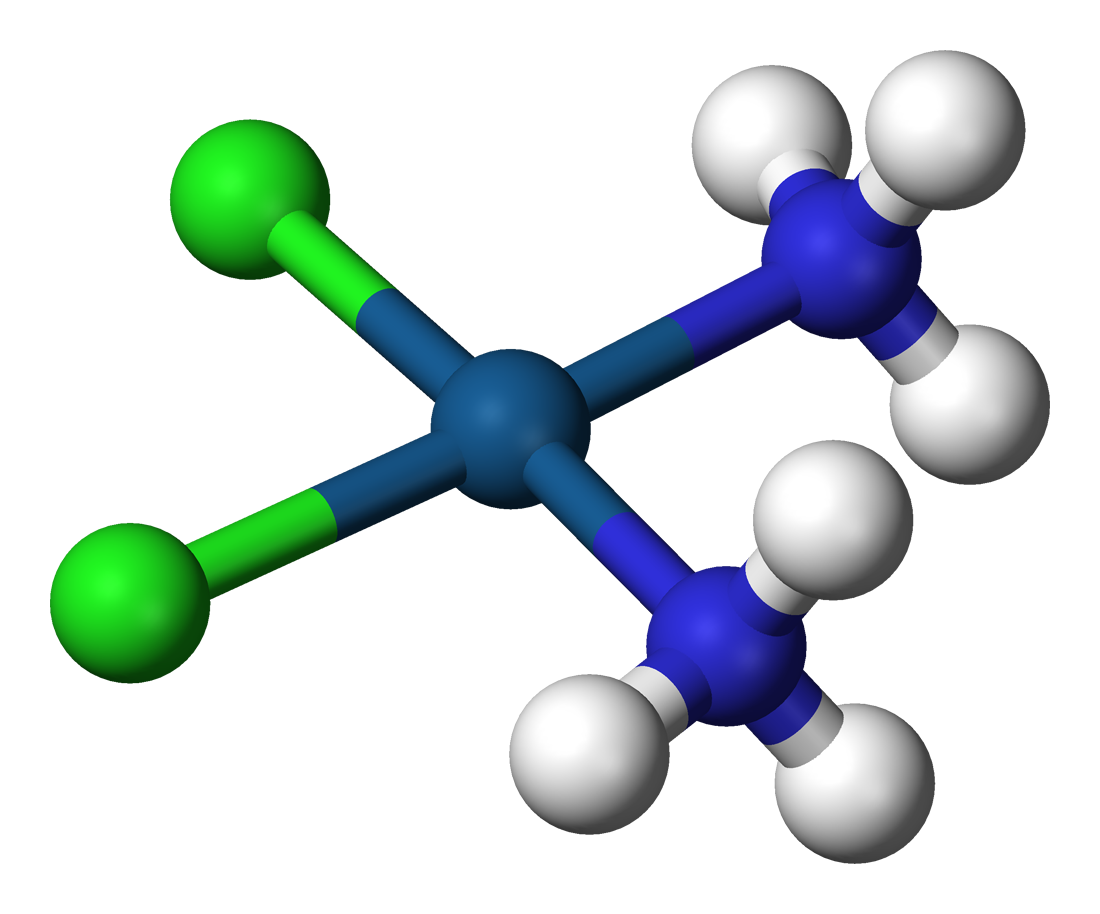
Cisplatin

Cisplatin is one of the most frequently used chemotherapy medications for many forms of cancer. It was discovered in the 1960s by Barnett Rosenberg, but its mechanism of action was not understood.

Early work in Lippard's lab on the interaction of metal complexes with nucleic acids led to the discovery of the first metallo-intercalators and eventually to the understanding of the mechanisms of cisplatin. Lippard and his students examined sequences of DNA and RNA and incorporated sulfur atoms into the sugar-phosphate backbone, where they selectively bound mercury or platinum complexes to specific positions. Karen Jennette's discovery that sterically encumbered platinum complexes were more successful in binding to sulfur atoms in tRNA than mercury salts led researchers to propose that the platinum complexes intercalated between the double-stranded RNA's base pairs. It was the first experimental demonstration to show a metal complex binding to DNA by intercalation: platinum terpyridine complexes inserted between the DNA base pairs and unwound the double helix. Using fiber X-ray diffraction, Peter Bond and others were able to display the intercalated platinum complex and to confirm predictions that the spacing of intercalators in DNA base pairs would follow the neighbor exclusion rule.

This established the groundwork for subsequent work on intercalative binding. Jacqueline Barton and others have used electron micrography to show that the covalent binding of platinum complexes changes the supercoiling of the DNA, "bending and unwinding" the double helix. Further experiments have explored the mechanisms through which platinum drugs bind their biological targets and led to insights into their anticancer activity. Important results include the identification of an intrastrand d(pGpG) cross-link as the major adduct on platinated single-stranded DNA, identification of the major adduct on double-stranded DNA, the binding of high-mobility-group proteins to platinated DNA cross-links. Using X-ray crystallography and other techniques, Lippard and his coworkers have examined the mechanisms involved in binding cisplatin to DNA fragments, to better understand how cisplatin invades tumor cells and interferes with their activity. The interaction of Cisplatin and DNA results in the formation of DNA-DNA interstrand and intrastrand crosslinks which block DNA replication and transcription mechanisms. As well as the intrastrand cross links created by cisplatin, monofunctional metal complexes may suggest possible cancer treatments.

A related line of research in Lippard's laboratory involves platinum blues. Jacqueline Barton was the first person to synthesize and structurally characterize a crystalline platinum blue, pyridone blue. Since then, extensive research has been done on the structure, properties, and reactions of such complexes.

=== Methane monooxygenases ===
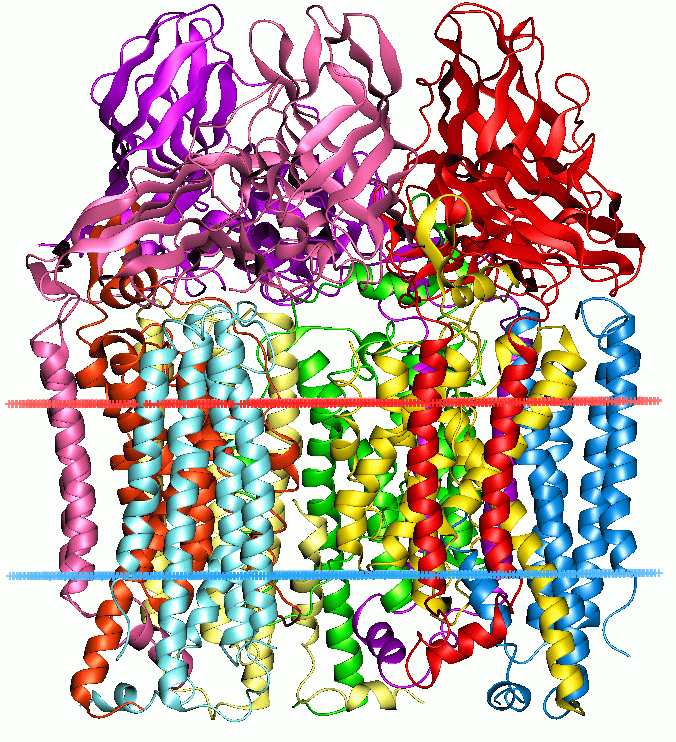
Particulate methane monooxygenase

Members of the Lippard laboratory studying macromolecular crystallography have explored the structure, mechanisms and activity of bacterial multicomponent monooxygenases. Methane monooxygenases are enzymes that occur in bacteria called methanotrophs. The primary function of this enzyme is the hydroxylation of methane to methanol as the first step in methane metabolism.

Amy Rosenzweig determined the protein x-ray structure of the soluble form of methane monooxygenase (MMO) as Lippard's graduate student. Lippard has used X-ray diffraction and a variety of other methods to study such compounds, greatly expanding our understanding of their structure and function. MMO is vital to Earth's carbon cycle, and knowledge of its structure may help to develop clean technologies for methanol-based fuels. Methane monoxygenases may also be useful for bioremediation.

=== Iron complexes ===
Lippard and his students have also studied the synthesis of diiron complexes such as diiron hydroxylase to better understand the activities of metal atoms in biological molecules. They have developed model compounds for carboxylate-bridged diiron metalloenzymes which can be compared with corresponding biological forms. They have synthesized analogues of the diiron carboxylate cores of MMO and related carboxylate-bridged diiron proteins such as the dioxygen transporter hemerythrin. In 2010, Lippard received the Ronald Breslow Award for his work on nonheme iron proteins.

Also exciting was the synthesis of a "molecular ferric wheel" by Kingsley Taft, the first wheel structure to be observed in self-assembled polymetallic chemistry. A nearly perfect circle containing ten ferric ions, the structure spontaneously assembled in methanolic solutions of diiron(III) oxo complexes, which were being studied to better understand polyiron oxo protein cores like those of hemerythrin. Although no particular use is known for the ferric wheel, it and subsequent ring-shaped homometallic molecular clusters are of interest as a subclass of molecular magnets. Another novel complex was a "ferric triple-decker", containing three parallel triangular iron units and a triple bridge of six citrate ligands.

=== Metalloneurochemistry ===
Lippard is considered a founder of metalloneurochemistry, the study of metal ions at the molecular level as they affect the brain and the nervous system. Working at the interface of inorganic chemistry and neuroscience, he has devised fluorescent imaging agents for studying mobile zinc and nitric oxide and their effects on neurotransmission and other forms of biological signaling.

== Companies ==
In 2011 Lippard founded Blend Therapeutics with Omid Cameron Farokhzad and Robert Langer, in Watertown, Massachusetts. Blend focused on developing anti-cancer medicines for treatment of solid tumor cancers, with the goal of targeting cancerous tissue and leaving healthy cells alone. Its proprietary drug candidates included BTP-114, a cisplatin prodrug, and BTP-277, a targeting ligand designed to bond selectively to tumor cells. As of 2016, Blend split off into two separate companies: Tarveda and Placon, to follow these two approaches.

Placon Therapeutics is developing platinum-based cancer therapies. These include BTP-114, the first clinical candidate to use an albumin-conjugating, platinum-prodrug platform, based on Lippard's work. BTP-114 has been cleared for Phase 1 cancer-treatment clinical trials by the Food and Drug Administration (FDA).

Tarveda Therapeutics is developing BTP-277 (renamed PEN-221) and other Pentarins, a proprietary class of therapeutics which use peptide ligands to carry a target drug to tumor cells. Pentarins are nanoparticle drugs, similar to antibody-drug conjugates but smaller, that have been described as "mini-smart bombs". They are believed to be capable of penetrating dense tumor-based cancers.

== Honors and awards ==
Lippard has been elected to the National Academy of Sciences, the National Institute of Medicine, the American Academy of Arts and Sciences, and the American Philosophical Society. He is an honorary member of the Royal Irish Academy (2002), the Italian Chemical Society (1996), and the German National Academy of Sciences (Leopoldina) (2004), and is an external scientific member of the Max-Planck Institute (1996) in Germany.

He has received honorary Doctorate of Science degrees from Haverford College, Texas A&M University, and the University of South Carolina, and an honorary Doctorate degree from Hebrew University of Jerusalem.

Lippard has received many awards throughout his career, most notably the 2004 National Medal of Science, the 2014 Priestley Medal of the American Chemical Society, its highest award, and the 2014 James R. Killian lectureship at MIT, given to one faculty member of the Institute per year. He is also the recipient of the Linus Pauling Medal, Theodore W. Richards Medal, and the William H. Nichols Medal. For his work in bioinorganic and biomimetic chemistry, Lippard received the Ronald Breslow Award and the Alfred Bader Award from the American Chemical Society (ACS). For research in inorganic and organometallic chemistry, as well as his role as an educator, he was honored with ACS awards for Inorganic Chemistry and for Distinguished Service in Inorganic Chemistry. In 2015, Lippard won the Benjamin Franklin Medal in Chemistry bestowed by The Franklin Institute. In 2016, he received the F. A. Cotton Medal for excellence in chemical research and the Welch Award in Chemistry from the Robert A. Welch Foundation. In 2017, he was chosen to receive the American Institute of Chemists Gold Medal.

== Personal life ==
Stephen Lippard married Judith Ann Drezner in 1964. They have two sons, Josh and Alex, a daughter-in-law Sandra, and twin granddaughters, Lucy and Annie. Judy Lippard died on September 9, 2013. Stephen moved to Washington, DC, in 2017, where he remains active in science, writing, consulting, and grandfathering, while expanding his harpsichord playing and cooking skills.
