= Methylohalobius =

Scientific classification
- Domain: Bacteria
- Kingdom: Pseudomonadati
- Phylum: Pseudomonadota
- Class: Gammaproteobacteria
- Order: Methylococcales
- Family: Methylothermaceae
- Genus: Methylohalobius; Heyer et al. 2005
- Species: M. crimeensis

Binomial name
- Methylohalobius crimeensis Heyer et al. 2005

Synonyms
- Methylohalobium

Genus of bacteria

Methylohalobius is a bacterial genus from the family Methylothermaceae. The only species in the genus is Methylohalobius crimeensis.

Methylohalobius crimeensis is a moderately halophilic, methanotrophic bacterium, the type species of its genus. It is Gram-negative, aerobic, non-pigmented, motile, coccoid to spindle-shaped, with type strain 10Ki^{T} (=DSM 16011^{T} =ATCC BAA-967^{T}).
