= Methanobactin =

Group of stereoisomers

Methanobactin (mb) is a class of copper-binding and reducing chromophoric peptides initially identified in the methanotroph Methylococcus capsulatus Bath - and later in Methylosinus trichosporium OB3b - during the isolation of the membrane-associated or particulate methane monooxygenase (pMMO). It is thought to be secreted to the extracellular media to recruit copper, a critical component of methane monooxygenase, the first enzyme in the series that catalyzes the oxidation of methane into methanol. Methanobactin functions as a chalkophore, similar to iron siderophores, by binding to Cu(II) or Cu(I) then shuttling the copper into the cell. Methanobactin has an extremely high affinity for binding and Cu(I) with a K_{d} of approximately 10^{20} M^{−1} at pH 8. Additionally, methanobactin can reduce Cu(II), which is toxic to cells, to Cu(I), the form used in pMMO. Moreover, different species of methanobactin are hypothesized to be ubiquitous within the biosphere, especially in light of the discovery of molecules produced by other type II methanotrophs that similarly bind and reduce copper (II) to copper (I).

== Strains of Methanobactin ==
=== OB3b ===
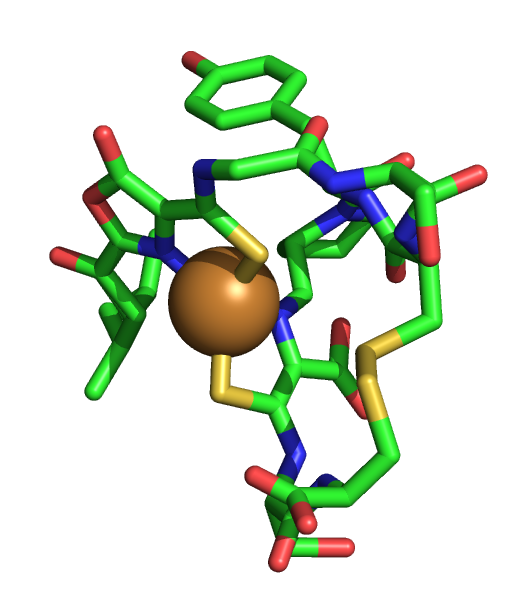
Methanobactin OB3b. PDB 2xji

Methanobactin OB3b is a commonly studied methanobactin. It has a molecular weight of 1154Da when metal free. OB3b is composed of 9 amino acid residues with two oxazolone rings, which take part in binding to copper ions. The oxazalone rings are susceptible to cleavage under low pH conditions, which releases any metal ion bound to the rings. Copper is bound and reduced at a tetradentate binding site composed of 2 oxazolone rings and 2 modified enethiol groups. In particular, the origin and function of these oxazolone rings in methanobactin OB3b has been the subject of research, since these domains appear unique.

In 2010, it was suggested that mb OB3b is derived from a small, ribsomally-produced peptide precursor with the sequence of L-C-G-S-C-Y-P-C-S-C-M. Functional mbOB3b is composed of (isobutyl group)-(Oxazolone ring A)-G-S-C-Y-(Oxazolone ring B)-S-M. (Note that some specimens of mBOB3b are found without the C-terminal methionine and appear fully functional.) It has been argued that the chromophoric rings of this particular species of methanobactin enable mbOB3b to bind and reduce other metals. For example, mbOB3b can reduce Ag(I) to Ag(0), Au(III) to Au(0), Cr(VI) to Cr(III), and Hg(II) to Hg(I); it is also able to bind Co(II), Zn (II), Mn(II), Pb(II), and U(IV). Because of this, it is possible that methanobactin may have several medical and environmental applications as a metal chelator and reducing agent.

The mechanism of metal reduction is currently undetermined. It has been shown that the tetradentate binding configuration of copper(I) in mbOB3b necessitates the ligation of a water molecule to the copper ion as a ligand. This has been used to argue that water is the source of electrons for reducing the bound metal ion. Others have suggested that the disulfide bridge in methanobactin's structure is the source of the electron, though XPS has shown that this bond is still intact in copper-bound methanobactin. The source of this reducing electron remains elusive at the moment.

=== SB2 ===
Methanobactin SB2 is produced by Methylocystis bacteria. SB2 is much smaller than OB3b with a molecular weight of 851Da when metal free. SB2 contains one imidazole ring and one oxazalone ring as well as a sulfate group that are thought to partake in binding copper.
