= Methylomirabilaceae =

Scientific classification (Candidatus)
- Domain: Bacteria
- Kingdom: incertae sedis
- Phylum: Methylomirabilota
- Class: Methylomirabilia
- Order: Methylomirabilales
- Family: Methylomirabilaceae; Chuvochina et al. 2023

Genus
- "Ca. Methylomirabilis"

Family of bacteria

Methylomirabilaceae is a family of bacteria, represented by type genus Ca. Methylomirabilis. Represented most famously by the novel methane-oxidizing bacterium Ca. Methylomirabilis oxyfera, which appears to split oxygen from nitrates, it contains several other genera not yet described.

SILVA 138.1 lists 6 uncultured genera currently within the family:

- Candidatus Methylomirabilis
- MIZ14
- MIZ17
- SH765B-TzT-35
- wb1-A12
- Z114MB74

These genera are consistently described in methane-rich environments, but only species within Candidatus Methylomirabilis are confidently described as methane-oxidizers.

== Phylogeny ==
The currently accepted taxonomy is based on the List of Prokaryotic names with Standing in Nomenclature (LPSN) and National Center for Biotechnology Information (NCBI).

120 marker proteins based GTDB 10-RS226

- "Ca. Methylomirabilis"
  - - "Ca. M. limnetica" Graf et al. 2018
    - "Ca. M. tolerans" Dalcin Martins et al. 2022
  - - "Ca. M. lanthanidiphila" Versantvoort et al. 2018
    - "Ca. M. oxygeniifera" Ettwig et al. 2010 corrig. Oren 2017

Unassigned species of "Ca. Methylomirabilis":

- "Ca. M. iodofontis" Zhu et al. 2022
- "Ca. M. nitratireducens" Li et al. 2023
- "Ca. M. sinica" He et al. 2016

== See also ==
- List of bacterial orders
- List of bacteria genera
