= Danica Galonić Fujimori =

Serbian-American chemical biologist

- Born: Serbia
- Education: University of Illinois Urbana-Champaign; University of Belgrade
- Scientific career
- Workplaces: University of California, San Francisco; Harvard Medical School
- Thesis: Convergent Site-Selective Carbohydrate-Peptide Ligations With Dehydroalanine and Aziridine -2 -Carboxylic Acid-Containing Peptides (2005)
- Website: Fujimori Lab

Danica Galonić Fujimori (Serbian: Даница Галонић Фуџимори) is a Serbian-American chemical biologist who is a professor at the University of California, San Francisco. Her research considers nucleic acid synthesis and tissue engineering. In the search for new therapeutics and vaccines, she has studied the interactions between ribosomes and SARS-CoV-2.

== Early life and education ==
Galonić Fujimori earned her undergraduate degree at the University of Belgrade. She moved to the University of Illinois Urbana-Champaign for her doctoral research, where she earned a PhD in biochemistry. Her research considered the development of two strategies for site-selective peptide modification. She then moved to the Harvard Medical School where she worked alongside Christopher T. Walsh.

== Research and career ==
Galonić Fujimori has studied various biological processes, including chromatin formation, transcriptional regulation and DNA repair. Methylation impacts the regulation of biological processes, and the deregulation of methylation is associated with various diseases. As such, understanding and exploiting enzymatic regulation of methylation could provide an opportunity for therapeutic intervention. She has studied Jumonji domain-containing histone-lysine demethylases, complex proteins which catalyze the removal of methylation marks on the lysine residues of multiple histones can contain chromatin reader domains. These reader domains interact with chromatin, an interaction which is modulated by chromatin modifications. To probe the cellular function of the Jumonji family, the Galonić Fujimori laboratory develop small molecule inhibitors. She proposes that these molecules can be used to inhibit the aberrant demethylation that occurs in certain diseases. She has investigated the methylation of RNA, and how this impacts the cellular function of RNA.

Fujimori investigates how bacteria acquire immune responses to antibiotics. She has focused her efforts on antibiotics that target the ribosome of bacteria, which is involved with protein synthesis. Antibiotics such as linezolid bind to sites such as the peptidyl transferase center, blocking protein biosynthesis.

During the COVID-19 pandemic, Galonić Fujimori started working on virus-host interactions in response to SARS-CoV-2. She showed that bromodomain and extraterminal (BET) proteins were involved in the body's response to COVID-19 infection. She started working on pharmaceuticals to tackle future pandemics.

== Awards and honors ==
- 2011 National Science Foundation CAREER Award
- 2015 University of California, San Francisco Haile T. Debas Academy of Medical Educators Excellence in Teaching Award
- 2015 University of California, Berkeley Sackler Sabbatical Exchange Program
- 2017 University of California, San Francisco Byers Award Lecture in Basic Sciences
- 2020 Keck Foundation WM Keck Medical Research Award
- 2020 Bowes Biomedical Investigator Award

2010 V Foundation Scholar Award, V Foundation https://cancer.ucsf.edu/people/galonic-fujimori.danica 2010 Hellman Family Early-Career Faculty Award, Hellman Family Foundation https://cancer.ucsf.edu/people/galonic-fujimori.danica 2009 Kimmel Scholar Award, Sidney Kimmel Foundation for Cancer Research https://cancer.ucsf.edu/people/galonic-fujimori.danica 2007 NIH Pathway to Independence Award, National Institutes of Health https://cancer.ucsf.edu/people/galonic-fujimori.danica 2005 Postdoctoral Fellowship, Damon Runyon Cancer Research Foundation https://cancer.ucsf.edu/people/galonic-fujimori.danica
