= Amy M. Barrios =

American chemist

- Born: Salt Lake City, Utah, US
- Education: University of Utah (B.S. 1995); Massachusetts Institute of Technology (Ph.D. 2000); University of California, San Francisco (NIH Postdoctoral Fellow 2000–2003)
- Occupations: Associate Dean for Postdoctoral Affairs, University of Utah
- Website: https://pharmacy.utah.edu/medchem/faculty/barrios-lab/

Amy M. Barrios is an American medicinal chemist working as a professor of Medicinal Chemistry and the Associate Dean for Postdoctoral Affairs for the University of Utah. Barrios' research lab focuses on developing probes to study protein tyrosine phosphatase (PTP) activity and regulation.

== Education ==
Amy Barrios graduated with her bachelor's degree in chemistry from the University of Utah in 1995, where she worked as an undergraduate researcher in the Department of Radiobiology under Scott C. Miller. Barrios received the Hypercube Scholar Award from the University of Utah in 1995. She then attended graduate school at the Massachusetts Institute of Technology and received her Ph.D. in Inorganic Chemistry. In graduate school, she worked with Stephen J. Lippard as her research advisor. She was awarded an NIH Predoctoral Fellowship at MIT, still working with Lippard, and then was awarded an NIH Postdoctoral Fellowship at the University of California, San Francisco working with Charles S. Craik.

== Career and research ==
Barrios started her career as an undergraduate researcher in the Department of Radiobiology under Professor Scott C. Miller at the University of Utah. In this lab, she researched radiation poisoning toward the development of an oral medication that could bind to radioactive molecules to take out of the body. She continued her research career during her Ph.D. under Professor Stephen J. Lippard, in the Department of Chemistry at MIT. At MIT, she worked on the metalloenzyme urease and created a compound to understand how the di-nickel center in urease hydrolyzes urea since the mechanism of action had not yet been discovered. While the synthetic compound allowed Barrios to determine the mechanism of action, this mechanism turned out to be similar to, but not the same, as the mechanism that urease uses. She worked on additional metalloenzymes that used iron and nickel during her graduate work.

During her postdoctoral fellowship at the University of California under Professor Charles S. Craik, she developed a method to assay the substrate specificity of proteolytic enzymes using lanthanide ion fluorescence. This method was used to develop peptide libraries to determine substrate specificity for proteolytic enzymes.

While at the University of Southern California as a Gabilan Assistant Professor of Chemistry, Barrios worked on a tool that allows the visualization of tyrosine phosphatase activity in cells in real-time using protein tyrosine phosphatases (PTPs). This activity was used to determine and isolate cell-permeable inhibitors of PTPs that could be used as potential drugs later on, for example, working on CD45 and Bacillus anthracis. Related to this work on PTPs, in 2006, Barrios and Sayantan Mitra filed a patent for "Coumarin-based amino acids for used in enzyme activity and substrate specificity assay" which can be incorporated into peptides to visualize the hydrolyzation of PTPs. Additionally, in 2009, Barrios, Mitra, Stephanie Stanford, and Nunzio Bottini filed a patent for a "Method for monitoring intracellular tyrosine phosphatase activity". This invention was based on the CD45 probe used in the previously mentioned tyrosine phosphatases and is used to monitor "intracellular tyrosine dephosphorylation at the single-cell level" and the potential development of novel therapeutics.

As assistant professor of Medicinal Chemistry at the University of Utah in 2012, Barrios worked on a drug to target a parasite known as Entamoeba histolytica. This parasite causes amebiasis which was the fourth leading cause of death world-wide caused by protozoan infections. Metronidazole, the drug that was being used at the time, had adverse side effects and some resistance to the medication was on the rise. Barrios contributed to the development of a new anti-parasitic drug. Through a high-throughput drug screen, they found that auranofin, which is commonly used for rheumatoid arthritis, targets TrxR which decreases the parasite's ability to withstand oxidative stress. This research provided a new drug that could serve as a new treatment for amebiasis caused by the Entamoeba histolytica. In 2017, auranofin completed phase I clinical trials against Entamoeba histolytica and Giardia

The Barrios Lab in the Department of Pharmacy at the University of Utah largely focuses on developing chemical probes to study biological substrates, substrate selectivity, cellular regulation, and druggability for use in therapeutics. Human protein tyrosine phosphatases (PTPs) hold substantial relevance in human autoimmunity and T-cell receptor signaling, as well as cell signaling in diseases. Novel chemical probes to better understand the activity and regulation of this family of enzymes aids in developing human therapeutics. These developments in the Barrios Lab include fluorogenic probes to investigate PTP activity, along with profiling substrate selectivity for the use of developing potent, selective inhibitors. Additionally, the Barrios Lab also focuses on chemical tools used to study the therapeutic roles of metal ions as biological targets of gold-based compounds.

== Awards and honors ==
- Distinguished Mentor Award (University of Utah) 2019
- University of Utah MUSE Professor 2019-ongoing
- Presidential Scholar Award (University of Utah) 2016–2019
- Teva Pharmaceutical Scholar Award 2015–2018
- Young Investigator Award, Metals in Medicine Gordon Conference 2012
- Fellow of the American Association for the Advancement of Science 2023

== Bibliography ==
- Lui, G.; Bruenger, F.W.; Barrios, A. M.; Miller, S.C. (1995). "Synthesis of 2-Alkyl-3-Hydroxy-4-Pyridinone-Ribonucleosides, Potential Oral Iron Chelators". Nucleosides and Nucleotides. 14: 1901–1904.
- Barrios, A.M. and Lippard, S.J. (2000). "Interaction of Urea with a Hydroxide-Bridged Dinuclear Nickel Center: An Alternative Model for the Mechanism of Urease". J. Am. Chem. Soc.. 122(38): 9172–9177.
- Barrios, A.M. and Craik, C.S. (2002). "Scanning the Prime-Site Substrate Specificity of Proteolytic Enzymes: A Novel Assay Based on Ligand-Enhanced Lanthanide Ion Fluorescence". Bioorg. Med. Chem. Lett.. 12: 3619–3623.
- Stanford, S.M.; Panchal, R.G.; Walker, L.M.; Falk, M.D.; Mitra, S.; Damle, S.S.; Ruble, D.; Kaltcheva, T.; Zhang, S.; Zhang, Z.-Y.; Bavari, S.; Barrios, A.M.; Bottini, N. (2012). "High-Throughput Screen Using a Single-Cell Tyrosine Phosphatase Assay Reveals Biologically Active CD45 Inhibitors". Proc. Natl. Acad. Sci.. 109(35): 13972–13977.
- Barrios, A. and Mitra, S. (July 2, 2015). "Coumarin-based amino acids for use in enzyme activity and substrate specificity assays". United States Patent and Trademark Office.
- Bottini, N.; Stanford. S.; Barrios, A.; Mitra, S. (March 19, 2013). "Method for monitoring intracellular tyrosine phosphatase activity". United States Patent and Trademark Office.
- Debnath, A.; Parsonage, D.; Andrade, R.; He, C.; Cobo, E.; Hirata, K.; Chen, S.; Garcia-Rivera, G.; Orozco, E.; Martinez, M.; Gunatilleke, S.; Barrios, A.M.; Arkin, M.; Poole, L.; McKerrow, J.; Reed, S. (2012). "A High-Throughput Drug Screen for Entamoeba histolytica identifies a new lead and target". Nat. Med.. 18(6): 956–960.
