= Robert Abeles =

American biochemist

Robert Heinz Abeles
- Abeles in 1995
- Born: January 14, 1926; Vienna, Austria
- Died: June 18, 2000 (aged 74)
- Education: University of Chicago; University of Michigan
- Known for: Mechanisms of enzyme-catalyzed reactions
- Scientific career
- Fields: Biological chemistry
- Institutions: Ohio State University; University of Colorado Boulder; Brandeis University; Harvard University
- Academic advisors: Frank Westheimer
- Doctoral students: Christopher Walsh

Robert Heinz Abeles (January 14, 1926 – June 18, 2000) was an American biochemist, dedicated in particular to enzymology and chemical biology. He was born in Vienna, but his family moved to Chicago in 1939, and he made most of his career at Brandeis University. In his later years, Abeles had serious health problems, including Hodgkin's disease in the 1970s and Parkinson's disease in the last ten years.

== Education ==
After undergraduate studies at the University of Chicago, and doctoral work at the University of Colorado, Abeles carried out post-doctoral research under the supervision of Frank Westheimer in the chemistry department at Harvard University. This research formed the starting point for his life's work on the mechanisms of the chemical reactions of living systems.

== Ohio State, Michigan and Brandeis ==
After faculty appointments at Ohio State University and the University of Michigan, moved in 1964 to the recently inaugurated department of biochemistry at Brandeis, and remained there for 36 years, until he died in 2000. He and William Jencks together turned Brandeis into a leading center in the world for chemical biochemistry.

== Research ==
Abeles, together with Jencks and Westheimer, fostered a strong belief that chemical mechanisms could explain all aspects of metabolism.

With Alan Maycock, Abeles carried out important work on suicide enzyme inactivators, using their expertise to design inactivators of γ-cystathionase, and other enzymes.

== Awards ==
Abeles was elected to the National Academy of Sciences in 1999, and inducted into the Medicinal Chemistry Hall of Fame of the American Chemical Society. He received the Welch Award in Chemistry in 1995.
