= Elizabeth Nolan =

American biochemist

- Born: Elizabeth Marie Nolan; 1978 (age 47–48)
- Education: Smith College; Massachusetts Institute of Technology
- Awards: PECASE
- Scientific career
- Workplaces: Massachusetts Institute of Technology; Harvard Medical School
- Thesis: Fluorescent chemosensors for exploring zinc metalloneurochemistry and detecting mercury in aqueous solution (2006)
- Doctoral advisor: Stephen J. Lippard
- Website: chemistry.mit.edu/profile/elizabeth-marie-nolan

Elizabeth Marie Nolan (born 1978) is an American biochemist and Ivan R. Cottrell Professor of Immunology in the Department of Chemistry at Massachusetts Institute of Technology.

== Early life and education ==
Nolan was born in Niskayuna, New York. She studied at Smith College, where she majored in chemistry and graduated magna cum laude in 2000. During her undergraduate studies she minored in music and worked with Robert Linck on computational chemistry. She studied the stereoelectronic effects in substituted alkanes. Nolan was a member of Phi Beta Kappa. She was awarded a Fulbright Program Scholarship and moved to France to study siderophore-iron complexes. Nolan moved to Massachusetts Institute of Technology for her graduate studies, where she was supervised by Stephen J. Lippard. She developed small molecule fluorescent sensors to monitor for zinc in neurobiology and mercury in aqueous solutions. Together they filed a patent for Fluorescein-based metal sensors. Nolan was a postdoctoral scientist at the Harvard Medical School, working with Christopher T. Walsh on the biosynthetic assembly of microcin E492m. Microcin E492m is an antibiotic peptide that can target Gram-negative bacteria which express siderophore transporters. She was awarded a $2.5 million National Institutes of Health grant in 2010 to study antibacterial peptides and zinc in innate immunity. In 2011 she contributed to the book Letters to a Young Chemist.

== Research and career ==
Nolan was appointed as an assistant professor at the department of chemistry at the Massachusetts Institute of Technology in 2014. She explores the coordination chemistry of metal ions in biological systems; in particular how proteins destroy microbes by denying them metal nutrients. She looks at the peptides and metalloproteins that are involved in mammalian immune response. Her current focus is on calprotectins and how they bind metals. She used magnetic circular dichroism to study the binding of iron to human calprotectin. Her group look to understand how Neuronal cells process and removes SOD1 point mutants.

Nolan looks to design drugs to fight bacterial infections. They study how immunity peptides that are encoded by the gene clusters that biosynthesize antibiotics which use metal ion transporters protect the organisms that produce them. She proposes that hijacking the siderophore uptake pathways could allow new prevention and treatment against diseases. She worked with Manuela Raffatellu at University of California, Irvine to develop a new immunisation strategy against salmonella. They target siderophores, a molecule that salmonella secretes to scavenge iron. Immunisation against siderophores led to the production of antibodies that reduced the growth of salmonella and other bacteria. She is on the editorial board of Cell Chemical Biology.

=== Patents ===
- 2009 Fluorescein-based metal sensors
- 2015 Enterobactin conjugates and uses thereof
- 2016 Siderophore-based immunization against gram-negative bacteria

=== Awards and honours ===
- 2010 National Institutes of Health New Innovator Award
- 2011 Searle Scholar
- 2014 National Science Foundation CAREER Award
- 2014 Camille Dreyfus Teacher-Scholar
- 2016 Eli Lilly Award in Biological Chemistry
- 2016 Massachusetts Institute of Technology School of Science Teaching Prize
- 2017 Loyola University Chicago Denkewalter Lecture
- 2017 Presidential Early Career Award for Scientists and Engineers
