= Diana Chapman Walsh =

President of Wellesley College

12th President of Wellesley College
- In office 1993–2007
- Preceded by: Nannerl O. Keohane
- Succeeded by: H. Kim Bottomly

Academic background
- Education: Wellesley College (BA); Boston University (MS, PhD)
- Thesis: Medicine as management: the corporate medical director's complex and changing role (1983)

Academic work
- Discipline: Public health
- Institutions: Boston University; Harvard University; Wellesley College

Diana Chapman Walsh was President of Wellesley College from 1993 to 2007. During her tenure, the college revised its curriculum and expanded its programs in global education, internships and service learning, and interdisciplinary teaching and learning. The faculty established new majors in environmental studies, quantitative reasoning, cinema and media studies, neurosciences, and astrophysics. Japanese, Arabic and Korean languages were added to the curriculum as well, and a new department of East Asian Languages and Literatures was launched.

== Contributions ==
Other innovations included the opening of the Davis Museum and Cultural Center, the establishment of the Religious and Spiritual Life Program, the creation of the Knapp Media and Technology Center, the Knapp Social Science Center, a center for the humanities, the Ruhlman and Tanner conferences, which are annual day-long events to showcase student learning in the classroom and beyond, and other initiatives designed to strengthen the quality of campus intellectual life. Many of the college's administrative structures were strengthened and major landscape restoration and building projects were completed across the campus. The college raised over $700 million in new gifts during this 14-year period, strengthened the management of the endowment and increased it fourfold, to over $1.6 billion. Additionally, applications to Wellesley increased by 42%.

== Legacy at Wellesley ==
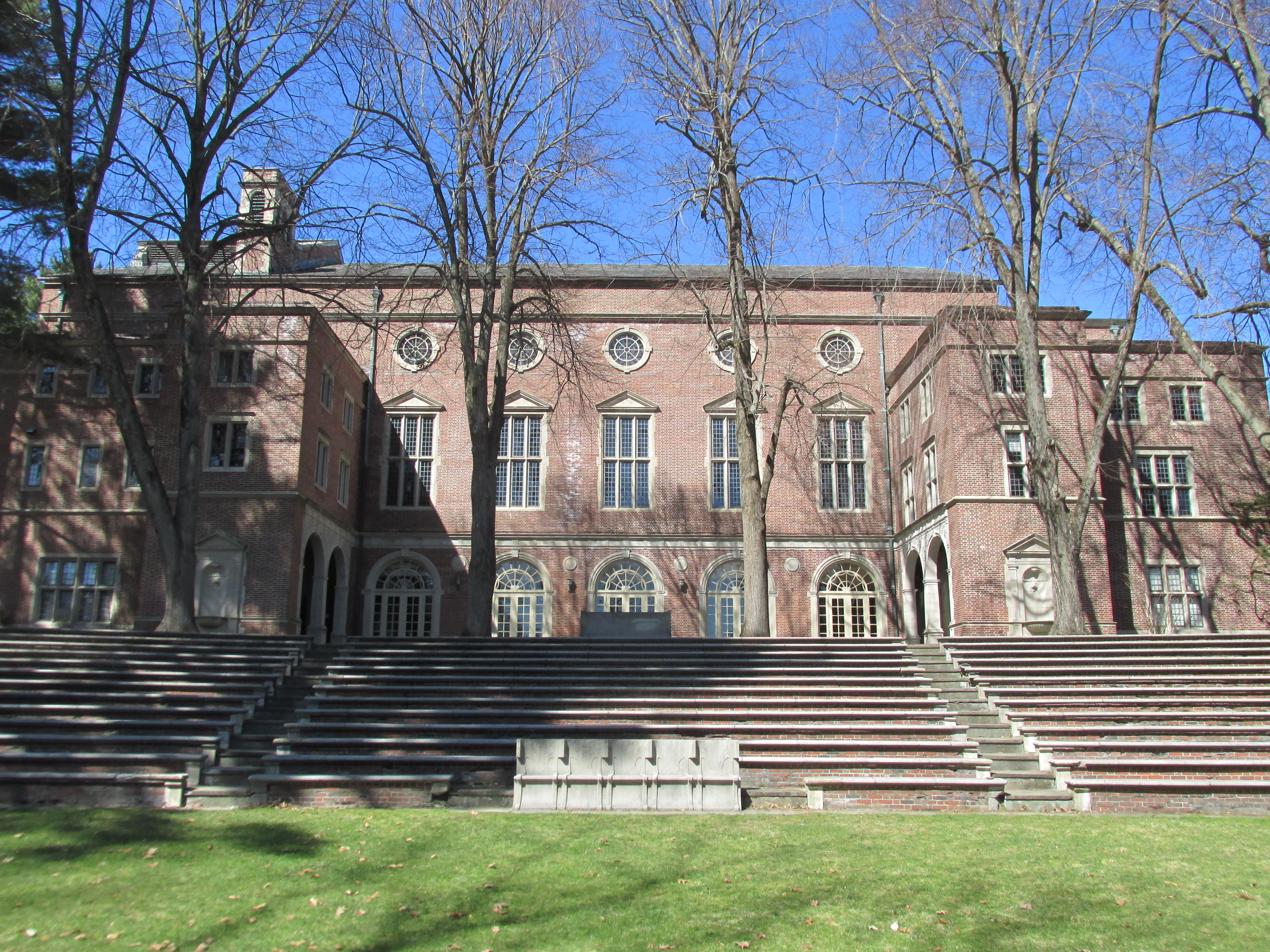
Wellesley College's Diana Chapman Walsh Alumnae Hall was renamed in Walsh's honor after its renovation in 2010.

Wellesley's Alumnae Hall was renamed the Diana Chapman Walsh Alumnae Hall in Walsh's honor after its 2010 renovation. The hall was originally constructed in 1923, but was cramped and inaccessible. Following its highly successful renovation by Ann Beha Architects (renamed Annum Architects in 2022), it is now home to a 1,000-seat auditorium and the college's Theater Studies Department, and is the site of many of the college's most important events.

== Academic career ==
Previously, Walsh was the Norman Professor at the Harvard School of Public Health, and chair of the Department of Health and Social Behavior. There she developed and led an interdisciplinary program in society and health, an educational initiative in cancer prevention, a program of studies on social norms and substance abuse, and a project on social marketing for public health. Before that, she was at Boston University, as a University Professor, and Professor of Social and Behavioral Sciences in the School of Public Health.

Walsh is a 1966 graduate of Wellesley College, as an English major. At Boston University, she earned an M. S. degree in journalism in 1971 and, in 1983, a Ph.D. in health policy from the University Professors Program. She received the Wallerstein Award for the distinguished graduate thesis in journalism in 1971 and the Alumni Merit Award for the best graduate dissertation by a University Scholar in 1983.

She spent five years, in the early 1970s, as the information and education director for the Planned Parenthood League of Massachusetts, on whose board she continued to serve for a decade. She was senior staff associate of the Massachusetts Commissioner of Public Health and then associate director of the Health Policy Institute at Boston University, where she developed and ran a fellowship program in health policy for corporate executives. As a Kellogg National Fellow, from 1987 to 1990, she traveled extensively (to Spain, Russia, Iceland, Norway, Brazil and throughout the United States) studying workplace democracy and patterns of leadership, and writing poetry.

== Publications ==
Walsh has published on topics related to the organization and financing of health care services, the conservation of health, the prevention and treatment of substance abuse, the health effects of work and on a number of issues in higher education. Her empirical studies have appeared in professional and scholarly journals such as the New England Journal of Medicine, Health Affairs and the Journal of the American Medical Association, and she is the author of reviews, essays, commentaries, and case studies. She has written, edited and co-edited twelve books, including a nine-volume series on industry and health care published by Springer-Verlag, a study of the practice of medicine within corporations, Corporate Physicians: Between Medicine and Management, Yale University Press, 1987, a co-edited monograph entitled Society and Health and published by Oxford University Press, and an essay, "Trustworthy Leadership", published by the Fetzer Institute.

The MIT Press will publish her memoirs, tentatively titled The Claims of Life: A Memoir, in Fall 2023.

== Other positions ==
Walsh currently serves as chair of the board of the Broad Institute of MIT and Harvard, as a member of the corporation of the Massachusetts Institute of Technology. She is a trustee of the Henry J. Kaiser Family Foundation and of the Institute for Healthcare Improvement. She was a director of the State Street Corporation from 1999 to 2007 and a trustee of Amherst College from 1998 to 2010. She is a member of the American Academy of Arts and Sciences and of Phi Beta Kappa.

== Biographical notes ==
Her husband, Christopher T. Walsh, was the Hamilton Kuhn Professor in the Department of Molecular Pharmacology and Biological Chemistry at the Harvard Medical School. Their daughter, Allison Kurian, is an associate professor of medicine and health policy at Stanford University. Walsh's sister, Sally Chapman, was a professor at Barnard College. When she died in 2012, Walsh accepted the Barnard Medal of Distinction on her behalf.
