= Anaerobic oxidation of methane =

Microbial process in anoxic marine and freshwater sediments

Anaerobic oxidation of methane (AOM) is a methane-consuming microbial process occurring in anoxic marine and freshwater sediments. AOM is known to occur among mesophiles, but also in psychrophiles, thermophiles, halophiles, acidophiles, and alkophiles. During AOM, methane is oxidized with different terminal electron acceptors such as sulfate, nitrate, nitrite and metals, either alone or in syntrophy with a partner organism.

== Coupled to sulfate reduction ==
Three mechanisms of Anaerobic Oxidation of Methane (AOM). The first method (top) is mediated by a consortium of anaerobic methanotrophic (ANME) archaea from the clades 1,2a,2b & 2c and sulfate reducing bacteria (SRB). The oxidation of methane occurs in the ANME where electrons are passed directly to the SRB, which performs sulfate reduction . The second method (middle) links methane oxidation with nitrate reduction, mediated by consortia of ANME archaea and Anammox bacteria. The third mechanism (bottom) also links methane oxidation with nitrate reduction but is mediated by ANME archaea and NC10 bacteria. Unlike the first two mechanisms, both the ANME archaea and NC10 bacteria compete for methane.

The overall reaction is:

CH_{4} + SO_{4}^{2−} → HCO_{3}^{−} + HS^{−} + H_{2}O

Sulfate-driven AOM is mediated by a syntrophic consortium of methanotrophic archaea and sulfate-reducing bacteria. They often form small aggregates or sometimes voluminous mats. The archaeal partner is abbreviated ANME, which stands for "anaerobic methanotroph". ANME's are very closely related to methanogenic archaea and recent investigations suggest that AOM is an enzymatic reversal of methanogenesis. It is still poorly understood how the syntrophic partners interact and which intermediates are exchanged between the archaeal and bacterial cell. The research on AOM is hindered by the fact that the responsible organisms have not been isolated. This is because these organisms show very slow growth rates with a minimum doubling time of a few months. Countless isolation efforts have not been able to isolate one of the anaerobic methanotrophs, a possible explanation can be that the ANME archaea and the SRB have an obligate syntrophic interaction and can therefore not be isolated individually.

In benthic marine areas with strong methane releases from fossil reservoirs (e.g. at cold seeps, mud volcanoes or gas hydrate deposits) AOM can be so high that chemosynthetic organisms like filamentous sulfur bacteria (see Beggiatoa) or animals (clams, tube worms) with symbiont sulfide-oxidizing bacteria can thrive on the large amounts of hydrogen sulfide that are produced during AOM. The bicarbonate (HCO_{3}^{−}) produced from AOM can (i) get sequestered in the sediments by the precipitation of calcium carbonate or so-called methane-derived authigenic carbonates and (ii) get released to the overlying water column. Methane-derived authigenic carbonates are known to be the most ^{13}C depleted carbonates on Earth, with δ^{13}C values as low as -125 per mil PDB reported.

== Coupled to nitrate and nitrite reduction ==
The overall reactions are:

CH_{4} + 4 NO_{3}^{−} → CO_{2} + 4 NO_{2}^{−} + 2 H_{2}O
3 CH_{4} + 8 NO_{2}^{−} + 8 H^{+} → 3 CO_{2} + 4 N_{2} + 10 H_{2}O

ANME-2d is shown to be responsible nitrate-driven AOM. The ANME-2d, named Methanoperedens nitroreducens, is able to perform nitrate-driven AOM without a partner organism via reverse methanogenesis with nitrate as the terminal electron acceptor, using genes for nitrate reduction that have been laterally transferred from a bacterial donor. This was also the first complete reverse methanogenesis pathway including the mcr and mer genes.

In 2010, omics, especially metagenomics, analysis showed that nitrite reduction can be coupled to methane oxidation by a single bacterial species Candidatus Methylomirabilis oxyfera (phylum NC10), without the need for an archaeal partner.

== Environmental relevance ==
AOM is considered an important process reducing the emission of the greenhouse gas methane from the ocean into the atmosphere. It is estimated that almost 80% of all the methane that arises from marine sediments is oxidized anaerobically by this process.

== See also ==
- Borg (microbiology)

== Bibliography ==
- Dennis D. Coleman; J. Bruno Risatti; Martin Schoell (1981) Fractionation of carbon and hydrogen isotopes by methane-oxidizing bacteria | Geochimica et Cosmochimica Acta |Volume 45, Issue 7, July 1981, Pages 1033-1037 |https://doi.org/10.1016/0016-7037(81)90129-0 | abstract
