= Allison Kurian =

American medical oncologist

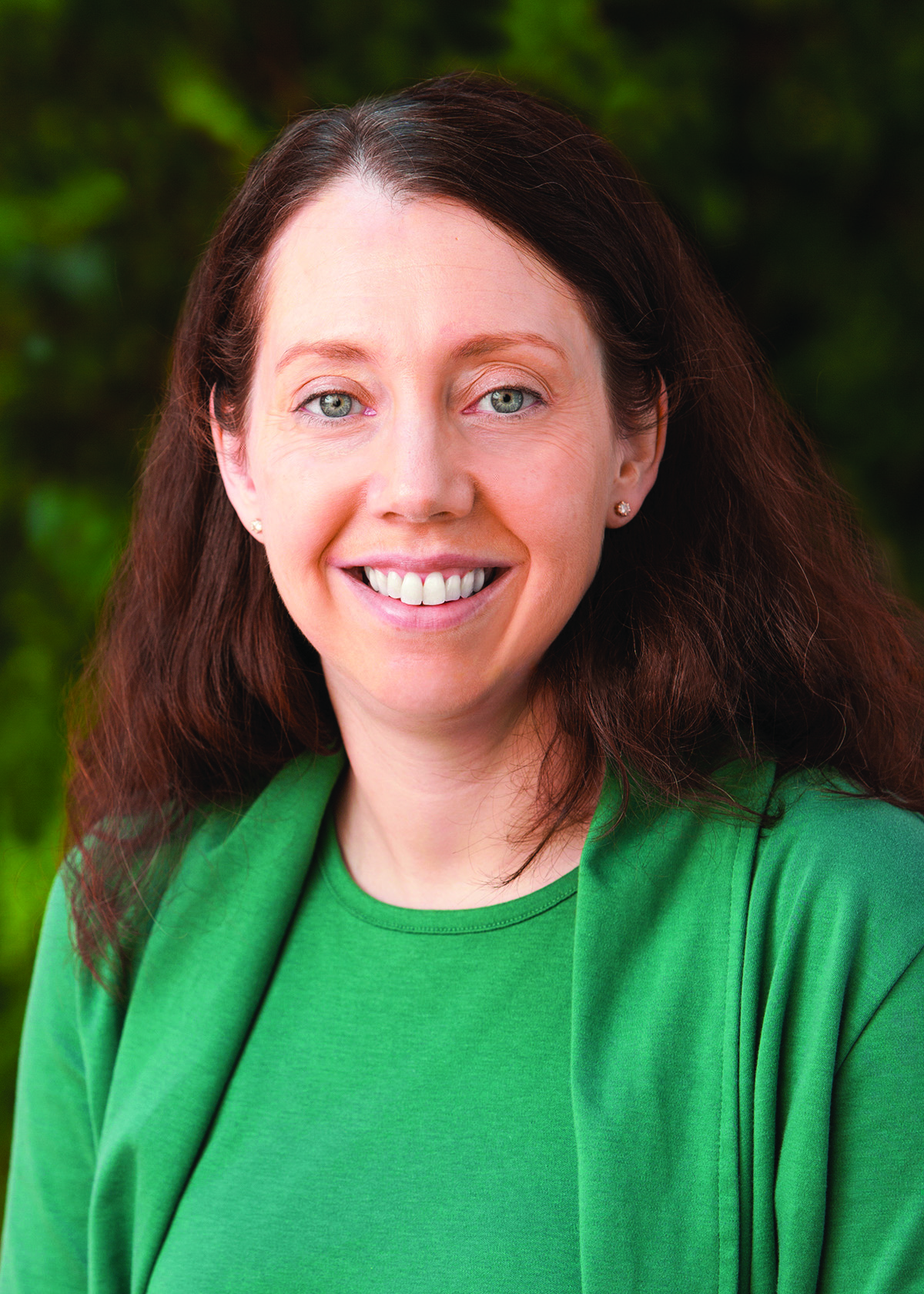
- Born: Boston, Massachusetts, USA
- Spouse: Thomas Kurian
- Relatives: Diana Chapman Walsh (mother); Christopher T. Walsh (father)

Academic background
- Education: BA, Human Biology, 1995; M.Sc., Epidemiology, 2006, Stanford University; MD-Medical Education, 1999, Harvard Medical School

Academic work
- Institutions: Stanford University School of Medicine

Allison Walsh Kurian is an American medical oncologist. She is a professor of Medicine and Epidemiology & Population Health at Stanford University and an oncologist at the Stanford Cancer Institute. She currently serves as the Colleen Haas Chair for Stanford University's School of Medicine.

== Early life and education ==
Kurian was born to two academic parents; Diana Chapman Walsh, the former President of Wellesley College, and Christopher T. Walsh, a biochemist at Harvard University. Kurian earned her Bachelor of Arts degree in Human Biology at Stanford University before earning her medical degree from Harvard Medical School. She completed her residency training in Internal Medicine at the Massachusetts General Hospital and her medical fellowship in Medical Oncology at Stanford University, where she was simultaneously earning a master's degree in epidemiology.

== Career ==
Upon completing her fellowship, Kurian accepted a research scholar position supported by a Building Interdisciplinary Research Careers in Women's Health K12 award. In her role as an instructor in the Division of Oncology at the Stanford Cancer Genetics Clinic, she partook in an international study focusing on experimental technology to bring higher resolution and fewer risks than mammography and magnetic resonance imaging. In March 2008, she was appointed an assistant professor of medicine and health research and policy at Stanford University. Her research focus was on identifying risk for breast and ovarian cancer. By July, she received a Physician Faculty Scholars Award from the Robert Wood Johnson Foundation to fund her study, "Optimizing the use of breast cancer risk-reduction strategies by patients and physicians." Kurian and her research team discovered that models used to identify cancer risks in women worked better on white women than other ethnic groups. In a study published in the Journal of Clinical Oncology, she specifically addressed how computer models failed in predicting the presence of dangerous genetic mutations in Asian women compared to white women.

In 2011, Kurian collaborated with epidemiologist and biostatistician Alice S. Whittemore to examine how women related to patients of hereditary mutation breast cancer, but lacked the mutation themselves, were of no higher risk of getting cancer than relatives of patients with other types of breast cancer. The next year, she was appointed director of Stanford Women's Clinical Cancer Genetics Program and sat on the Advisory Committee for the California Health Care Foundation. In this role, she continued to research on the identification of women with elevated breast and gynecologic cancer risk and the development of new techniques for early cancer detection and risk reduction. This resulted in the development of an online tool that helps people with BRCA mutations make preventive care decisions. In 2014, she conducted a study with Scarlett Gomez which found that breast cancer patients who undergo bilateral mastectomy are not guaranteed better survival rates. In a retrospective study, Kurian and colleagues found that fewer than half resumed endocrine therapy after pregnancy, and about 19% experienced cancer recurrence or death, which was roughly double the expected rate.

On December 1, 2015, Kurian was promoted to associate professor of medicine, health research, and policy. In this role, she collaborated with doctors at Emory University and the University of Michigan to study 83,000 women diagnosed with breast or ovarian cancer in California and Georgia between 2013 and 2014. The result of the study revealed that fewer than a quarter of the patients studied underwent genetic testing for cancer-associated mutations, thus highlighting gaps between national guidelines for testing and actual testing practices. In 2020, she was elected to the American Society for Clinical Investigation.

In 2024, Kurian and colleague Jennifer Caswell-Jin were awarded the SCI Equity Impact Research Grant Challenge Award for their contributions to cancer research and treatment, specifically their project, "Cascade testing for genetic cancer risk and follow-up care in rural Californian communities." Dr. Kurian's overall work continues to focus on identifying increased breast and gynecologic cancer risk and improving screening and detection technology. Currently, as the director of Stamford Women's Clinical Cancer Genetics Program, she is trying to use Artificial intelligence to aid with data retrieval. Which can hopefully speed up the process so she can focus more on her paitents' health.

At Stanford Cancer Institute Kurian and her partner Summer Han Ph.D., an associate professor of neurosurgery and of medicine, are co-leading a project to coordinate patient information throughout healthcare systems and cancer registries. This initiative uses the Stanford-Sutter Health Oncoshare project, which is a database that connects peoples electronic health records. This would allow for a connect between Stanford and Sutter Health with the California Cancer Registry.
