= Welch Award in Chemistry =

The Welch Award in Chemistry is awarded annually by the Robert A. Welch Foundation, based in Houston, Texas, to encourage and recognize basic chemical research for the benefit of mankind. The award, which has been given since 1972, is one of the largest and most prestigious awards in the field of chemistry. Several of its recipients subsequently were awarded the Nobel Prize.

The award is named in honor of Robert Alonzo Welch, who made a fortune in oil and minerals and had a strong belief in the ability of chemistry to make the world a better place. In his will, Mr. Welch stated: “I have long been impressed with the great possibilities for the betterment of Mankind that lay in the field of research in the domain of Chemistry.” The prize has a value of $500,000.

== Recipients ==
Source: Welch Foundation

Year	Recipient
1972	Karl August Folkers, The University of Texas at Austin
1974	Albert Eschenmoser, Swiss Federal Institute of Technology
1976	Neil Bartlett, University of California, Berkeley
1978	Edgar Bright Wilson, Harvard University
1980	Sune Bergström, Karolinska Institute
1981	Paul Doughty Bartlett, Texas Christian University
1982	Frank Westheimer, Harvard University
1983	Henry Taube, Stanford University
1984	Kenneth Pitzer, University of California, Berkeley
1985	Duilio Arigoni, Swiss Federal Institute of Technology
1986	George C. Pimentel, University of California, Berkeley
1987	Harry George Drickamer, University of Illinois at Urbana-Champaign
1988	Richard Barry Bernstein, University of California, Los Angeles
1989	Norman R. Davidson, California Institute of Technology
1990	John D. Roberts, California Institute of Technology
1990	William von Eggers Doering, Harvard University
1991	Earl R. Stadtman, National Institutes of Health
1991	Edwin G. Krebs, Howard Hughes Medical Institute, University of Washington
1992	Richard Smalley, Rice University
1993	Gilbert Stork, Columbia University
1994	Jack Halpern, The University of Chicago
1994	F. Albert Cotton, Texas A&M University
1995	Jeremy R. Knowles, Harvard University
1995	Robert H. Abeles, Brandeis University
1996	Koji Nakanishi, Columbia University
1997	Ahmed Zewail, California Institute of Technology
1998	Pierre Chambon, College de France
1999	Richard Zare, Stanford University
2000	A. Ian Scott, Texas A&M University
2000	Sir Alan R. Battersby, Cambridge University
2001	Roger D. Kornberg, Stanford University
2002	Harden M. McConnell, Stanford University
2003	Ronald Breslow, Columbia University
2004	Allen J. Bard, The University of Texas at Austin
2005	George M. Whitesides, Harvard University
2006	Daniel E. Koshland, Jr., University of California, Berkeley
2007	William H. Miller, University of California, Berkeley
2007	Noel S. Hush, University of Sydney
2008	Alexander Rich, Massachusetts Institute of Technology
2009	Harry B. Gray, California Institute of Technology
2010	JoAnne Stubbe, Massachusetts Institute of Technology; Christopher T. Walsh, Harvard Medical School
2011	John S. Waugh, Massachusetts Institute of Technology
2012	David A. Evans, Harvard University
2013	Louis E. Brus, Columbia University
2014	Robert G. Bergman, University of California, Berkeley
2015	Stephen C. Harrison, Harvard Medical School
2016	Richard H. Holm, Harvard University; Stephen J. Lippard, Massachusetts Institute of Technology
2017	John B. Goodenough, University of Texas at Austin
2018	Adriaan Bax, National Institute of Diabetes and Digestive and Kidney Diseases
2019	Armand Paul Alivisatos, University of California Berkeley; Charles M. Lieber, Harvard University
2020	Steven L. McKnight, The University of Texas Southwestern Medical Center
2021	Chi-Huey Wong, The Scripps Research Institute
2022	Carolyn R. Bertozzi, Stanford University
2023	Jacqueline Barton, California Institute of Technology
2024	Eric N. Jacobsen, Harvard University
2025	Stuart L. Schreiber, Harvard University; Peter G. Schultz, Scripps Research
2026	Robert S. Langer, Massachusetts Institute of Technology

== See also ==
- List of chemistry awards
- List of prizes named after people
