= Borg (microbiology) =

Aspect of DNA sequences

Borgs features including tandem, direct, and inverted repeats.

Borgs are large (up to ~1 Mbp) extrachromosomal linear DNA elements found in methanotrophic archaea (specifically Methanoperedens spp.) that live in oxygen-starved environments such as deep mud. They have been found in organisms isolated from wetland, aquifer, and riverbed environments, as well as a deserted mercury mine, in California and Colorado. They were first described by Basem Al-Shayeb and Jill Banfield in 2022.

The nature of Borgs remains unclear; they are thought to be "giant linear plasmids" or giant viruses. At least 19 different types have been identified, all of which co-occur within Methanoperedens, which shares many of their genes. Methanoperedens' main chromosome is only about three times larger than the Borgs it hosts. It is speculated that Borgs may augment Methanoperedens' capacity for anaerobic oxidation of methane and protein production.

== Discovery ==
Borgs were discovered on March 8, 2020, by Jill Banfield and her research group at the University of California, Berkeley. The name "Borg" was chosen as a reference to the Star Trek faction of the same name, due to the novel genetic elements' apparent propensity to assimilate genes from microbes, most notably Methanoperedens; the name was originally suggested by Banfield's son.

== Features ==
The structures of Borg genomes are conserved and distinct from the plasmids and chromosomes of Methanoperedens, as well as other archaeal genomes. Borgs do not contain protein-coding genes that are associated with plasmids or viruses; they also lack rRNA genes, origins of replication, or other vital genes and features that are commonly found within minichromosomes (also known as megaplasmids) found in archaea.

Borgs range from 0.66 to 0.92 Mbp in length, larger than the genomes of any known archaeal viruses. The sizes of Borg genomes are more characteristic of eukaryote-specific double-stranded DNA viruses from the phylum Nucleocytoviricota, also known as nucleocytoplasmic large DNA viruses (NCLDV), which can surpass 2.5 Mbp. Tandem direct repeat sequences are prevalent throughout Borg genomes, and they are terminated by inverted repeats. This differs from the megaplasmids of some bacteria, which carry interspaced repeats and usually are not responsible for encoding necessary genes.

Below is a list of genes known to be encoded by Borgs (note that not every Borg subtype contains the same genes):

- Mobile or transposable element defense systems
- Genes involved with the anaerobic oxidation of methane (AOM)
- Type III-A CRISPR-Cas system (No spacer acquisition machinery, primarily targets RNA)
- RPL11 (Ribosomal protein L11)
- Glycosyltransferase
- Genes involved in DNA and RNA manipulation
- Transport genes
- Genes involved in energy metabolism
- Genes encoding cell surface proteins
  - PEGA
  - S-layer
- Genes encoding membrane-associated proteins (unknown function, possibly affects host's membrane properties)
- nifHDK operon (involved in nitrogen fixation)
- Genes involved in polyhydroxyalkanoate synthesis (Carbon storage; possibly used for when resources are low)
- Genes encoding Tellurium resistance proteins
- FtsZ (tubulin homolog, involved in bactrial cell division)
- Major Vault Protein homologs
- TCA cycle genes
  - citrate synthase
  - aconitase
- cfbB and cfbC
- Coenzyme F420:L-glutamate ligase - cofE
- Electron bifurcating complexes
- D-Lactate dehydrogenase
- Genes involved in Tetrahydromethanopterin synthesis
- Genes encoding Ferredoxin proteins
- Genes encoding 5,6,7,8-tetrahydromethanopterin hydro-lyase (Fae) (involved in formaldehyde detoxification)
- Genes encoding Carbon monoxide dehydrogenase (CODH)
- Genes encoding plastocyanin
- Genes encoding cupredoxins
- Genes encoding multiheme cytochromes (MHC)
