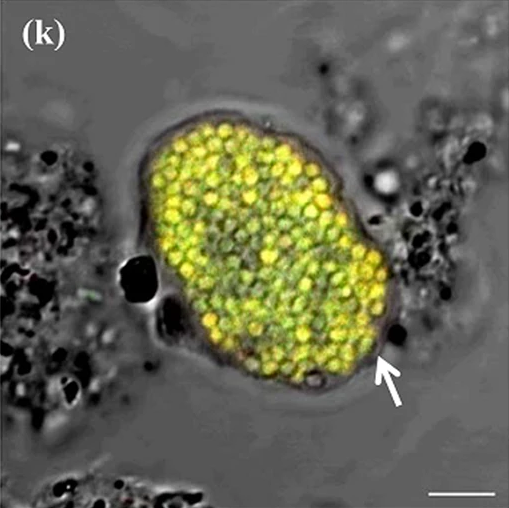
- CLSM image of a microcolony of NC10 bacteria (Ca. Methylomirabilis sinica)

Scientific classification (Candidatus)
- Domain: Bacteria
- Kingdom: incertae sedis
- Phylum: Methylomirabilota

Orders
- "Rokubacteriales"; "Methylomirabilales"

Synonyms
- "Rokubacteria" Hug et al. 2016

= NC10 phylum =

Phylum of bacteria

NC10 is a bacterial phylum with candidate status, meaning its members remain uncultured to date. The difficulty in producing lab cultures may be linked to low growth rates and other limiting growth factors.

Ca. Methylomirabilis oxyfera, a member of the NC10 phylum, is the first organism discovered to couple methane oxidation to the reduction of nitrite to dinitrogen (N_{2}). This is significant for several reasons. First, there are only three other biological pathways known to produce oxygen (photosynthesis, chlorate respiration, and the detoxification of reactive oxygen species). Second, anaerobic methane oxidation (AMO) coupled to nitrite reduction links the global carbon and nitrogen cycles, and thus denitrifying methanotrophs in the NC10 phylum may influence methane content in the atmosphere. Third, this finding opens the possibility that oxygen was available in the atmosphere prior to the evolution of oxygenic photosynthesis and the Great Oxidation Event, which challenges certain aspects of modern theories regarding the evolution of early life on Earth.

The NC10 phylum was first proposed in 2003 on the basis of highly divergent 16S rRNA gene sequences from aquatic microbial formations in flooded caves (Nullarbor caves, Australia). The first genome insights for the phylum were published in 2010. Members of the NC10 phylum have been detected in environments including the Brunssummerheide peatlands (Limburg, Netherlands), the deep stratified Lake Zug (Central Switzerland), and a paddy field with long-term fertilization (Hangzhou, China)

NC10 species proposed to date include Ca. Methylomirabilis oxyfera and Ca. Methylomirabilis lanthanidiphila

== Taxonomy ==
120 marker proteins based GTDB 07-RS207

- - "Rokubacteriales"
  - "Ca. Methylomirabilis"
    - "Ca. M. limnetica"
    - - "Ca. M. lanthanidiphila"
      - "Ca. M. oxygeniifera"

The currently accepted taxonomy is based on the List of Prokaryotic names with Standing in Nomenclature (LPSN) and National Center for Biotechnology Information (NCBI). However many taxonomic names are taken from the Genome Taxonomy Database release 06-RS202.

- Class "Methylomirabilia"
  - Order "Rokubacteriales" (CSP1-6)
  - Order "Methylomirabilales" Cabrol et al. 2020 (NC10)
    - Family "Methylomirabilaceae"
      - Genus "Candidatus Methylomirabilis" Ettwig et al. 2010
        - "Ca. M. lanthanidiphila" Versantvoort et al. 2018
        - "Ca. M. limnetica" Graf et al. 2018
        - "Ca. M. oxygeniifera" corrig. Ettwig et al. 2010
        - "Ca. M. sinica" He et al. 2016
