= Methane monooxygenase (particulate) =

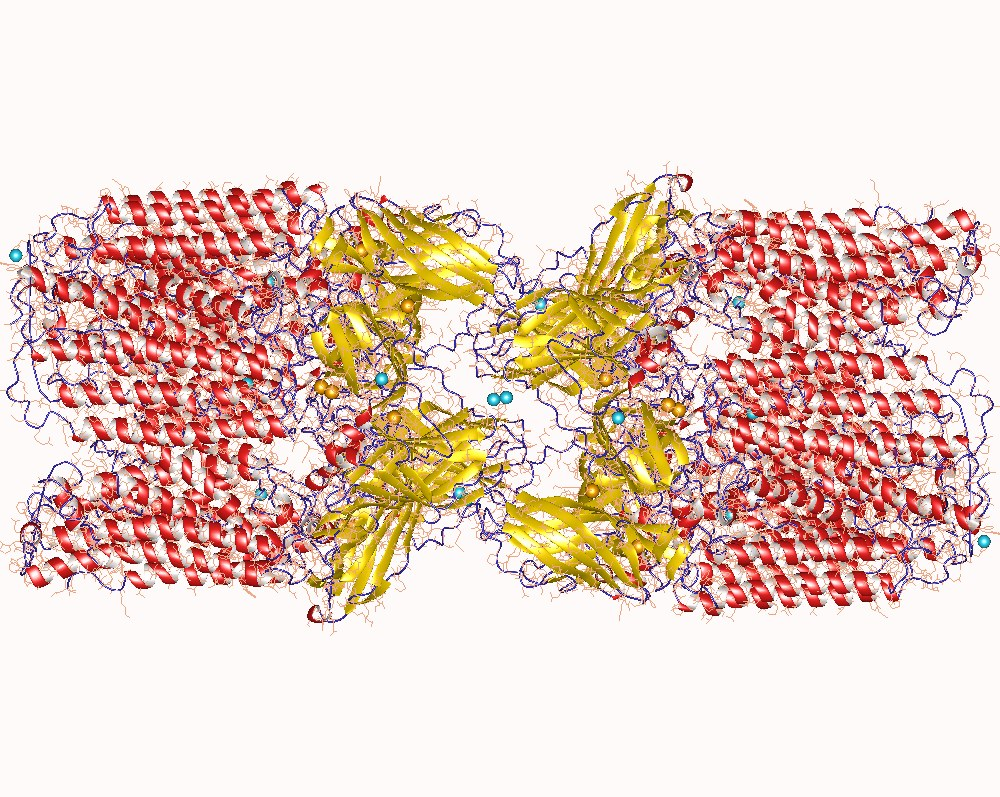
- Particulate methane monooxygenase hexa-heterotrimer, Methylococcus capsulatus

Identifiers
- EC no.: 1.14.18.3

Databases
- IntEnz: IntEnz view
- BRENDA: BRENDA entry
- ExPASy: NiceZyme view
- KEGG: KEGG entry
- MetaCyc: metabolic pathway
- PRIAM: profile
- PDB structures: RCSB PDB PDBe PDBsum
Search
- PMC: articles
- PubMed: articles
- NCBI: proteins

Methane monooxygenase (particulate) (EC 1.14.18.3) is an enzyme with systematic name methane,quinol:oxygen oxidoreductase. This enzyme catalyses the following chemical reaction

methane + quinol + O_{2} $\rightleftharpoons$ methanol + quinone + H_{2}O

Methane monooxygenase contains copper. It is membrane-bound enzyme present in methanotrophs.

== See also ==
- Methane monooxygenase
