= Metallomics (journal) =

Academic journal

- Discipline: Chemistry, biology
- Language: English
- Edited by: David Giedroc

Publication details
- History: 2009-2020, 2021-present
- Publisher: Oxford University Press, previously Royal Society of Chemistry (United Kingdom)
- Frequency: Monthly
- Open access: Hybrid
- Impact factor: 3.796 (2020)

Standard abbreviations
- ISO 4: Metallomics

Indexing
- CODEN: METAJS
- ISSN: 1756-5901 (print); 1756-591X (web)
- LCCN: 2009243228
- OCLC no.: 437817445

Links
- Journal homepage

Metallomics is a monthly peer-reviewed scientific journal covering the growing research field of metallomics. The journal's scope is aimed at "elucidating the identification, distribution, dynamics, role and impact of metals and metalloids in biological systems". It is published by the Royal Society of Chemistry. The executive editor is Jeanne Andres, while the current chair of the editorial board is David Giedroc at Indiana University Bloomington.

== Abstracting and indexing ==
The journal is abstracted and indexed in:

- Chemical Abstracts Service/CASSI
- PubMed/MEDLINE
- Science Citation Index
- Scopus

According to the Journal Citation Reports, the journal has a 2020 impact factor of 4.526.
