= Christopher T. Walsh =

American biochemist (1944–2023)

- Born: February 16, 1944; Boston, Massachusetts, U.S.
- Died: January 10, 2023 (aged 78)
- Education: Harvard University (BA); Rockefeller University (PhD)
- Known for: Enzyme catalysis Antibiotic resistance Post-translational modification
- Spouse: Diana Chapman Walsh
- Children: Allison Kurian
- Awards: Eli Lilly Award in Biological Chemistry (1979); Arthur C. Cope Scholar Award (1998); Repligen Corporation Award in Chemistry of Biological Processes (1999); Alfred Bader Award in Bioinorganic or Bioorganic Chemistry (2003); Promega Biotechnology Research Award (2004); Welch Award in Chemistry (2010); Benjamin Franklin Medal (2014)
- Scientific career
- Fields: Biochemistry
- Institutions: Brandeis University; Massachusetts Institute of Technology; Harvard Medical School; Dana Farber Cancer Institute
- Thesis: The Mechanism of Action of the Citrate Cleavage Enzyme (1970)
- Doctoral advisor: Leonard B. Spector
- Other academic advisors: E. O. Wilson; Robert H. Abeles
- Doctoral students: Melissa J. Moore; Paula J. Olsiewski
- Other notable students: Michael A. Marletta; Elizabeth M. Nolan; Ronald T. Raines; Peter G. Schultz; Gregory L. Verdine

Christopher T. Walsh (February 16, 1944 – January 10, 2023) was the Hamilton Kuhn professor of biological chemistry and pharmacology at Harvard Medical School. His research focused on enzymes and enzyme inhibition, and most recently focused on the problem of antibiotic resistance. He was elected to the National Academy of Sciences in 1989.

== Education ==
He earned his A.B. degree in biology from Harvard University in 1965. As an undergraduate, he worked with E. O. Wilson and published a first-author paper in the journal Nature, where he and his colleagues described the composition of the fire ant trail substance. He went on to graduate school at Rockefeller University, where he earned his Ph.D. in life science in 1970.

== Career ==
Walsh completed a postdoctoral fellowship with Robert Abeles at Brandeis University in 1972, and later that year joined the faculty at Massachusetts Institute of Technology as a professor of chemistry and biology. In 1987, he joined the faculty at Harvard Medical School to serve as the chair of the newly created Department of Biological Chemistry and Molecular Pharmacology. He served as the president and CEO of the Dana–Farber Cancer Institute from 1992 to 1995. Walsh authored more than 650 publications in scholarly journals and trained several graduate students and postdoctoral researchers. Among his professional activities, Walsh was a member of the Board of Scientific Governors of The Scripps Research Institute, the American Philosophical Society, The National Academy of Sciences, Institute of Medicine, American Academy of Arts and Sciences, and the American Academy of Microbiology.

== Personal life ==
Walsh was born in Boston and went to Roxbury Latin School. Walsh died following a fall on January 10, 2023, at the age of 78. He was married to Diana Chapman Walsh who was the president of Wellesley College from 1993 to 2007. They have one daughter, Allison Kurian, a professor of medicine and epidemiology at Stanford University.

== Notable publications ==
=== Books ===
- Enzymatic Reaction Mechanisms (1978). Published by Freeman Inc (ISBN 978-0-7167-0070-8).
- Antibiotics: Actions, Origins, Resistance (2003), by Christopher Walsh. Published by ASM Press (ISBN 978-1-55581-254-6).
- Post-translation Modification of Proteins: Expanding Nature's Inventory (2006), by C.T. Walsh. Published by Roberts and Company (ISBN 0-9747077-3-2).
