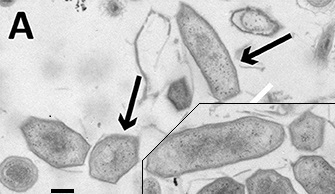
- Ca. Methylomirabilis sp. Scale bar; 200 nm.

Scientific classification (Candidatus)
- Domain: Bacteria
- Phylum: "Methylomirabilota"
- Class: "Methanomicrobia"
- Order: "Methylomirabilales"
- Family: "Methylomirabilaceae"
- Genus: Ca. Methylomirabilis

Binomial name
- Ca. Methylomirabilis oxygeniifera corrig. Ettwig et al. 2010

= Methylomirabilis oxyfera =

Candidatus Methylomirabilis oxyfera

Bacteria species

Candidatus Methylomirabilis oxyfera is a candidate species of Gram-negative bacteria belonging to the NC10 phylum, characterized for its capacity to couple anaerobic methane oxidation with nitrite reduction in anoxic environments. To acquire oxygen for methane oxidation, Ca. M. oxyfera utilizes an intra-aerobic pathway through the reduction of nitrite (NO_{2}) to dinitrogen (N_{2}) and oxygen.

== Enrichment ==
Enriched Ca. M. oxyfera cells have been identified as primarily having a unique polygonal cell shape through the use of electron microscopy techniques. Unlike methanotrophic Pseudomonadota, Ca. M. oxyfera cells lack intracytoplasmic membranes when grown under laboratory conditions. The optimum growth ranges for Ca. M. oxyfera is between pH 7-8 and 25-30 °C. Ca. M. oxyfera cell envelopes are Gram-negative and are generally 0.25–0.5 μm in diameter and 0.8–1.1 μm in length.

== Methane oxidation ==
Ca. M. oxyfera has the capacity to disproportionate nitric oxide into oxygen and nitrogen gas. This intermediate oxygen is then used in the oxidation of methane into carbon dioxide.

=== Overall reactions ===
Nitrogen oxide dismutation:

2 NO^{−}_{2} → 2 NO → N_{2} + O_{2}

Methane oxidation:

O_{2} + CH_{4} → CH_{3}OH → CO_{2}

== Environmental significance ==
Ca. M. oxyfera has been identified in several environments including rice paddy soil in China, multiple river and lake sediments, and wastewater sludge in The Netherlands. Ca. M. oxyfera is predicted to inhabit environments with high concentrations of nitrogen and methane, near boundaries that separate oxic and anoxic zones. It is suggested that Ca. M. oxyfera and similar organisms contribute to the global carbon and nitrogen cycles. These organisms may also play a role in reducing the nutrient loads within freshwater ecosystems that have been contaminated with fertilizers. Nitrites are usually undesirable in the environment, can be detrimental to human health, and can lead to eutrophication of aquatic ecosystems and algal blooms. Meanwhile methane is a potent greenhouse gas that has a stronger greenhouse potential per molecule than carbon dioxide. The presence of organisms like Ca. M. oxyfera can therefore be beneficial in many environments and might be used for bioremediation or sewage treatment in the future.
