= Methanotroph =

Type of microorganism that uses methane as a carbon source

Methanotrophs (sometimes called methanophiles) are prokaryotes that metabolize methane as their source of carbon and chemical energy. They are bacteria or archaea, can grow aerobically or anaerobically, and require single-carbon compounds to survive.

Methanotrophs are especially common in or near environments where methane is produced, although some methanotrophs can oxidize atmospheric methane. Their habitats include wetlands, soils, marshes, rice paddies, landfills, aquatic systems (lakes, oceans, streams) and more. They are of special interest to researchers studying global warming, as they play a significant role in the global methane budget, by reducing the amount of methane emitted to the atmosphere.

Methanotrophy is a special case of methylotrophy, using single-carbon compounds that are more reduced than carbon dioxide. Some methylotrophs, however, can also make use of multi-carbon compounds; this differentiates them from methanotrophs, which are usually fastidious methane and methanol oxidizers. The only facultative methanotrophs isolated to date are members of the genus Methylocella silvestris, Methylocapsa aurea and several Methylocystis strains.

In functional terms, methanotrophs are referred to as methane-oxidizing bacteria. However, methane-oxidizing bacteria encompass other organisms that are not regarded as sole methanotrophs. For this reason, methane-oxidizing bacteria have been separated into subgroups: methane-assimilating bacteria (MAB) groups, the methanotrophs, and autotrophic ammonia-oxidizing bacteria (AAOB), which cooxidize methane.

== Classification ==
Methanotrophs can be either bacteria (aerobic and anerobic) or archaea (anaerobic only). Which methanotroph species is present is mainly determined by the availability of electron acceptors. Many types of methane oxidizing bacteria (MOB) are known with subclassifications being formed based on their different methods of formaldehyde fixation. There are several subgroups among the methanotrophic archaea.

Methanotrophs have been historically classified broadly into three types which are defined by physiology, mechanism of methane metabolism, and morphology: Type I, II and X. More recent literature has complicated these types by identifying overlapping characteristics in genetic makeup and the environmental conditions in which they are most likely to occur. Generally, Type I methanotrophs tend to dominate in cold, anaerobic environments, meaning there is limited oxygen availability, which often have high methane concentrations. However, at a high enough salinity, Type II will dominate even in cold temperatures. Type II methanotrophs tend to be more tolerant of stress and dominate in methane limited environments and acidic pHs. As methanotroph research expands, there is less of a clear line between Type I and II methanotrophs, so familial or species classifications are more useful for grouping these organisms as seen in Table 1. This table helps illuminate that methanotrophs that favor extreme environments, like hydrothermal vents, tend to uptake methane via the Calvin-Benson-Bassham Cycle (CBB). Research to understand why certain methanotrophs favor certain conditions and assimilation pathways is ongoing and relevant to predicting methanotroph responses to climate change.

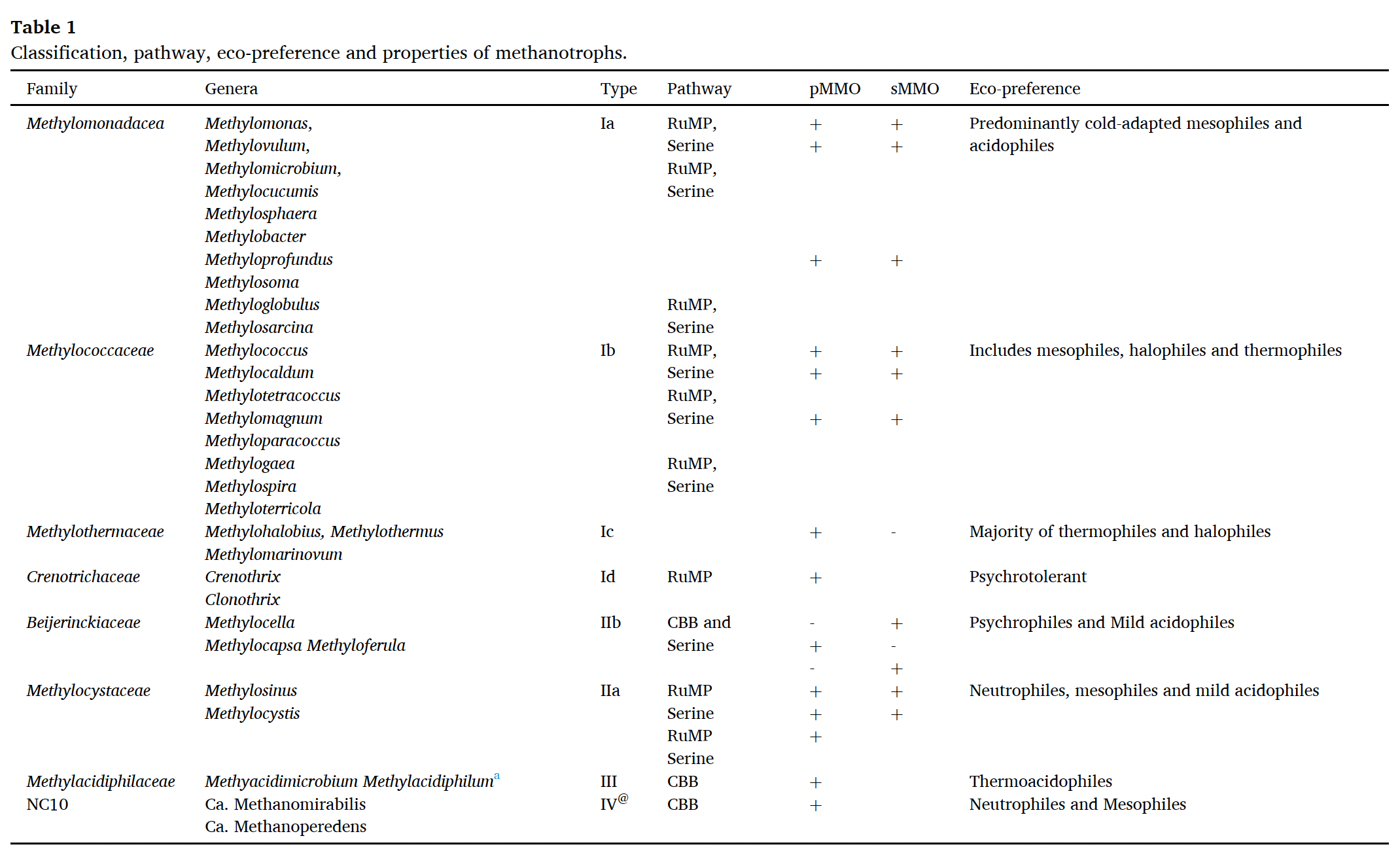
Table 1: An updated classification of methanotrophs based on family. Displays the inability to distinguish between methanotrophs based upon methane oxidation pathway and environmental conditions alone. Taken from Fenibo et al., 2023.

=== Aerobic ===
Under aerobic conditions, methanotrophs combine oxygen and methane to form formaldehyde, which is then incorporated into organic compounds via the serine pathway or the ribulose monophosphate (RuMP) pathway, and carbon dioxide, which is released. Type I and type X methanotrophs are part of the Gammaproteobacteria and they use the RuMP pathway to assimilate carbon. Type II methanotrophs are part of the Alphaproteobacteria and use the serine pathway of carbon assimilation. They also characteristically have a system of internal membranes within which methane oxidation occurs. Methanotrophs in Gammaproteobacteria are known from the family Methylococcaceae. Methanotrophs from Alphaproteobacteria are found in families Methylocystaceae and Beijerinckiaceae.

Aerobic methanotrophs are also known from the Methylacidiphilaceae (phylum Verrucomicrobiota). In contrast to Gammaproteobacteria and Alphaproteobacteria, methanotrophs in the phylum Verrucomicrobiota are mixotrophs. In 2021 a bacterial bin from the phylum Gemmatimonadota called "Candidatus Methylotropicum kingii" showing aerobic methanotrophy was discovered thus suggesting methanotrophy to be present in the four bacterial phyla.

In some cases, aerobic methane oxidation can take place in anoxic environments. "Candidatus Methylomirabilis oxyfera" belongs to the phylum NC10 bacteria, and can catalyze nitrite reduction through an "intra-aerobic" pathway, in which internally produced oxygen is used to oxidise methane. In clear water lakes, methanotrophs can live in the anoxic water column, but receive oxygen from photosynthetic organisms, which they then directly consume to oxidize methane.

No aerobic methanotrophic archaea are known.

=== Anaerobic ===
Under anoxic conditions, methanotrophs use different electron acceptors for methane oxidation. This can happen in anoxic habitats such as marine or lake sediments, oxygen minimum zones, anoxic water columns, rice paddies and soils. Some specific methanotrophs can reduce nitrate, nitrite, iron, sulfate, or manganese ions and couple that to methane oxidation without syntrophic partner. Investigations in marine environments revealed that methane can be oxidized anaerobically by consortia of methane oxidizing archaea and sulfate-reducing bacteria. This type of anaerobic oxidation of methane (AOM) mainly occurs in anoxic marine sediments. The exact mechanism is still a topic of debate but the most widely accepted theory is that the archaea use the reversed methanogenesis pathway to produce carbon dioxide and another, unknown intermediate, which is then used by the sulfate-reducing bacteria to gain energy from the reduction of sulfate to hydrogen sulfide and water.

The anaerobic methanotrophs are not related to the known aerobic methanotrophs; the closest cultured relatives to the anaerobic methanotrophs are the methanogens in the order Methanosarcinales.

=== Special species ===
Methylococcus capsulatus is used to produce animal feed from natural gas.

In 2010 a new bacterium Candidatus Methylomirabilis oxyfera from the phylum NC10 was identified that can couple the anaerobic oxidation of methane to nitrite reduction without the need for a syntrophic partner. Based on studies of Ettwig et al., it is believed that M. oxyfera oxidizes methane anaerobically by utilizing oxygen produced internally from the dismutation of nitric oxide into nitrogen and oxygen gas.

In addition to providing a natural methane sink, methanotrophs provide other services for humans. In wastewater treatment plants, the application of a mix of methanotrophic bacteria has the potential to reduce costs and increase overall efficiency at removing nitrogen and byproducts. Depending upon environmental conditions, these methanotrophs can also produce biomolecules during the wastewater treatment process that are useful for a wide range of applications. For example, methanotrophs undergoing glycolysis produce exopolysaccharides (EPS) which can be extracted and used in medicine. A well-known EPS is hyaluronic acid which is used widely in cosmetics and wound care.

== Taxonomy ==
Many methanotrophic cultures have been isolated and formally characterized over the past 5 decades, starting with the classical study of Whittenbury (Whittenbury et al., 1970). Currently, 18 genera of cultivated aerobic methanotrophic Gammaproteobacteria and 5 genera of Alphaproteobacteria are known, represented by approx. 60 different species.

== Methane oxidation ==
RuMP pathway in type I methanotrophs

Serine pathway in type II methanotrophs

Methanotrophs oxidize methane by first initiating reduction of molecular oxygen (O_{2}) to hydrogen peroxide (H_{2}O_{2}) and transformation of methane to methanol (CH_{3}OH) using methane monooxygenases (MMOs). Furthermore, two types of MMO have been isolated from methanotrophs: soluble methane monooxygenase (sMMO) and particulate methane monooxygenase (pMMO).

Cells containing pMMO have demonstrated higher growth capabilities and higher affinity for methane than sMMO containing cells. It is suspected that copper ions may play a key role in both pMMO regulation and the enzyme catalysis, thus limiting pMMO cells to more copper-rich environments than sMMO producing cells.

== See also ==
- Borg (microbiology)
