= Docking theory of olfaction =

Scientific theory about scent perception

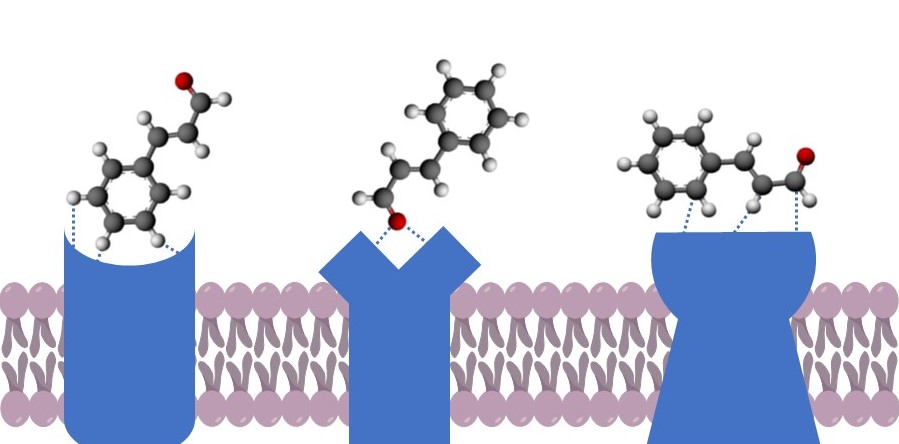
According to the docking theory of olfaction, cinnamaldehyde, a main odorant in cinnamon, would have weak, non-covalent interactions with several different olfactory receptors (symbolized by the shapes in blue).

The docking theory of olfaction proposes that the smell of an odorant molecule is due to a range of weak non-covalent interactions between the odorant [a ligand] and one or more G protein-coupled odorant receptors (found in the nasal epithelium). These include intermolecular forces, such as dipole-dipole and Van der Waals interactions, as well as hydrogen bonding. More specific proposed interactions include metal-ion, ion-ion, cation-pi and pi-stacking. Interactions can be influenced by the hydrophobic effect. Conformational changes can also have a significant impact on interactions with receptors, as ligands have been shown to interact with ligands without being in their conformation of lowest energy.

While this theory of odorant recognition has previously been described as the shape theory of olfaction, which primarily considers molecular shape and size, this earlier model is oversimplified, since two odorants may have similar shapes and sizes but are subject to different intermolecular forces and therefore activate different combinations of odorant receptors, allowing them to be distinguished as different smells by the brain. Other names for the model, such as "lock and key" and "hand in glove", are also misnomers: there are only 396 unique olfactory receptors and too many distinguishable smells for a one-to-one correlation between an odorant and a receptor.

In a seminal paper published in 2023 in Nature which is consistent with the above description of the docking theory, Billesbølle and coworkers use cryo-electron microscopy to determine for the first time the structure of a human OR activated by an odorant, namely OR51E2 activated by propionate. The authors indicate that "propionate binds in a small cavity in OR51E2 that is completely occluded from the external solvent. It binds through two types of contact — specific ionic and hydrogen bonds, and non-specific hydrophobic contacts." Because of the specific shape of the binding pocket, OR51E2 is said to be specific for propionate and "does not bind to fatty acids with longer carbon chains."

The docking theory of olfaction previously relied on the known properties of other G-protein-coupled receptors that have been crystallized, as well as structural predictions given the known primary structure, to produce a likely olfactory receptor model. Though olfactory receptors are similar to other G-protein-coupled receptors, there are notable differences in the primary structure that make exact comparisons unfeasible. Because of this, predicted olfactory receptor structures have been aided by the development of new structure-predicting software. From this data, simpler odorant-receptor binding models have been developed into more nuanced ideas which consider the distortion of flexible molecules so as to form optimal interactions with binding partners. These modifications help the model to conform better to what is known of the molecular docking of non-olfactory G-protein coupled receptors.

== History ==
In 1949, R.W. Moncrieff published an article in American Perfumer called "What is odor: a new theory," which used Linus Pauling's notion of shape-based molecular interactions to propose a shape-based theory of odor. This superseded the older vibration theory of olfaction, and, renamed the docking theory of olfaction to more accurately reflect a range of non-covalent interactions in addition to shape, remains the mainstream theory, in both commercial fragrance chemistry and academic molecular biology. Three years after Moncrieff proposed the theory, John Amoore speculated further that the over ten thousand smells distinguishable by the human olfaction system resulted from the combination of seven basic primary odors correlating to odor receptors for each, much as the spectrum of perceived colors in visible light is generated by the activation of three primary color receptors. Amoore's seven primary odors included sweaty, spermous, fishy, malty, urinous and musky. His most convincing work was done on the camphoraceous odor, for which he posited a hemispherical socket in which spherical molecules, such as camphor, cyclooctane, and naphthalene could bind.

When Linda Buck and Richard Axel published their Nobel Prize winning research on the olfactory receptors in 1991, they identified in mice 1,000 G-protein-coupled receptors used for olfaction. Since all types of G-protein receptors currently known are activated through binding (docking) of molecules with highly specific conformations (shapes) and non-covalent interactions, it is assumed that olfactory receptors operate in a similar fashion. Further research on human olfaction systems identified 347 olfactory receptors.

A recent version of the previously named shape theory, also known as odotope theory or Weak Shape Theory, holds that a combination of activated receptors is responsible for any one smell, as opposed to the older model of one receptor, one shape, one smell. Receptors in the odotope model recognize only small structural features on each molecule, and the brain is responsible for processing the combined signal into an interpreted smell. Much current work on the docking theory focuses on neural processing, rather than the specific interaction between odorant and receptor that generates the original signal.

== Support ==
The 2023 cryo-electron microscopy structural study of the binding of propionate to human olfactory receptor OR51E2 published in Nature is fully consistent with the docking theory of olfaction for the particular odorant and receptor involved.

Numerous studies have been conducted to elucidate the complex relationship between the docking of an odorous molecule and its perceived smell character, and fragrance chemists have proposed structure models for the smells of amber, sandalwood, and camphor, among others.

A study by Leslie B. Vosshall and Andreas Keller, published in Nature Neuroscience in 2004, tested several key predictions of the competing vibration theory and found no experimental support for it. The data were described by Vosshall as "consistent with the shape theory", although she added that "they don't prove the shape theory".

Another study also showed that molecular volume of odorants can determine the upper limits of neural responses of olfactory receptors in Drosophila.

A 2015 Chemical & Engineering News article on the "shape" versus "vibration" debate notes that in the "acrimonious, nearly two-decade-long controversy...on the one side are a majority of sensory scientists who argue that our odorant receptors detect specific scent molecules on the basis of their shapes and chemical properties. On the other side are a handful of scientists who posit that an odorant receptor detects an odor molecule's vibrational frequencies". The article indicates that a new study, led by Block et al., takes aim at the vibrational theory of olfaction, finding no evidence that olfactory receptors distinguish vibrational states of molecules. Specifically, Block et al. report that the human musk-recognizing receptor, OR5AN1, identified using a heterologous olfactory receptor expression system and robustly responding to cyclopentadecanone and muscone, fails to distinguish isotopomers of these compounds in vitro. Furthermore, the mouse (methylthio)methanethiol-recognizing receptor, MOR244-3, as well as other selected human and mouse olfactory receptors, responded similarly to normal, deuterated, and carbon-13 isotopomers of their respective ligands, paralleling results found with the musk receptor OR5AN1. Based on these findings, the authors conclude that the proposed vibration theory does not apply to the human musk receptor OR5AN1, mouse thiol receptor MOR244-3, or other olfactory receptors examined. Additionally, theoretical analysis by the authors shows that the proposed electron transfer mechanism of the vibrational frequencies of odorants could be easily suppressed by quantum effects of nonodorant molecular vibrational modes. The authors conclude: "These and other concerns about electron transfer at olfactory receptors, together with our extensive experimental data, argue against the plausibility of the vibration theory."

In commenting on this work, Vosshall writes "In PNAS, Block et al.... shift the "shape vs. vibration" debate from olfactory psychophysics to the biophysics of the ORs themselves. The authors mount a sophisticated multidisciplinary attack on the central tenets of the vibration theory using synthetic organic chemistry, heterologous expression of olfactory receptors, and theoretical considerations to find no evidence to support the vibration theory of smell." While Turin comments that Block used "cells in a dish rather than within whole organisms" and that "expressing an olfactory receptor in human embryonic kidney cells doesn't adequately reconstitute the complex nature of olfaction..." Vosshall responds "Embryonic kidney cells are not identical to the cells in the nose ... but if you are looking at receptors, it's the best system in the world."

== Challenges ==
- Despite numerous studies, docking theory has yet to discover structure-odor relations with great predictive power.
- Similarly shaped molecules with different molecular vibrations have different smells (metallocene experiment and deuterium replacement of molecular hydrogen). In the metallocene experiment, Turin observes that while ferrocene and nickelocene have nearly the same molecular sandwich structures, they possess distinct odors. He suggests that "because of the change in size and mass, different metal atoms give different frequencies for those vibrations that involve the metal atoms," an observation which is compatible with the vibration theory. However it has been noted that, in contrast to ferrocene, nickelocene rapidly decomposes in air and the cycloalkene odor observed for nickelocene, but not for ferrocene, could simply reflect decomposition of nickelocene giving trace amounts of hydrocarbons such as cyclopentadiene. The challenge regarding smell of molecules with similar structures is contrary to the results obtained with silicon analogues of bourgeonal and lilial, which despite their differences in molecular vibrations have similar smells and similarly activate the most responsive human receptor, hOR17-4, with studies showing that the human musk receptor OR5AN1 responds identically to deuterated and non-deuterated musks and with single-neuron comparison of the olfactory receptor response to deuterated and nondeuterated odorants.
- Differently shaped molecules with similar molecular vibrations have similar smells (replacement of carbon double bonds by sulfur atoms and the disparate shaped amber odorants).
- Hiding functional groups does not hide the group's characteristic odor. However this is not always the case, since ortho-substituted arylisonitriles and thiophenols have far less offensive odors than the parent compounds.
- Very small molecules of similar shape, which seem most likely to be confused by a shape-based system, have extremely distinctive odors, such as hydrogen sulfide. However, it has been suggested that metals such as Cu(I) may be associated with a metallo-receptor site in olfaction for strong-smelling volatiles which are also good metal-coordinating ligands, such as thiol]s. This hypothesis was confirmed in the specific cases of thiol-responsive mouse and human olfactory receptors.
- It is claimed that odor descriptions in the olfaction literature correlate more strongly with their vibrational frequencies than with their molecular shape.

== See also ==
- Odotope theory
- Vibration theory of olfaction
