= Vibration theory of olfaction =

Alternate scientific theory of scent perception

The vibration theory of smell proposes that a molecule's smell character is due to its vibrational frequency in the infrared range. This controversial theory is an alternative to the more widely accepted docking theory of olfaction (formerly termed the shape theory of olfaction), which proposes that a molecule's smell character is due to a range of weak non-covalent interactions between its protein odorant receptor (found in the nasal epithelium), such as electrostatic and Van der Waals interactions as well as H-bonding, dipole attraction, pi-stacking, metal ion, Cation–pi interaction, and hydrophobic effects, in addition to the molecule's conformation.

== Introduction ==
The current vibration theory has recently been called the "swipe card" model, in contrast with "lock and key" models based on shape theory. As proposed by Luca Turin, the odorant molecule must first fit in the receptor's binding site. Then it must have a vibrational energy mode compatible with the difference in energies between two energy levels on the receptor, so electrons can travel through the molecule via inelastic electron tunneling, triggering the signal transduction pathway. The vibration theory is discussed in a popular but controversial book by Chandler Burr.

The odor character is encoded in the ratio of activities of receptors tuned to different vibration frequencies, in the same way that color is encoded in the ratio of activities of cone cell receptors tuned to different frequencies of light. An important difference, though, is that the odorant has to be able to become resident in the receptor for a response to be generated. The time an odorant resides in a receptor depends on how strongly it binds, which in turn determines the strength of the response; the odor intensity is thus governed by a similar mechanism to the "lock and key" model. For a pure vibrational theory, the differing odors of enantiomers, which possess identical vibrations, cannot be explained. However, once the link between receptor response and duration of the residence of the odorant in the receptor is recognised, differences in odor between enantiomers can be understood: molecules with different handedness may spend different amounts of time in a given receptor, and so initiate responses of different intensities.

Seeing as there are some aroma molecules of different shapes that smell the same (eg. benzaldehyde, that gives the same scent to both almonds and/or cyanide), the shape "lock and key" model is not quite sufficient to explain what is going on. Experiments with olfaction, taking quantum mechanics into consideration, suggest that ultimately both theories might work in harmony - first the scent molecules need to fit, as in the docking theory of olfaction model, but then the molecular vibrations of the chemical/atom bonds take over. So in essence your sense of smell could be much more like your sense of hearing, where your nose could be 'listening' to the acoustic/vibrational bonds of aroma molecules.

Some studies support vibration theory while others challenge its findings.

== Major proponents and history ==
The theory was first proposed by Malcolm Dyson in 1928 and expanded by Robert H. Wright in 1954, after which it was largely abandoned in favor of the competing shape theory. A 1996 paper by Luca Turin revived the theory by proposing a mechanism, speculating that the G-protein-coupled receptors discovered by Linda Buck and Richard Axel were actually measuring molecular vibrations using inelastic electron tunneling as Turin claimed, rather than responding to molecular keys fitting molecular locks, working by shape alone. In 2007 a Physical Review Letters paper by Marshall Stoneham and colleagues at University College London and Imperial College London showed that Turin's proposed mechanism was consistent with known physics and coined the expression "swipe card model" to describe it. A PNAS paper in 2011 by Turin, Efthimios Skoulakis, and colleagues at MIT and the Alexander Fleming Biomedical Sciences Research Center reported fly behavioral experiments consistent with a vibrational theory of smell. The theory remains controversial.

== Support ==
=== Isotope effects ===
A major prediction of Turin's theory is the isotope effect: that the normal and deuterated versions of a compound should smell different, although they have the same shape. A 2001 study by Haffenden et al. showed humans able to distinguish benzaldehyde from its deuterated version. However, this study has been criticized for lacking double-blind controls to eliminate bias and because it used an anomalous version of the duo-trio test. In another study, tests with animals have shown fish and insects able to distinguish isotopes by smell.

Deuteration changes the heats of adsorption and the boiling and freezing points of molecules (boiling points: 100.0 °C for H_{2}O vs. 101.42 °C for D_{2}O; melting points: 0.0 °C for H_{2}O, 3.82 °C for D_{2}O), pK_{a} (i.e., dissociation constant: 9.71×10^{−15} for H_{2}O vs. 1.95×10^{−15} for D_{2}O, cf. Heavy water) and the strength of hydrogen bonding. Such isotope effects are exceedingly common, and so it is well known that deuterium substitution will indeed change the binding constants of molecules to protein receptors. Any binding interaction of an odorant molecule with an olfactory receptor will therefore be likely to show some isotope effect upon deuteration, and the observation of an isotope effect in no way argues exclusively for a vibrational theory of olfaction.

A study published in 2011 by Franco, Turin, Mershin and Skoulakis shows both that flies can smell deuterium, and that to flies, a carbon-deuterium bond smells like a nitrile, which has a similar vibration. The study reports that drosophila melanogaster (fruit fly), which is ordinarily attracted to acetophenone, spontaneously dislikes deuterated acetophenone. This dislike increases with the number of deuteriums. (Flies genetically altered to lack smell receptors could not tell the difference.) Flies could also be trained by electric shocks either to avoid the deuterated molecule or to prefer it to the normal one. When these trained flies were then presented with a completely new and unrelated choice of normal vs. deuterated odorants, they avoided or preferred deuterium as with the previous pair. This suggested that flies were able to smell deuterium regardless of the rest of the molecule. To determine whether this deuterium smell was actually due to vibrations of the carbon-deuterium (C-D) bond or to some unforeseen effect of isotopes, the researchers looked to nitriles, which have a similar vibration to the C-D bond. Flies trained to avoid deuterium and asked to choose between a nitrile and its non-nitrile counterpart did avoid the nitrile, lending support to the idea that the flies are smelling vibrations. Further isotope smell studies are under way in fruit flies and dogs.

=== Explaining differences in stereoisomer scents ===
Carvone presented a perplexing situation to vibration theory. Carvone has two isomers, which have identical vibrations, yet one smells like mint and the other like caraway (for which the compound is named).

An experiment by Turin filmed by the 1995 BBC Horizon documentary "A Code in the Nose" consisted of mixing the mint isomer with butanone, on the theory that the shape of the G-protein-coupled receptor prevented the carbonyl group in the mint isomer from being detected by the "biological spectroscope". The experiment succeeded with the trained perfumers used as subjects, who perceived that a mixture of 60% butanone and 40% mint carvone smelled like caraway.

=== The sulfurous smell of boranes ===
According to Turin's original paper in the journal Chemical Senses, the well documented smell of borane compounds is sulfurous, though these molecules contain no sulfur. He proposes to explain this by the similarity in frequency between the vibration of the B-H bond and the S-H bond. However, it has been pointed out that for o-carborane, which has a very strong B−H stretch at 2575 cm^{−1}, the "onion-like odor of crude commercial o-carborane is replaced by a pleasant camphoraceous odor on careful purification, reflecting the method for commercial preparation of o-carborane from reactions promoted by onion-smelling diethyl sulfide, which is removed on purification."

=== Consistency with physics ===
Biophysical simulations published in Physical Review Letters in 2006 suggest that Turin's proposal is viable from a physics standpoint. However, Block et al. in their 2015 paper in Proceedings of the National Academy of Sciences indicate that their theoretical analysis shows that "the proposed electron transfer mechanism of the vibrational frequencies of odorants could be easily suppressed by quantum effects of nonodorant molecular vibrational modes".

=== Correlating odor to vibration ===
A 2004 paper published in the journal Organic Biomolecular Chemistry by Takane and Mitchell shows that odor descriptions in the olfaction literature correlate with EVA descriptors, which loosely correspond to the vibrational spectrum, better than with descriptors based on the two dimensional connectivity of the molecule. The study did not consider molecular shape.

=== Lack of antagonists ===
Turin points out that traditional lock-and-key receptor interactions deal with agonists, which increase the receptor's time spent in the active state, and antagonists, which increase the time spent in the inactive state. In other words, some ligands tend to turn the receptor on and some tend to turn it off. As an argument against the traditional lock-and-key theory of smell, very few olfactory antagonists have been found.

In 2004, a Japanese research group published that an oxidation product of isoeugenol is able to antagonize, or prevent, mice olfactory receptor response to isoeugenol.

=== Additional challenges to the docking theory of olfaction ===
- Similarly shaped molecules with different molecular vibrations have different smells (metallocene experiment and deuterium replacement of molecular hydrogen). However this challenge is contrary to the results obtained with silicon analogues of bourgeonal and lilial, which despite their differences in molecular vibrations have similar smells and similarly activate the most responsive human receptor, hOR17-4, and with studies showing that the human musk receptor OR5AN1 responds identically to deuterated and non-deuterated musks. In the metallocene experiment, Turin observes that while ferrocene and nickelocene have nearly the same molecular sandwich structures, they possess distinct odors. He suggests that "because of the change in size and mass, different metal atoms give different frequencies for those vibrations that involve the metal atoms," an observation which is compatible with the vibration theory. However it has been noted that, in contrast to ferrocene, nickelocene rapidly decomposes in air and the cycloalkene odor observed for nickelocene, but not for ferrocene, could simply reflect decomposition of nickelocene giving trace amounts of hydrocarbons such as cyclopentadiene.
- Differently shaped molecules with similar molecular vibrations have similar smells (replacement of carbon double bonds by sulfur atoms and the disparate shaped amber odorants)
- Hiding functional groups does not hide the group's characteristic odor. However this is not always the case, since ortho-substituted arylisonitriles and thiophenols have far less offensive odors than the parent compounds.

== Challenges ==
Three predictions by Luca Turin on the nature of smell, using concepts of vibration theory, were addressed by experimental tests published in Nature Neuroscience in 2004 by Vosshall and Keller. The study failed to support the prediction that isotopes should smell different, with untrained human subjects unable to distinguish acetophenone from its deuterated counterpart. This study also pointed to experimental design flaws in the earlier study by Haffenden. In addition, Turin's description of the odor of long-chain aldehydes as alternately (1) dominantly waxy and faintly citrus and (2) dominantly citrus and faintly waxy was not supported by tests on untrained subjects, despite anecdotal support from fragrance industry professionals who work regularly with these materials. Vosshall and Keller also presented a mixture of guaiacol and benzaldehyde to subjects, to test Turin's theory that the mixture should smell of vanillin. Vosshall and Keller's data did not support Turin's prediction. However, Vosshall says these tests do not disprove the vibration theory.

In response to the 2011 PNAS study on flies, Vosshall acknowledged that flies could smell isotopes but called the conclusion that smell was based on vibrations an "overinterpretation" and expressed skepticism about using flies to test a mechanism originally ascribed to human receptors. For the theory to be confirmed, Vosshall stated there must be further studies on mammalian receptors. Bill Hansson, an insect olfaction specialist, raised the question of whether deuterium could affect hydrogen bonds between the odorant and receptor.

In 2013, Turin and coworkers confirmed Vosshall and Keller's experiments showing that even trained human subjects were unable to distinguish acetophenone from its deuterated counterpart. At the same time Turin and coworkers reported that human volunteers were able to distinguish cyclopentadecanone from its fully deuterated analog. To account for the different results seen with acetophenone and cyclopentadecanone, Turin and coworkers assert that "there must be many C-H bonds before they are detectable by smell. In contrast to acetophenone which contains only 8 hydrogens, cyclopentadecanone has 28. This results in more than 3 times the number of vibrational modes involving hydrogens than in acetophenone, and this is likely essential for detecting the difference between isotopomers." Turin and coworkers provide no quantum mechanical justification for this latter assertion. Note that the correct term for compounds differing in the number of isotopic substitutions is isotopologue; isotopomers differ only in the position of the substitutions.

Vosshall, in commenting on Turin's work, notes that "the olfactory membranes are loaded with enzymes that can metabolise odorants, changing their chemical identity and perceived odour. Deuterated molecules would be poor substrates for such enzymes, leading to a chemical difference in what the subjects are testing. Ultimately, any attempt to prove the vibrational theory of olfaction should concentrate on actual mechanisms at the level of the receptor, not on indirect psychophysical testing." Richard Axel co-recipient of the 2004 Nobel prize for physiology for his work on olfaction, expresses a similar sentiment, indicating that Turin's work "would not resolve the debate – only a microscopic look at the receptors in the nose would finally show what is at work. Until somebody really sits down and seriously addresses the mechanism and not inferences from the mechanism... it doesn't seem a useful endeavour to use behavioural responses as an argument".

In response to the 2013 paper on cyclopentadecanone, Block et al. report that the human musk-recognizing receptor, OR5AN1, identified using a heterologous olfactory receptor expression system and robustly responding to cyclopentadecanone and muscone (which has 30 hydrogens), fails to distinguish isotopologues of these compounds in vitro. Furthermore, the mouse (methylthio)methanethiol-recognizing receptor, MOR244-3, as well as other selected human and mouse olfactory receptors, responded similarly to normal, deuterated, and carbon-13 isotopologues of their respective ligands, paralleling results found with the musk receptor OR5AN1. Based on these findings, the authors conclude that the proposed vibration theory does not apply to the human musk receptor OR5AN1, mouse thiol receptor MOR244-3, or other olfactory receptors examined. Additionally, theoretical analysis by the authors shows that the proposed electron transfer mechanism of the vibrational frequencies of odorants could be easily suppressed by quantum effects of nonodorant molecular vibrational modes. The authors conclude: "These and other concerns about electron transfer at olfactory receptors, together with our extensive experimental data, argue against the plausibility of the vibration theory."

In commenting on this work, Vosshall writes "In PNAS, Block et al.... shift the "shape vs. vibration" debate from olfactory psychophysics to the biophysics of the ORs themselves. The authors mount a sophisticated multidisciplinary attack on the central tenets of the vibration theory using synthetic organic chemistry, heterologous expression of olfactory receptors, and theoretical considerations to find no evidence to support the vibration theory of smell." While Turin comments that Block used "cells in a dish rather than within whole organisms" and that "expressing an olfactory receptor in human embryonic kidney cells doesn't adequately reconstitute the complex nature of olfaction...", Vosshall responds "Embryonic kidney cells are not identical to the cells in the nose ... but if you are looking at receptors, it's the best system in the world." In a Letter to the Editor of PNAS, Turin et al. raise concerns about Block et al. and Block et al. respond.

Recently, Saberi and Allaei have suggested that a functional relationship exists between molecular volume and the olfactory neural response. The molecular volume is an important factor, but it is not the only factor that determines the response of ORNs. The binding affinity of an odorant-receptor pair is affected by their relative sizes. The maximum affinity can be attained when the molecular volume of an odorant matches the volume of the binding pocket. A recent study describes the responses of primary olfactory neurons in tissue culture to isotopes and finds that a small fraction of the population (<1%) clearly discriminates between isotopes, some even giving an all-or-or -none response to H or D isotopologues of octanal. The authors attribute this to differences in hydrophobicity between normal and deuterated odorants.

== See also ==
- Odotope theory
- Docking theory of olfaction
- Quantum biology
