= Luca Turin =

Italian-Argentinian Bioelectronics and fragrance scientist

- Born: 20 November 1953 (age 72); Beirut, Lebanon
- Education: University College London (PhD 1978)
- Known for: Vibration theory of olfaction
- Awards: Prix Jasmin (France 2001, 2004); Jasmine Prize (UK 2009)
- Scientific career
- Fields: Biophysics
- Workplaces: University College London, CNRS, MIT, University of Ulm, University of Buckingham

Luca Turin (born 20 November 1953) is a biophysicist and writer with a long-standing interest in bioelectronics, the sense of smell, perfumery, and the fragrance industry.

== Early life and education ==
Turin was born in Beirut, Lebanon on 20 November 1953 into an Italian-Argentinian family, and raised in France, Italy and Switzerland. His father, Duccio Turin, was a UN diplomat and chief architect of the Palestinian refugee camps, and his mother, Adela Turin (born Mandelli), is an art historian, designer, and award-winning children's author. Turin studied Physiology and Biophysics at University College London and earned his PhD in 1978. He worked at the CNRS from 1982-1992, and served as lecturer in Biophysics at University College London from 1992-2000.

== Career ==
After leaving the CNRS, Turin first held a visiting research position at the National Institutes of Health in North Carolina before moving back to London, where he became a lecturer in biophysics at University College London. In 2001 Turin was hired as CTO of start-up company Flexitral, based in Chantilly, Virginia, to pursue rational odorant design based on his theories. In April 2010 he described this role in the past tense, and the company's domain name appears to have been surrendered.

In 2010, Turin was based at MIT, working on a project to develop an electronic nose using natural receptors, financed by DARPA. In 2014 he moved to the Institute of Theoretical Physics at the University of Ulm where he was a Visiting Professor. He is a Stavros Niarchos Researcher in the neurobiology division at the Biomedical Sciences Research Center Alexander Fleming in Greece. In 2021 he moved to the University of Buckingham, UK as Professor of Physiology in the Medical School.

=== Vibration theory of olfaction ===
A major prediction of Turin's vibration theory of olfaction is the isotope effect: that the normal and deuterated versions of a compound should smell different due to unique vibration frequencies, despite having the same shape. A 2001 study by Haffenden et al. showed humans able to distinguish benzaldehyde from its deuterated version.

However, experimental tests published in Nature Neuroscience in 2004 by Keller and Vosshall failed to support this prediction, with human subjects unable to distinguish acetophenone and its deuterated counterpart. The study was accompanied by an editorial, which considered the work of Keller and Vosshall to be "refutation of a theory that, while provocative, has almost no credence in scientific circles." It continued, "The only reason for the authors to do the study, or for Nature Neuroscience to publish it, is the extraordinary -- and inappropriate -- degree of publicity that the theory has received from uncritical journalists." The journal also published a review of The Emperor of Scent, calling Chandler Burr's book about Turin and his theory "giddy and overwrought." However, tests with animals have shown fish and insects able to distinguish isotopes by smell. Biophysical simulations published in Physical Review Letters in 2007 suggest that Turin's proposal is viable from a physics standpoint.

The vibration theory received possible support from a 2004 paper published in the journal Organic Biomolecular Chemistry by Takane and Mitchell, which shows that odor descriptions in the olfaction literature correlate more strongly with vibrational frequency than with molecular shape.

In 2011, Turin and colleagues published a paper in PNAS showing drosophila fruit flies can distinguish between odorants and their deuterated counterparts. Tests on drosophila differ from human experiments by using an animal subject known to have a good sense of smell and free from psychological biases that may complicate human tests. Drosophila were trained to avoid the deuterated odorant in a deuterated/normal pair, indicating a difference in odor. Furthermore, drosophila trained to avoid one deuterated odorant also avoided other deuterated odorants, chemically unrelated, indicating that the deuterated bond itself had a distinct smell. The authors identified a vibrational frequency that could be responsible and found it close to one found in nitriles. When flies trained to avoid deuterated odorants were exposed to the nitrile and its non-nitrile counterpart, the flies also avoided the nitrile, consistent with the theory that fly olfaction detects molecular vibrations.

Two years later, in 2013, Turin and colleagues published a study in PLoS ONE showing that humans easily distinguish gas-chromatography-purified deuterated musk in double-blind tests. The team chose musks due to the high number of carbon-hydrogen bonds available for deuteration. They replicated the earlier results of Vosshall and Keller showing that humans cannot reliably distinguish between acetophenone and its deuterated counterpart, with 8 hydrogens, and showed that humans only begin to detect the isotope odor of the musks beginning at 14 deuteriums, or 50% deuteration. Because Turin's proposed mechanism is a biological method of inelastic electron tunnelling spectroscopy, which exploits a quantum effect, his theory of olfaction mechanism has been described as an example of quantum biology.

In response to Turin's 2013 paper, involving deuterated and undeuterated isotopomers of the musk cyclopentadecanone, Block et al. in a 2015 paper in PNAS report that the human musk-recognizing receptor, OR5AN1, identified using a heterologous olfactory receptor expression system and robustly responding to cyclopentadecanone and muscone (which has 30 hydrogens), fails to distinguish isotopomers of these compounds in vitro. Furthermore, the mouse (methylthio)methanethiol-recognizing receptor, MOR244-3, as well as other selected human and mouse olfactory receptors, responded similarly to normal, deuterated, and carbon-13 isotopomers of their respective ligands, paralleling results found with the musk receptor OR5AN1. Based on these findings, the authors conclude that the proposed vibration theory of olfaction does not apply to the human musk receptor OR5AN1, mouse thiol receptor MOR244-3, or other olfactory receptors examined. Additionally, theoretical analysis by the authors shows that the proposed electron transfer mechanism of the vibrational frequencies of odorants could be easily suppressed by quantum effects of nonodorant molecular vibrational modes. The authors conclude: "These and other concerns about electron transfer at olfactory receptors, together with our extensive experimental data, argue against the plausibility of the vibration theory." In commenting on this work, Vosshall writes "In PNAS, Block et al…. shift the "shape vs. vibration" debate from olfactory psychophysics to the biophysics of the ORs themselves. The authors mount a sophisticated multidisciplinary attack on the central tenets of the vibration theory using synthetic organic chemistry, heterologous expression of olfactory receptors, and theoretical considerations to find no evidence to support the vibration theory of smell." While Turin comments that Block used "cells in a dish rather than within whole organisms" and that "expressing an olfactory receptor in human embryonic kidney cells doesn't adequately reconstitute the complex nature of olfaction...", Vosshall responds "Embryonic kidney cells are not identical to the cells in the nose .. but if you are looking at receptors, it's the best system in the world." In a Letter to the Editor of PNAS, Turin et al. raise concerns about Block et al. and Block et al. respond. A recent study describes the responses of primary olfactory neurons in tissue culture to isotopes and finds that a small fraction of the population (<1%) clearly discriminates between isotopes, some even giving an all-or-or -none response to H or D isotopomers of octanal. The authors attribute this to "hypersensitivity" of some receptors to differences in hydrophobicity between normal and deuterated odorants.

=== Biological electronics ===
Turin filed one of the first patents for a semiconductor device made with protein. Turin's recent work focuses on the relevance of his olfaction theory to more general mechanisms of G-protein coupled receptor activation. In an article in Inference Review, he proposed that the electronic mechanism was a special case of a more general involvement of electron currents in GPCRs. A 2019 preprint argues that the highest-resolution x-ray diffraction structure of rhodopsin, considered the ancestor of all GPCRs, contains the elements of an electronic circuit. He has also reported detection of non-equilibrium electron spins in Drosophila by their radiofrequency emissions, though this is described as a "work in progress".

=== Role in the case of Henri Korn ===
In 1988, Turin began work at the lab led by neuroscience researcher Henri Korn at the Pasteur Institute. There, Turin and his colleague Nicole Ropert reported to their superiors that they believed some of Korn's research on neurotransmitters was based on fabricated results. After Turin made a formal request that the CNRS investigate the allegations, he was told to find work outside France; Ropert was also asked to leave.

Korn was awarded the prestigious Richard Lounsbery Award in 1992 and became a member of the National Academy of Sciences in the U.S. and the French Academy of Sciences. Then in 2007, re-analysis of Korn's data by Jacques Ninio in the Journal of Neurophysiology showed serious anomalies that suggested the results were indeed fabricated.

== Publications ==
Turin is the author of the book The Secret of Scent (2006), which details the history and science of his theory of olfaction; an acclaimed critical guide to perfume in French, Parfums: Le Guide, with two editions in 1992 and 1994; and is co-author of the English-language books Perfumes: The A-Z Guide (2008) and The Little Book of Perfumes (2011). He is also the subject of the 2002 book The Emperor of Scent by Chandler Burr and the 1995 BBC Horizons documentary "A Code in the Nose."

Since 2003, Turin has also written a regular column on perfume, "Duftnote," for NZZ Folio, the German-language monthly magazine of Swiss newspaper Neue Zürcher Zeitung. The column is also published in English on the magazine's website. The column ended in 2014. The collected columns are published as a book

== Awards and honors ==
In 2001 and 2004, Turin won the Prix Jasmin, the highest honor for perfume writing in France. He won the Jasmine Prize in the UK in 2009.

== Bibliography ==
- Turin, Luca (1992). Parfums. Le guide (french). Hermé. ISBN 978-2-86665-163-3.
- Turin, Luca (2006). The Secret of Scent: Adventures in Perfume and the Science of Smell. New York: Ecco. ISBN 978-0-06-113383-1.
- Turin, Luca; Tania Sanchez (2008). Perfumes: The Guide - Hardcover. Viking. ISBN 978-0-670-01865-9.
- Turin, Luca; Tania Sanchez (2009). Perfumes: The A-Z Guide - Paperback (new reviews(~450) and new Top 10 lists). Penguin. ISBN 978-0-143-11501-4.
- Turin, Luca; Tania Sanchez (2011). The Little Book of Perfumes: The 100 classics. Profile Books. ISBN 978-1-84668-519-4.
- Turin, Luca (2015). Folio Columns 2003-2014. CreateSpace. ISBN 978-1-5177-5526-3.
- Turin, Luca; Tania Sanchez (2018). Perfumes: The Guide 2018 - Paperback. Perfüümista OÜ. ISBN 978-9949-88-553-4.
- Turin, Luca (2019). Perfumes: Parfums Le guide 1994 (english). Perfüümista OÜ. ISBN 978-9949-01-525-2.
- Turin, Luca; Tania Sanchez (2019). Perfumes: The A-Z Guide - Paperback (reissued). Perfüümista OÜ. ISBN 978-9949-88-967-9.
