= Civet (perfumery) =

Glandular secretion used in perfume

Civet (Zibeth; Zibet; Zibetum), also known as civet musk and civet oil, is the glandular secretion produced by both sexes of Viverridae species.

== Production ==
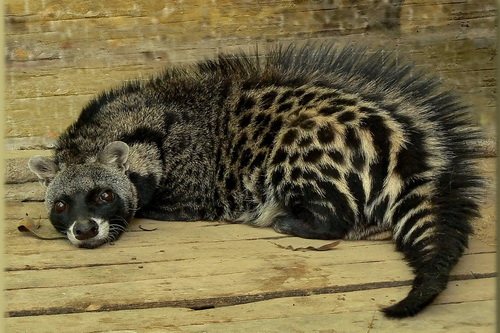
The African civet is one of the species that secretes civet fluid.

A number of viverrid species secrete civet oil in their perineal glands, including the African civet (Civettictis civetta), large Indian civet (Viverra zibetha), and small Indian civet (Viverricula indica). Most civet is produced in African farms, where African civets are kept in cages for this purpose. African civets typically produce three to four grams of civet per week. In 2000, civet sold for about five hundred dollars per kilogram.

Civet is a soft, almost liquid material. It is pale yellow when fresh, darkening in the light and becoming salve-like in consistency. Its odor is strong, even putrid as a pure substance (described as animal, fecal, urine, fatty, waxy), but once diluted it is pleasantly and sweetly aromatic. It is prepared for use in perfumery by solvent extraction to yield either a tincture (10 or 20 percent), an absolute, or a resinoid.

== Composition ==
The chemical in civet oil that gives it most of its distinctive odor is civetone, at a concentration of between 2.5 and 3.4%. The oil also includes various other ketones such as cyclopentadecanone, cyclohexadecanone, cycloheptadecanone, and 6-cis-cycloheptadecenone. The animal scent is reinforced by the presence of smaller amounts of indole and skatole, which in African civet are present at a concentration of about 1%.

== Uses ==
Though historically used in perfumes (in historical versions of such iconic fragrances as Jicky and Mouchoir de Monsieur by Guerlain), civet is often replaced by the easily synthesized 5-cyclohexadecen-1-one (traded as Ambretone).

Civet absolute (CAS# 68916–26–7) is used as a flavor and in perfumery.

== Safety ==
The United States does not allow civets to be imported, as the species can transmit the SARS virus. The US does however permit the importation of civet oil, as long as it has been treated to ensure it is noninfectious.

== Name ==
The name derives from the Arabic زباد zabād or سنور الزباد sinnawr al-zabād, civet cat (Viverra civetta), by way of Old Italian zibetto and Middle French civette and Ethiopian name ዝባድ (Zibad) .

== History ==
The 10th-century Arab historian al-Masudi mentioned civet (zabāda) as a spice in his book Murūdj al-dhahab ('Meadows of Gold').

== See also ==
- Musk
