= C16H30O =

The molecular formula C_{16}H_{30}O (molar mass: 238.41 g/mol, exact mass: 238.2297 u) may refer to:

- Bombykol
- Cyclohexadecanone
- Muscone
