= Asymmetric addition of alkenylmetals to aldehydes =

Asymmetric addition of alkenylmetals to aldehydes

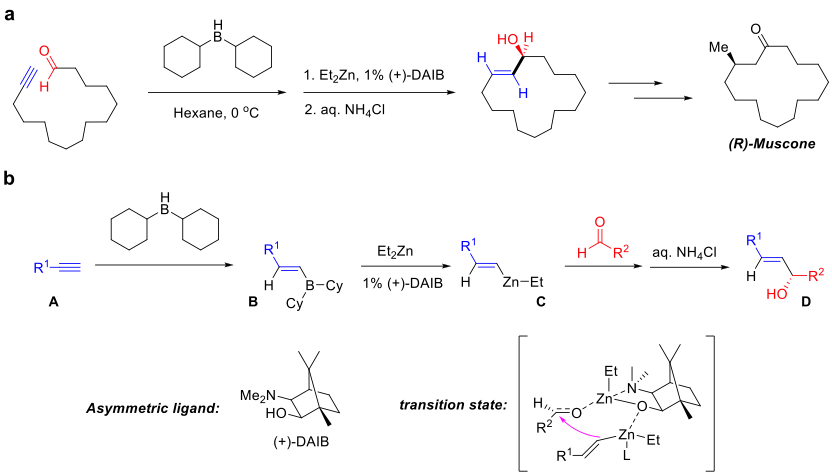
(a) Asymmetric addition of alkenylzinc to aldehyde in the total synthesis of muscone. (b) Detailed steps for the reaction. Structure of the ligand and the proposed transition state for the key addition reaction are shown.

Asymmetric addition of alkenylmetals to aldehydes is a chemical reaction in enantioselective synthesis that reacts an alkenylmetal with an aldehyde to give an allyl alcohol (Figure "Asymmetric addition of alkenylmetals to aldehydes"). The stereoselectivity in the reaction is typically controlled by the asymmetric ligands used providing a strategy to introduce controlled asymmetry into the molecule. Controlled molecular asymmetry (or enantioselectivity) is crucial for controlling the bioactivity of the synthesized molecules and demanded by drug authorities in drug synthesis. In this case the ligands chelate to the transition metal to create a chiral environment which enables the selective formation of a particular enantiomer. Various transition metals such as Zinc, Nickel, Chromium, and Rhodium have been used in this reaction.

Asymmetric addition of alkenylmetals to aldehydes has been widely used in total synthesis of natural product. For example, the key cyclization step in the total synthesis of (R)-(-)-Muscone was an intramolecular asymmetric addition of a vinylzinc derivative to an aldehyde using a chiral amino-isoborneol ligand (Figure "(a) Asymmetric addition of alkenylzinc to aldehyde in the total synthesis of muscone"). The reaction used a terminal alkyne (A) as the substrate which generated alkenylborate reagent (B) through monohydroboration reaction. After transmetalation with diethylzinc, the generated alkenylzinc reagent (C) further reacted with the aldehyde (D) through exclusive addition to the π-face under the control of (-)-3-exo-(dimethylamino)isoborneol (DAIB) as a ligand (Figure "(b) Detailed steps for the reaction").
