= Cyclohexadecanone =

Names
- Preferred IUPAC name Cyclohexadecanone

Identifiers
CAS Number	2550-52-9
3D model (JSmol)	Interactive image
ChemSpider	68213
PubChem CID	75695
CompTox Dashboard (EPA)	DTXSID9062514
- InChI: InChI=1S/C16H30O/c17-16-14-12-10-8-6-4-2-1-3-5-7-9-11-13-15-16/h1-15H2 Key: LXJDKGYSHYYKFJ-UHFFFAOYSA-N
- SMILES: C1CCCCCCCC(=O)CCCCCCC1

Properties
Chemical formula	C_{16}H_{30}O
Molar mass	238.415 g·mol^{−1}
Appearance	white solid
Melting point	66 °C (151 °F; 339 K)
- Except where otherwise noted, data are given for materials in their standard state (at 25 °C [77 °F], 100 kPa). Infobox references

Cyclohexadecanone is an organic compound with the formula (CH_{2})_{15}CO. It is a cyclic ketone, which is a minor component of the musk scent of the civet (described as "powdery, musk, animal"). Several related derivatives are also important in the fragrance industry, especially those with alkene group in the backbone such as civetone, muscone, and 5-cyclohexadecenone (velvione). It is synthesized from 8-cyclohexadecenone.
