= Odotope theory =

Neuropsychological theory

Odotope theory, also known as weak shape theory, is a theory of how olfactory receptors bind to odor molecules. The theory proposes that a combination of shape factors determine the coupling, which utilizes the commonly accepted mechanism of combinatorial receptor codes. In the mechanism, each odorant may activate multiple receptors, and each receptor may respond to multiple odorants. The word itself is an analogy to epitopes.

It falls under the field of structure-odor relations (SOR), and is not to be confused with the docking theory of olfaction, which describes an earlier model of olfaction where one odor molecule would selectively bind to one olfactory receptor.

== Mechanism ==
An odotope describes each molecular and topological feature of an odorant molecule, each of which may be bind to an olfactory receptor(s) that may recognize the particular spatial arrangement. Therefore, an olfactory system would 'deconstruct' odors into its odotopes, and then the pattern of odotopes detected would yield a particular smell.

These receptors are often G-protein-coupled receptors (GPCRs) in mammals. After an odorant dissolves in the nasal mucus, it will bind to the olfactory receptors, which are present on olfactory sensroy neurons. This triggers the activation of olfactory G-protein, stimulating adenylate cyclase and producing cAMP. This in turn opens a cAMP-gated channel for an influx of sodium and calcium ions. As a result, the olfactory sensory neuron gets depolarized, triggering an action potential. This neuronal signal then travels from the olfactory bulb to the olfactory cortex.

In insects, their odorant receptors are known as OrX proteins. These will form heteromeric ligand-gated ion channels with a co-receptor, Orco. Upon odorant binding to the OrX/Orco complex, a non-selective cation channel opens, resulting in calcium, potassium, and sodium passage into the olfactory sensory neuron, triggering depolarization.

== See also ==
- Vibration theory of olfaction
