= C15H28O2 =

The molecular formula C_{15}H_{28}O_{2} (molar mass: 240.387 g/mol, exact mass: 240.2089 u) may refer to:

- Cyclopentadecanolide
- Menthyl isovalerate, or validolum
