= C16H28O =

The molecular formula C_{16}H_{28}O (molar mass: 236.39 g/mol, exact mass: 236.2140 u) may refer to:

- Ambroxide
- Isobornyl cyclohexanol (IBCH)
- 5-Cyclohexadecenone
- Cedramber
- Cetalor
