= Bianca Jones Marlin =

American neuroscientist

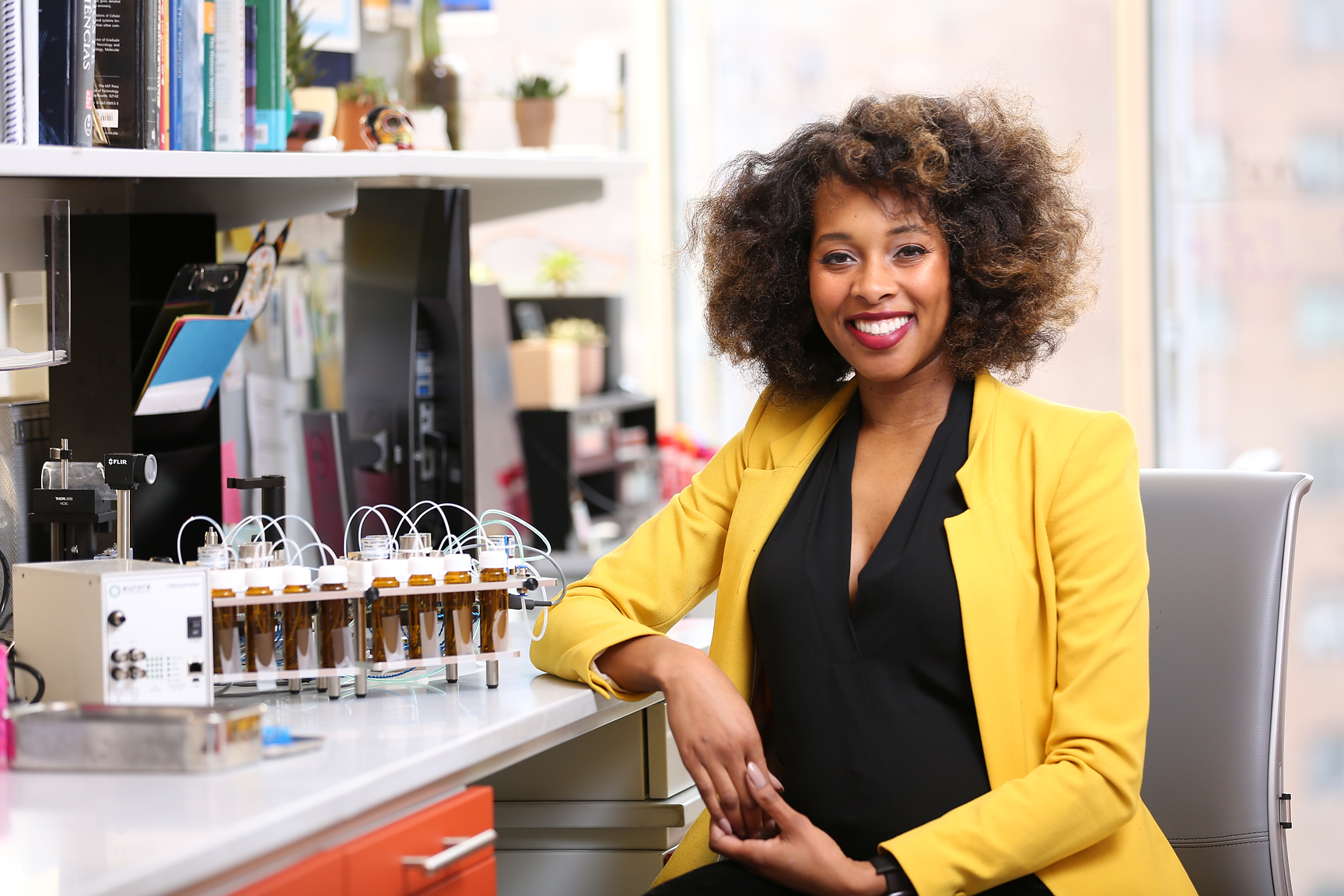
- Born: December 1986 (age 39); New York City, US
- Education: St. John's University (BS); New York University (PhD); Columbia University (postdoctoral fellowship)
- Known for: Role of neuropeptide oxytocin in maternal behavior
- Scientific career
- Fields: Neuroscience
- Workplaces: Zuckerman Institute at Columbia University
- Website: www.biancajonesmarlin.com

Bianca Jones Marlin is an American neuroscientist and the Herbert and Florence Irving Assistant Professor of Cell Research at the Zuckerman Institute at Columbia University in New York City. Marlin studies the epigenetic mechanisms that enable trauma experienced by parents to be passed on to offspring in rodent models. Marlin's graduate work uncovered the fundamental role for the hormone oxytocin in maternal behavior, for which she was awarded the Donald B. Lindsley Prize in Behavioral Neuroscience for Outstanding Ph.D. thesis as well as the STAT Wunderkinds Award for her groundbreaking findings.

== Early life and education ==
Marlin grew up in Central Islip, Long Island with a family structure that influenced her career trajectory. Marlin's biological parents, whom she lived with, were also foster parents. Growing up with both biological and non-biological siblings piqued Marlin's interest in genetics at a very early age. Listening to difficult stories from her non-biological siblings was a driving contributor to her interest in how parental relationships and experiences impact children.

Marlin's high school performance earned her a scholarship to financially support her first semester of college at St. John's University. While at St. John's University, she pursued a dual degree in biology and adolescent education and was actively involved in student leadership and research. As an undergraduate student, Marlin participated in on-campus research and two summer research programs: one at Vanderbilt University and another at the Massachusetts Institute of Technology (MIT). At MIT, Marlin worked under the mentorship of Martha Constantine-Paton and won an award for her research poster at the end of the summer. In 2009, Marlin received a B.S. in biology and a B.S. in Adolescent Education from St. John's University. At graduation, she was honored with the Distinguished Student Leader Award for her service as the President of the student government.

Following graduation, Marlin become a New York State certified teacher and taught at NEST+m, a New York City Department of Education school for gifted and talented students, where she had student taught during her undergraduate years. During her time at NEST+m, she taught seventh and tenth grade science and Advanced Placement (AP) Biology.

== Doctoral research ==
From 2009 to 2015, Marlin pursued her graduate degree at the New York University School of Medicine Graduate Program in Biology and Physiology. Marlin's Ph.D. research explored the role of the hormone oxytocin in maternal behavior and auditory cortex plasticity during critical periods of brain development. In 2011, she published a peer-reviewed article describing the importance of excitatory-inhibitory balance (E-I) in determining the duration of critical period plasticity for auditory cortical frequency tuning— since after birth the auditory cortex is not yet tuned. This work laid the foundation for Marlin to explore how oxytocin shapes social cognition and modifies brain circuits to prompt maternal care toward pups. Rodent mothers (called dams) will retrieve pups when separated from her and/or the litter when triggered by ultrasonic vocalizations emitted from the isolated pups. Typically, dams respond to pup calls, while virgin females do not— suggesting that plasticity in the auditory cortex occurs after the birth of a litter to activate dams to respond. Marlin hypothesized that this plasticity in the auditory cortex was driven by oxytocin because 1) dams release oxytocin following birth to promote bonding, and 2) virgins only respond to pup calls when artificially administered oxytocin. Marlin found that oxytocin sensitized the auditory neural circuits in the auditory cortex and caused long-term changes in the E-I balance. The change in E-I balance accounted for the stable spike-timing precision that is observed in dams (or oxytocin-exposed virgins), but not virgins, when responding to pup calls.

Following Marlin's discoveries regarding the role of oxytocin in pup retrieval, she conducted additional work with colleagues in the Robert Froemke Lab exploring oxytocin's biological role in the social transmission of maternal behavior. In their study, published in Nature, they show that oxytocin neurons in the brain region responsible for the release of oxytocin, the paraventricular nucleus (PVN), are activated by social interaction and that these neurons gate cortical plasticity in response to pup calls. They also show that virgins who are co-housed with experienced mothers, and who visually observed maternal pup retrieval, have increased activation of oxytocin neurons in the PVN and exhibit alloparenting behaviors— suggesting that maternal behavior can be acquired through social transmission.

Marlin's graduate discoveries not only show functional lateralization of the mammalian brain, but also a dedicated, oxytocin-dependent neural circuit for maternal behaviors and adaption following birth. This line of research was highlighted in popular media including National Geographic, the Los Angeles Times, Science Magazine, and Discover Magazine's Top 100 Stories of 2015.

== Postdoctoral research ==
From 2016 to 2020, Marlin was a Postdoctoral Research Fellow at Columbia University under the mentorship of Nobel Laureate Richard Axel. In Axel's lab, Marlin explored how trauma experienced by parents is passed to subsequent generations (i.e., transgenerationally) through epigenetic mechanisms. Marlin and team paired odor cues with a shock in adult mice, and then subsequently studied the neural and behavioral changes in offspring, who had never experienced the shock-odor pairing. Marlin's work on this subject has been featured in popular media including Science Friday and The Washington Post.

== Faculty research ==
In 2020, Marlin joined the faculty at Columbia University in the departments of Psychology and Neuroscience. The Marlin Lab at the Zuckerman Institute continues to explore how organisms unlock innate behaviors at appropriate times, and how learned information is passed to subsequent generations via transgenerational epigenetic inheritance using a combination of neural imaging, behavior, and molecular genetics.

== Awards and honors ==
- 2021 Popular Science Magazine's "The Brilliant 10"
- 2021 The Scientist "Scientists to Watch"
- 2020 Allen Institute Next Generation Leaders
- 2017 STAT Wunderkind Award
- 2016 Donald B. Lindsley Prize in Behavioral Neuroscience, Society for Neuroscience
- 2016 Sackler Outstanding Dissertation Prize
- 2015 Discover Magazine's Top 100 Stories

== Selected press ==
- American Museum of Natural History – SciCafe "The Science of Love with Bianca Jones Marlin"
- Science Friday Podcast "Animal Moms: From Lion to Mouse"
- The Story Collider – featured speaker "Pregnancy: Stories about the science of having a baby" and "It's Because She's Black"
- Featured in National Geographic – "Is Maternal Instinct Only for Moms? Here's the Science," "Great Energy Challenge," and "Oxytocin Makes New Mouse Mothers Focus on Cries of Lost Pups"
- Featured in the Discovery Magazine – "How Oxytocin Changes Behavior"
- Los Angeles Times – "Hormone Oxytocin Jump Starts Maternal Behavior"
- NIH Directors Blog – Lab TV: Curious About a Mother's Bond
- Science Friday – Featured scientist as part of the Breakthrough: Portraits Of Women In Science - "Breakthrough: The Trauma Tracer"
- Neuron - Bianca Jones Marlin Q&A
- The Washington Post - Why understanding inherited trauma is critical, and what it means for our kids

== Publications ==
- Oxytocin neurons enable social transmission of maternal behaviors. Carcea I., Caraballo N.L., Marlin B.J., Ooyama R., Riceberg J.S., Mendoza Navarro J.M., Opendak M., Diaz V.E., Schuster L., Alvarado Torres M.I., Lethin H., Ramos D., Minder J., Mendoza S.L., Bair-Marshall C.J., Samadjopoulos G.H., Hidema S., Falkner A., Lin D., Mar A., Wadghiri Y.Z., Nishimori K., Kikusui T., Mogi K., Sullivan R.M. Froemke R.C. Nature. 2021 Aug 26. 596(7873):553-557. doi: https://doi.org/10.1038/s41586-021-03814-7.
- The Next 50 Years of Neuroscience. Altimus CM, Marlin BJ, Charalambakis NE, Colón-Rodriquez A, Glover EJ, Izbicki P, Johnson A, Lourenco MV, Makinson RA, McQuail J, Obeso I, Padilla-Coreano N, Wells MF; for Training Advisory Committee. J Neurosci. 2020 Jan 2;40(1):101-106. doi: 10.1523/JNEUROSCI.0744-19.2019. PMID 31896564
- Oxytocin modulation of neural circuits for social behavior. Marlin BJ, Froemke RC. Dev Neurobiol. 2017 Feb;77(2):169-189. doi: 10.1002/dneu.22452. Epub 2016 Oct 4. Review.PMID 27626613
- A Distributed Network for Social Cognition Enriched for Oxytocin Receptors. Mitre M, Marlin BJ, Schiavo JK, Morina E, Norden SE, Hackett TA, Aoki CJ, Chao MV, Froemke RC. J Neurosci. 2016 Feb 24;36(8):2517-35. doi: 10.1523/JNEUROSCI.2409-15.2016. PMID 26911697
- Oxytocin enables maternal behaviour by balancing cortical inhibition. Marlin BJ, Mitre M, D'amour JA, Chao MV, Froemke RC. Nature. 2015 Apr 23;520(7548):499-504. doi: 10.1038/nature14402. Epub 2015 Apr 15. PMID 25874674
- The scientist's summer reading list. Science. Haupt R., Langis-Barsetti D., & O'Dwyer R., Preuss M., van Driel M., Margolis E., Jain M., Marlin B.J. 7 Jun 2019. 364. 926–93. doi: https://www.science.org/doi/10.1126/science.aax9532
