= OR5AN1 =

Protein-coding gene in the species Homo sapiens

Identifiers
- Aliases: OR5AN1, OR11-244, olfactory receptor family 5 subfamily AN member 1
- External IDs: OMIM: 615702; MGI: 3031268; GeneCards: OR5AN1

Gene location (Human)
Chr.	Chromosome 11 (human)
Band	11q12.1	Start	59,358,895 bp
Band	11q12.1	End	59,371,714 bp

Gene location (Mouse)
Chr.	Chromosome 19 (mouse)
Band	19|19 A	Start	12,257,218 bp
Band	19|19 A	End	12,262,990 bp
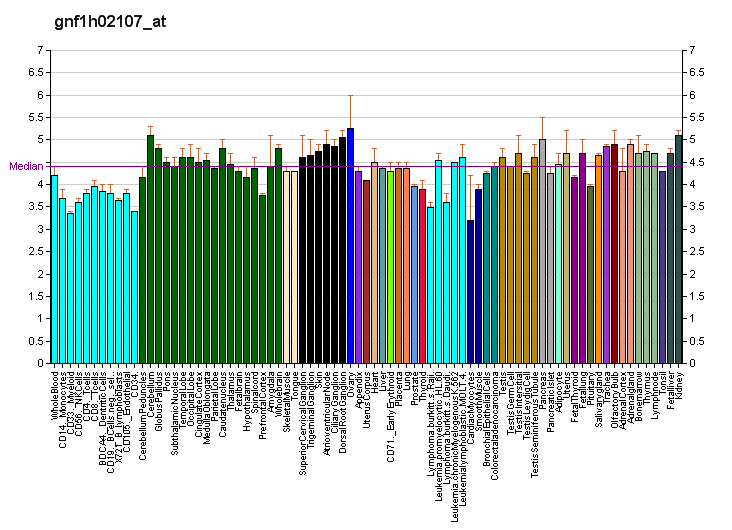
RNA expression pattern
Bgee	Human / Mouse (ortholog); Top expressed in: testicle; gonad / n/a; More reference expression data
BioGPS	More reference expression data
Gene ontology
Molecular function	G protein-coupled receptor activity; odorant binding; olfactory receptor activity; signal transducer activity
Cellular component	integral component of membrane; plasma membrane; membrane
Biological process	sensory perception of smell; signal transduction; response to stimulus; detection of chemical stimulus involved in sensory perception of smell; G protein-coupled receptor signaling pathway; detection of chemical stimulus involved in sensory perception
Sources:Amigo / QuickGO
Orthologs
Databases	NCBI: entry; OMA: entry
Species	Human	Mouse
Entrez	390195	258680
Ensembl	ENSG00000176495	ENSMUSG00000095640
UniProt	Q8NGI8	n/a
RefSeq (mRNA)	NM_001004729	NM_146685
RefSeq (protein)	NP_001004729	n/a
Location (UCSC)	Chr 11: 59.36 – 59.37 Mb	Chr 19: 12.26 – 12.26 Mb
PubMed search
- Wikidata
View/Edit Human	View/Edit Mouse

Olfactory receptor 5AN1 is a protein that in humans is encoded by the OR5AN1 gene.

Olfactory receptors interact with odorant molecules in the nose, to initiate a neuronal response that triggers the perception of a smell. The olfactory receptor proteins are members of a large family of G-protein-coupled receptors (GPCR) arising from single coding-exon genes. Olfactory receptors share a 7-transmembrane domain structure with many neurotransmitter and hormone receptors and are responsible for the recognition and G protein-mediated transduction of odorant signals. The olfactory receptor gene family is the largest in the genome. The nomenclature assigned to the olfactory receptor genes and proteins for this organism is independent of other organisms.

== Ligands ==
- Civetone
- Muscone

== See also ==
- Olfactory receptor
