= Fixative (perfumery) =

Substance used to increase the duration of scent of perfumes

A fixative is a substance used to equalize the vapor pressures, and thus the volatilities, of the raw materials in a perfume oil, and to increase the perfume's odour tenacity.

In simple words, fixatives increase the time for which the scent of a perfume lasts. They do this by slowing the rate at which the lighter scent molecules evaporate into the air.

Fixatives can be resinoids (e.g. benzoin, labdanum, myrrh, olibanum, storax, tolu balsam), terpenoids (e.g. ambroxide), or polycyclic ketones (e.g. civetone and muscone), which were originally obtained from animals, but are now mostly chemically synthesized because the artificial methods are more economical, more consistent and more ethical (animals need to be killed or kept in captivity to collect the secretions from their perineal glands). Synthetic fixatives include substances of low volatility (e.g. diphenylmethane, dipropylene glycol (DPG), cyclopentadecanolide, ambroxide, benzyl salicylate) and virtually odorless solvents with very low vapor pressures (e.g. benzyl benzoate, diethyl phthalate, triethyl citrate).
