= Roger Brent =

American biologist

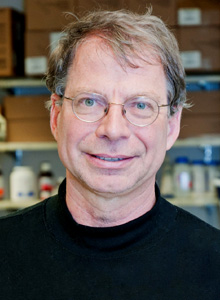
- Brent in his lab at Fred Hutchinson Cancer Research Center, c. 2015
- Born: December 28, 1955 (age 70); Spartanburg, South Carolina, US
- Education: University of Southern Mississippi; Harvard University
- Known for: Domain structure of transcription regulators, systems biology
- Spouse: Linda B. Buck
- Scientific career
- Fields: Biologist
- Workplaces: Harvard University; Molecular Sciences Institute; Fred Hutchinson Cancer Research Center
- Thesis: Regulation of the cellular response to DNA damage (1982)
- Website: https://brentlab.org

Roger Brent (born December 28, 1955) is an American biologist known for his work on gene regulation and systems biology. He studies the quantitative behaviors of cell signaling systems and the origins and consequences of variation in them. He is full member in the Division of Basic Sciences at the Fred Hutchinson Cancer Research Center and an affiliate professor of Genome Sciences at the University of Washington.

== Early life ==
Brent grew up in Hattiesburg, Mississippi, and received his BA in Computer Science and Statistics from the University of Southern Mississippi, where he applied AI techniques to protein folding. He performed PhD (1982) and postdoctoral work (1985) in Biochemistry and Molecular Biology at Harvard University in the laboratory of Mark Ptashne. In work there he cloned the E. coli LexA repressor and showed how it controlled the cell's response to DNA damage, used LexA as a repressor in yeast, and created fusion proteins that used LexA to bring portions of yeast Gal4 and other transcription regulatory proteins to synthetic reporter genes in yeast. These domain swap experiments established the domain structure of eukaryotic transcription regulatory proteins.

== Career ==
Brent's use of prokaryotic repressor proteins in eukaryotes, and development of chimeric proteins containing prokaryotic DNA binding domains, enabled identification of other transcription regulatory domains and gene regulatory technologies including tetracycline-repressor controlled transcriptional repression and the Gal4 and LexA UAS systems used in other model organisms. The use of DNA binding domains to target tethered functional protein domains (for example double strand endonucleases and DNA methylases) or bait moieties in two-hybrid experiments to defined sites on DNA is now routine.

In 1985, Brent moved to the Department of Molecular Biology at Massachusetts General Hospital and the Department of Genetics at Harvard Medical School. His work there contributed to two-hybrid methods and to development of large scale/ general purpose functional genomic means (interaction mating and development of peptide aptamers) to detect and disrupt protein-protein interactions. In 1997, with Sydney Brenner he helped establish the Molecular Sciences Institute, a nonprofit research laboratory in Berkeley, California, and became its CEO, research director and president in 2001. He initiated his lab's studies on cell signal control and cell-to-cell variation there. He is now a Professor of Basic Sciences at the Fred Hutchinson Cancer Center and an Affiliate Professor of Genome Sciences and Bioengineering at the University of Washington.

Brent's work pursues two main questions: how cell signaling systems control their signals and the information those transmit and the origins and phenotypic consequences of cell-to-cell variation in signaling and subsequent responses.

In 1987, Brent helped found, and continues to contribute to, Current Protocols in Molecular Biology, a "how to clone it manual" which started the Current Protocols journals. From 1995 to 2000 he organized the "After the Genome" workshops in Santa Fe, whose content contributed to some of the early systems biology agenda. In addition to customary advisory work with NIH, NSF, and industrial organizations, in 1997 he began to advise the US government on tactical and strategic considerations for defense against biological attack and emerging diseases. In 1998, at the Molecular Sciences Institute, he participated in discussions with Rob Carlson and Drew Endy that helped develop some of the ideas underpinning synthetic biology. From 2011 to 2014 he directed the Center for Biological Futures, an experimental effort to better understand the impacts of advances in biological knowledge and capability on human affairs.

He has been a scholar of The Pew Charitable Trusts and a senior scholar of the Ellison Medical Foundation. In 2003 he shared the Gabbay Award in Biotechnology and Medicine for his work on protein interaction methods, and in 2011 he was named a Fellow of the American Association for the Advancement of Science "for outstanding contributions in the area of biochemistry, transcription, genomics, and systems biology."

Brent's use of prokaryotic repressor proteins and chimeric proteins to regulate gene expression in eukaryotes was the subject of basic patents (including U.S. patent 4,833,080, Regulation of Eukaryotic Gene Expression, with Mark Ptashne). Dr. Brent is the inventor on 16 additional US patents and four pending US patents.

== Personal ==
In 2006, Brent married biologist and 2004 Nobel Prize in Physiology or Medicine laureate Linda B. Buck.
