= Cyclopentadecanolide =

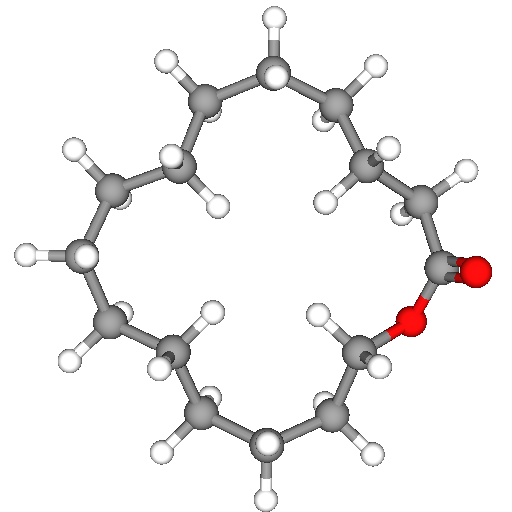

Names
- Preferred IUPAC name 1-Oxacyclohexadecan-2-one
- Other names Angelica lactone; Muskalactone; Muskolactone; Exaltolide; Pentalide; Pentadecanolide; Pentadecalactone; 15-Hydroxypentadecanoic acid, lactone; 15-Hydroxypentadecanoic acid-epsilon-lactone; Pentadecanoic acid, 15-hydroxy-, E-lactone; ω-Pentadecalactone; omega-Pentadecalactone; ω-Lactone; 2-Pentadecalone; Pentadecan-15-olide; 1,15-Pentadecanolide

Identifiers
CAS Number	106-02-5
3D model (JSmol)	Interactive image
ChemSpider	205386
ECHA InfoCard	100.003.050
EC Number	203‐354‐6
PubChem CID	235414
UNII	7BR4HR5Q6M
CompTox Dashboard (EPA)	DTXSID6044359
- InChI: InChI=1S/C15H28O2/c16-15-13-11-9-7-5-3-1-2-4-6-8-10-12-14-17-15/h1-14H2 Key: FKUPPRZPSYCDRS-UHFFFAOYSA-N; InChI=1/C15H28O2/c16-15-13-11-9-7-5-3-1-2-4-6-8-10-12-14-17-15/h1-14H2 Key: FKUPPRZPSYCDRS-UHFFFAOYAJ
- SMILES: O=C1CCCCCCCCCCCCCCO1

Properties
Chemical formula	C_{15}H_{28}O_{2}
Molar mass	240.387 g·mol^{−1}
Appearance	Colorless crystals
Odor	Musklike
Density	0.940
Melting point	34 °C (93 °F; 307 K)
Boiling point	98 °C (208 °F; 371 K) at 0.02 Torr
- Except where otherwise noted, data are given for materials in their standard state (at 25 °C [77 °F], 100 kPa). Infobox references

Cyclopentadecanolide is an organic compound with the formula (CH_{2})_{14}CO_{2}. A colorless solid, it is classified as macrolide lactone. It has some use in perfumery.

== Occurrence and production ==
Cyclopentadecanolide occurs in small quantities in angelica root essential oil and is responsible for its musklike odor.

Cyclopentadecanolide is produced by ring expansion of cyclotetradecanone. Another synthesis route is the depolymerization of polyesters of 15-hydroxypentadecanoic acid.

== Uses ==
Cyclopentadecanolide is used as a musklike perfume fixative in fine fragrances and as a flavoring agent. Its aroma is described as "musk, animal, powdery, natural, fruity, tobacco, coumarinic, heliotrope, and licorice". It is a substitute for the extremely expensive animal musk.
