= 5-Cyclohexadecenone =

cis-5-cyclohexadecenone
trans-5-cyclohexadecenone

Names
- Preferred IUPAC name Cyclohexadec-5-en-1-one
- Other names 5-Cyclohexadecen-1-one; Velvione; musk amberol; Ambrettone; musk TM-II

Identifiers
| CAS Number | 37609-25-9 |
| 3D model (JSmol) | Interactive image |
| ChEMBL | ChEMBL3188464 |
| ChemSpider | 26547690 |
| ECHA InfoCard | 100.048.681 |
| EC Number | 253-568-9 |
| PubChem CID | 162268 |
| UNII | 1DAH7E9E0D |
| CompTox Dashboard (EPA) | DTXSID8047139 |
- InChI: InChI=1S/C16H28O/c17-16-14-12-10-8-6-4-2-1-3-5-7-9-11-13-15-16/h6,8H,1-5,7,9-15H2 Key: ABRIMXGLNHCLIP-UHFFFAOYSA-N
- SMILES: C1CCCCCC(=O)CCCC=CCCCC1

Properties
| Chemical formula | C_{16}H_{28}O |
| Molar mass | 236.399 g·mol^{−1} |
| Appearance | Colorless clear liquid |
- Except where otherwise noted, data are given for materials in their standard state (at 25 °C [77 °F], 100 kPa). Infobox references

5-Cyclohexadecenone is a macrocyclic synthetic musk with the chemical formula C_{16}H_{28}O. It is an unsaturated analog of cyclohexadecanone. It is also similar in chemical structure to the natural musk scents civetone and muscone.

5-Cyclohexadecenone has a strong musk scent with floral, amber, and civet tones. It is used as a substitute for natural musk in perfumes, cosmetics, and soaps. Trade names include Ambretone, Velvione, and TM-II.

5-Cyclohexadecenone can exist as either of two cis/trans isomers and the commercial product is typically a mixture of the two. It can be synthesized in a four-step sequence from cyclododecanone.
