= Resinoid (perfumery) =

Resinoids are extracts of resinous plant exudates (balsams, oleo gum resins, and natural oleoresins). They are mainly used as perfume fixatives.
