= OR51E2 =

Protein-coding gene in the species Homo sapiens

Identifiers
- Aliases: OR51E2, OR51E3P, OR52A2, PSGR, olfactory receptor family 51 subfamily E member 2, HPRAJ
- External IDs: OMIM: 611268; MGI: 2157548; GeneCards: OR51E2

Gene location (Human)
Chr.	Chromosome 11 (human)
Band	11p15.4	Start	4,680,171 bp
Band	11p15.4	End	4,697,854 bp

Gene location (Mouse)
Chr.	Chromosome 7 (mouse)
Band	7|7 E3	Start	102,387,718 bp
Band	7|7 E3	End	102,408,678 bp
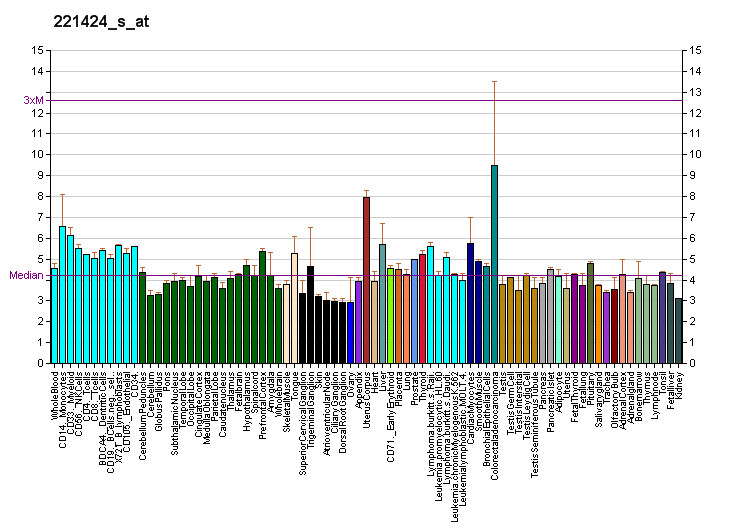
RNA expression pattern
Bgee	Human / Mouse (ortholog); Top expressed in: retinal pigment epithelium; popliteal artery; tibial arteries; prostate; muscle layer of sigmoid colon; right coronary artery; smooth muscle tissue; transverse colon; rectum; left coronary artery / Top expressed in: umbilical cord; carotid body; lumbar subsegment of spinal cord; muscle of thigh; trigeminal ganglion; digastric muscle; extraocular muscle; temporal muscle; triceps brachii muscle; respiratory epithelium; More reference expression data
BioGPS	More reference expression data
Gene ontology
Molecular function	signal transducer activity; olfactory receptor activity; G protein-coupled receptor activity; steroid hormone receptor activity; signaling receptor activity
Cellular component	membrane; integral component of membrane; plasma membrane; early endosome membrane; intracellular organelle; endosome
Biological process	sensory perception of smell; steroid hormone mediated signaling pathway; signal transduction; response to stimulus; detection of chemical stimulus involved in sensory perception of smell; positive regulation of blood pressure; cellular response to fatty acid; positive regulation of renin secretion into blood stream; G protein-coupled receptor signaling pathway; cell migration; melanocyte differentiation; positive regulation of cAMP-mediated signaling; melanocyte proliferation
Sources:Amigo / QuickGO
Orthologs
Databases	NCBI: entry; OMA: entry
Species	Human	Mouse
Entrez	81285	170639
Ensembl	ENSG00000167332	ENSMUSG00000043366
UniProt	Q9H255	Q8VBV9
RefSeq (mRNA)	NM_030774	NM_001168503; NM_130866
RefSeq (protein)	NP_110401	NP_001161975; NP_570936
Location (UCSC)	Chr 11: 4.68 – 4.7 Mb	Chr 7: 102.39 – 102.41 Mb
PubMed search
- Wikidata
View/Edit Human	View/Edit Mouse

Olfactory receptor 51E2 is a protein that in humans is encoded by the OR51E2 gene.

Olfactory receptors interact with odorant molecules in the nose, to initiate a neuronal response that triggers the perception of a smell. The olfactory receptor proteins are members of a large family of G-protein-coupled receptors (GPCR) arising from single coding-exon genes. Olfactory receptors share a 7-transmembrane domain structure with many neurotransmitter and hormone receptors and are responsible for the recognition and G protein-mediated transduction of odorant signals. The olfactory receptor gene family is the largest in the genome. The nomenclature assigned to the olfactory receptor genes and proteins for this organism is independent of other organisms.

== Structure ==
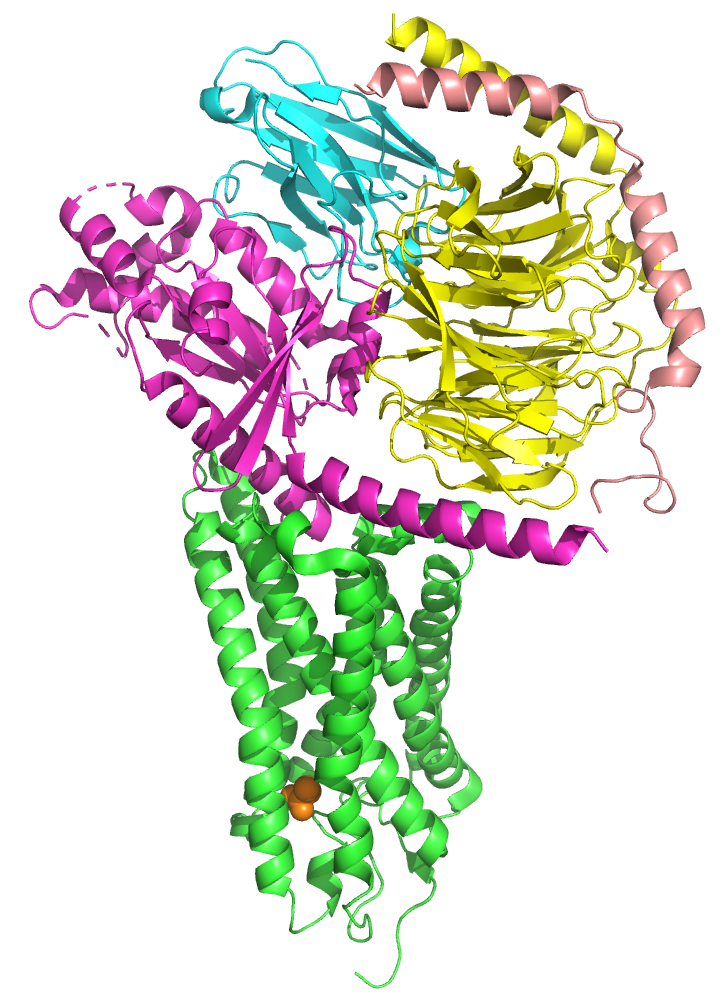
Structure of the olfactory receptor OR51E2 (green) complexed with miniGs399 and a propionic acid ligand (orange).

Its structure was determined in 2023, the first elucidation of the structure of a human olfactory receptor.

== Ligands ==
OR51E2 is a relatively narrowly tuned olfactory receptor, meaning it responds only to a relatively small set of related odorants.

OR51E2 responds to short-chain fatty acids, including in particular propionic acid.

== See also ==
- Olfactory receptor
