= GPR148 =

Protein-coding gene in the species Homo sapiens

Identifiers
- Aliases: GPR148, BTR, PGR6, G protein-coupled receptor 148
- External IDs: GeneCards: GPR148

Gene location (Human)
Chr.	Chromosome 2 (human)
Band	2q21.1	Start	130,729,070 bp
Band	2q21.1	End	130,730,336 bp
RNA expression pattern
Bgee	Human / Mouse (ortholog); Top expressed in: islet of Langerhans; cerebellum; cerebellar hemisphere; right hemisphere of cerebellum; pituitary gland; anterior pituitary; primary visual cortex; Brodmann area 9; hypothalamus; rectum / n/a; More reference expression data
BioGPS	n/a
Gene ontology
Molecular function	G protein-coupled receptor activity; signal transducer activity
Cellular component	integral component of membrane; plasma membrane; membrane
Biological process	G protein-coupled receptor signaling pathway; signal transduction
Sources:Amigo / QuickGO
Orthologs
Databases	NCBI: entry; OMA: entry
Species	Human	Mouse
Entrez	344561	n/a
Ensembl	ENSG00000173302	n/a
UniProt	Q8TDV2	n/a
RefSeq (mRNA)	NM_207364	n/a
RefSeq (protein)	NP_997247	n/a
Location (UCSC)	Chr 2: 130.73 – 130.73 Mb	n/a
PubMed search		n/a
- Wikidata
View/Edit Human

G protein-coupled receptor 148, also known as GPR148, is a human orphan receptor from GPCR superfamily. It is expressed primarily in nervous system and testis. Is may be implicated in prostate cancer.
