= Linda B. Buck =

American biologist

Linda Buck ForMemRS
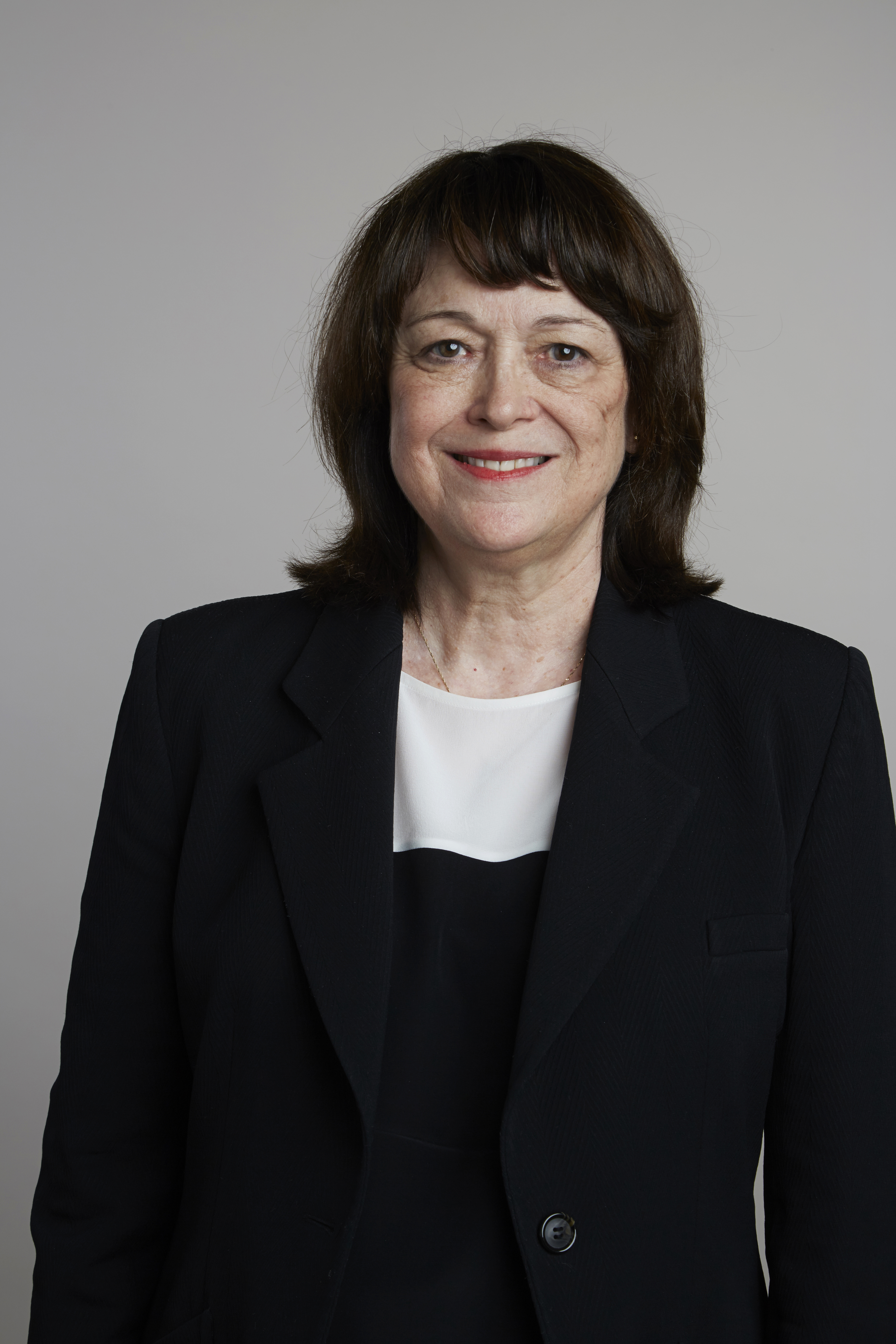
- Buck in 2015
- Born: Linda Brown Buck; January 29, 1947 (age 79); Seattle, Washington, U.S.
- Education: University of Washington (BS); UT Southwestern (Ph.D)
- Known for: Olfactory receptors
- Spouse: Roger Brent
- Awards: Takasago Award (1992); Lewis S. Rosenstiel Award (1996); Perl-UNC Prize (2002); Gairdner Foundation International Award (2003); Nobel Prize in Physiology or Medicine (2004)
- Scientific career
- Fields: Rhinologist
- Workplaces: Fred Hutchinson Cancer Research Center; University of Washington, Seattle; Howard Hughes Medical Institute; Columbia University; Harvard University
- Thesis: The Expression of IgD and Lyb-2 by Murine B Lymphocytes (1980)
- Doctoral advisor: Ellen Vitetta
- Other academic advisors: Benvenuto Pernis Richard Axel
- Website: HHMI bio

Linda Brown Buck (born January 29, 1947) is an American biologist best known for her work on the olfactory system. She was awarded the 2004 Nobel Prize in Physiology or Medicine, along with Richard Axel, for their work on olfactory receptors. She is currently on the faculty of the Fred Hutchinson Cancer Research Center in Seattle.

== Personal life ==
Linda B. Buck was born in Seattle, Washington on January 29, 1947. Her father was an electrical engineer who spent his time inventing and building different items in his spare time, while her mother was a homemaker who spent a majority of her free time solving word puzzles. Buck was the second of three children, all of whom are girls. Her father has Irish ancestry as well as ancestors dating back to the American revolution. Her mother is of Swedish ancestry. In 1994 Buck met Roger Brent, also a biologist. The two married in 2006.

== Education ==
Buck received her B.S. in psychology and microbiology in 1975 from the University of Washington, Seattle. She is the first female University of Washington alumnus to win the Nobel Prize. She was awarded her Ph.D. in immunology in 1980 under the direction of Professor Ellen Vitetta at the University of Texas Southwestern Medical Center at Dallas.

== Career and research ==
In 1980, Buck began postdoctoral research at Columbia University under Benvenuto Pernis (1980–1982). In 1982, she joined the laboratory of Richard Axel, also at Columbia in the Institute of Cancer Research. After reading Sol Snyder's group research paper at Johns Hopkins University, Buck set out to map the olfactory process at the molecular level, tracing the travel of odors through the cells of the nose to the brain. Buck and Axel worked with rat genes in their research and identified a family of genes that code for more than 1000 odor receptors and published these findings in 1991. Later that year, Buck became an assistant professor in the Neurobiology Department at Harvard Medical School where she established her own lab. After finding how odors are detected by the nose, Buck published her findings in 1993 on how the inputs from different odor receptors are organized in the nose. Essentially, her primary research interest is on how pheromones and odors are detected in the nose and interpreted in the brain. She is a Full Member of the Basic Sciences Division at Fred Hutchinson Cancer Research Center, and an Affiliate Professor of Physiology and Biophysics at the University of Washington, Seattle.

== Nobel Prize in Physiology or Medicine (2004) ==
In her landmark paper published in 1991 with Richard Axel, Linda Buck discovered hundreds of genes code for the odorant sensors located in the olfactory neurons of our noses. Each receptor is a protein that changes when an odor attaches to the receptor, causing an electrical signal to be sent to the brain. Differences between odorant sensors mean that certain odors cause a signal to be released from a certain receptor. We are then able to interpret varying signals from our receptors as specific scents. To do this, Buck and Axel cloned olfactory receptors, showing that they belong to the family of G protein-coupled receptors. By analyzing rat DNA, they estimated that there were approximately 1,000 different genes for olfactory receptors in the mammalian genome. This research opened the door to the genetic and molecular analysis of the mechanisms of olfaction. In their later work, Buck and Axel have shown that each olfactory receptor neuron remarkably only expresses one kind of olfactory receptor protein and that the input from all neurons expressing the same receptor is collected by a single dedicated glomerulus of the olfactory bulb.

== Awards and honors ==
Buck was awarded the Takasago Award for Research in Olfaction (1992), Unilever Science Award (1996), R.H. Wright Award in Olfactory Research (1996), Lewis S. Rosenstiel Award for Distinguished Work in Basic Medical Research (1996), Perl/UNC Neuroscience Prize (2002), and Gairdner Foundation International Award (2003). In 2005, she received the Golden Plate Award of the American Academy of Achievement. Buck was inducted into the National Academy of Sciences in 2003 and the Institutes of Medicine in 2006. Buck has been a Fellow of the American Association for the Advancement of Science and the American Academy of Arts and Sciences since 2008. She also sits on the Selection Committee for Life Science and Medicine which chooses winners of the Shaw Prize. In 2015, Buck was awarded an honorary doctorate by Harvard University and elected a Foreign Member of the Royal Society (ForMemRS).

== Retractions ==
Buck retracted 3 papers, published in Nature (pub. 2001, retracted 2008), Science (pub 2006, retracted 2010) and Proceedings of the National Academy of Sciences (pub 2005, retracted 2010) due to falsification/fabrication of results by lead author and collaborator Zhihua Zou.

== See also ==
- Timeline of women in science
