= Olfactory receptor =

Chemoreceptors expressed in cell membranes of olfactory receptor neurons

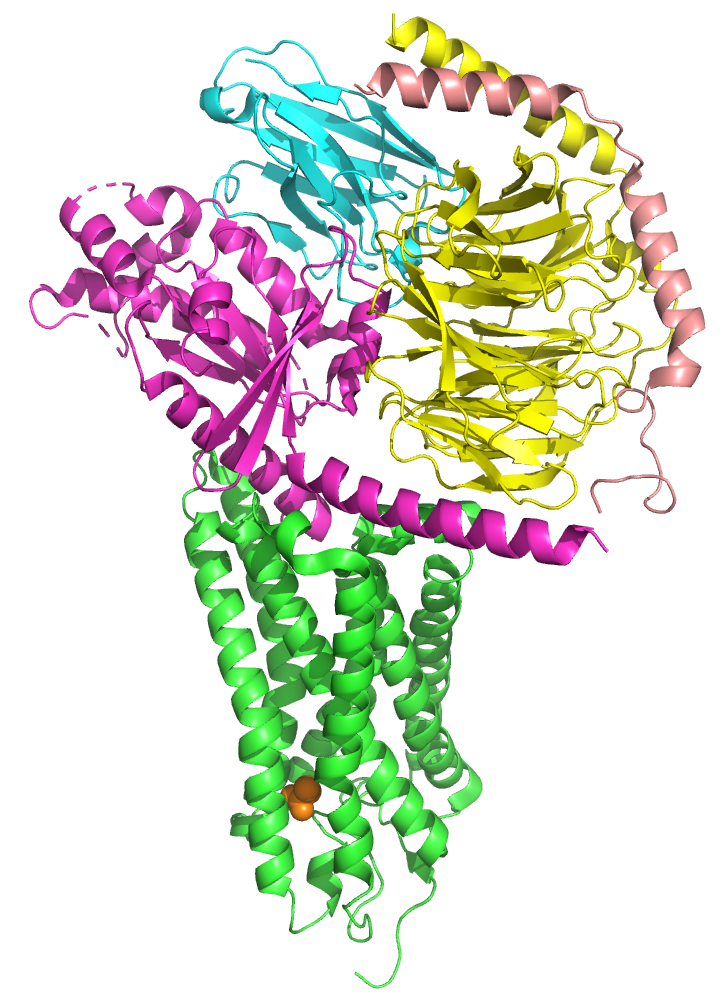
- Ribbon structure of olfactory receptor OR51E2 (green) complexed with miniGs399 and a propionic acid ligand (orange)

Identifiers
- Symbol: 7tm_4
- Pfam: PF13853
- InterPro: IPR000725
Available protein structures:
- PDB: IPR000725 PF13853 (ECOD; PDBsum)
- AlphaFold: IPR000725; PF13853

Olfactory receptors (ORs), also known as odorant receptors, are chemoreceptors expressed in the cell membranes of olfactory receptor neurons and are responsible for the detection of odorants (for example, compounds that have an odor) which give rise to the sense of smell. Activated olfactory receptors trigger nerve impulses which transmit information about odor to the brain.

Vertebrates have a total of four olfactory receptor families: OR, TAAR, V1R/ORA, and V2R/OlfC. This article focuses on the OR family. This consists of members of the rhodopsin-like (class A) G protein-coupled receptors (GPCRs). OR forms the largest multigene family in vertebrates consisting of around 400 genes in humans and 1400 genes in mice.

In insects, olfactory receptors are members of an unrelated group of ligand-gated ion channels.

== Expression ==
In vertebrates, the olfactory receptors are located in both the cilia and synapses of the olfactory sensory neurons and in the epithelium of the human airway. Sperm cells also express odorant receptors, which are thought to be involved in chemotaxis to find the egg cell.

== Mechanism ==
Rather than binding specific ligands, olfactory receptors display affinity for a range of odorant molecules, and conversely a single odorant molecule may bind to a number of olfactory receptors with varying affinities, which depend on physio-chemical properties of molecules like their molecular volumes. Once the odorant has bound to the odorant receptor, the receptor undergoes structural changes and it binds and activates the olfactory-type G protein on the inside of the olfactory receptor neuron. The G protein (G_{olf} and/or G_{s}) in turn activates the lyase – adenylate cyclase – which converts ATP into cyclic AMP (cAMP). The cAMP opens cyclic nucleotide-gated ion channels which allow calcium and sodium ions to enter into the cell, depolarizing the olfactory receptor neuron and beginning an action potential which carries the information to the brain.

=== Metalloprotein–ligand interactions ===
The primary sequences of thousands of olfactory receptors are known from the genomes of more than a dozen organisms: they are seven-helix transmembrane proteins, but there are very few solved structures. Their sequences exhibit typical class A GPCR motifs, useful for building their structures with molecular modeling. Golebiowski, Ma and Matsunami showed that the mechanism of ligand recognition, although similar to other non-olfactory class A GPCRs, involves residues specific to olfactory receptors, notably in the sixth helix. There is a highly conserved sequence in roughly three quarters of all ORs that is a tripodal metal ion binding site, and Suslick has proposed that the ORs are in fact metalloproteins (mostly likely with zinc, copper and possibly manganese ions) that serve as a Lewis acid site for binding of many odorant molecules. Crabtree, in 1978, had previously suggested that Cu(I) is "the most likely candidate for a metallo-receptor site in olfaction" for strong-smelling volatiles which are also good metal-coordinating ligands, such as thiols. Zhuang, Matsunami and Block, in 2012, confirmed the Crabtree/Suslick proposal for the specific case of a mouse OR, MOR244-3, showing that copper is essential for detection of certain thiols and other sulfur-containing compounds. Thus, by using a chemical that binds to copper in the mouse nose, so that copper was not available to the receptors, the authors showed that the mice could not detect the thiols. However, these authors also found that MOR244-3 lacks the specific metal ion binding site suggested by Suslick, instead showing a different motif in the EC2 domain.

Malfunction of the metalloproteins in the olfactory system is hypothesized to have a connection with amyloidal based neurodegenerative diseases.

=== Vibrational theory of olfaction ===
In a recent but highly controversial interpretation, it has also been speculated that olfactory receptors might really sense various vibrational energy-levels of a molecule rather than structural motifs via quantum coherence mechanisms. As evidence it has been shown that flies can differentiate between two odorant molecules which only differ in hydrogen isotope (which will drastically change vibrational energy levels of the molecule). Not only could the flies distinguish between the deuterated and non-deuterated forms of an odorant, they could generalise the property of "deuteratedness" to other novel molecules. In addition, they generalised the learned avoidance behaviour to molecules which were not deuterated but did share a significant vibration stretch with the deuterated molecules, a fact which the differential physics of deuteration (below) has difficulty in accounting for.

Deuteration changes the heats of adsorption and the boiling and freezing points of molecules (boiling points: 100.0 °C for H_{2}O vs. 101.42 °C for D_{2}O; melting points: 0.0 °C for H_{2}O, 3.82 °C for D_{2}O), pKa (i.e., dissociation constant: 9.71 × 10^{−15} for H_{2}O vs. 1.95 × 10^{−15} for D_{2}O, cf. heavy water) and the strength of hydrogen bonding. Such isotope effects are exceedingly common, and so it is well known that deuterium substitution will indeed change the binding constants of molecules to protein receptors.

It has been claimed that human olfactory receptors are capable of distinguishing between deuterated and undeuterated isotopomers of cyclopentadecanone by vibrational energy level sensing. However this claim has been challenged by another report that the human musk-recognizing receptor, OR5AN1 that robustly responds to cyclopentadecanone and muscone, fails to distinguish isotopomers of these compounds in vitro. Furthermore, the mouse (methylthio)methanethiol-recognizing receptor, MOR244-3, as well as other selected human and mouse olfactory receptors, responded similarly to normal, deuterated, and carbon-13 isotopomers of their respective ligands, paralleling results found with the musk receptor OR5AN1. Hence it was concluded that the proposed vibration theory does not apply to the human musk receptor OR5AN1, mouse thiol receptor MOR244-3, or other olfactory receptors examined. In addition, the proposed electron transfer mechanism of the vibrational frequencies of odorants could be easily suppressed by quantum effects of nonodorant molecular vibrational modes. Hence multiple lines of evidence argue against the vibration theory of smell. This later study was criticized since it used "cells in a dish rather than within whole organisms" and that "expressing an olfactory receptor in human embryonic kidney cells doesn't adequately reconstitute the complex nature of olfaction...". In response, the authors of the second study state "Embryonic kidney cells are not identical to the cells in the nose .. but if you are looking at receptors, it's the best system in the world."

== Diversity ==
There are a large number of different odor receptors, with as many as 2,000 in the mammalian genome which, depending on the species represents up to 5% of the coding-genes in the genome. However, not all of these potential odor receptor genes are expressed and functional. According to an analysis of data derived from the Human Genome Project, humans have approximately 400 functional genes coding for olfactory receptors, and the remaining 600 candidates are pseudogenes.

The reason for the large number of different odor receptors is to provide a system for discriminating between as many different odors as possible. Even so, each odor receptor does not detect a single odor. Rather each individual odor receptor is broadly tuned to be activated by a number of similar odorant structures. Analogous to the immune system, the diversity that exists within the olfactory receptor family allows molecules that have never been encountered before to be characterized. However, unlike the immune system, which generates diversity through in-situ recombination, every single olfactory receptor is translated from a specific gene; hence the large portion of the genome devoted to encoding OR genes. Furthermore, most odors activate more than one type of odor receptor. Since the number of combinations and permutations of olfactory receptors is very large, the olfactory receptor system is capable of detecting and distinguishing between a very large number of odorant molecules.

Deorphanization of odor receptors can be completed using electrophysiological and imaging techniques to analyze the response profiles of single sensory neurons to odor repertoires. Such data open the way to the deciphering of the combinatorial code of the perception of smells.

Such diversity of OR expression maximizes the capacity of olfaction. Both monoallelic OR expression in a single neuron and maximal diversity of OR expression in the neuron population are essential for specificity and sensitivity of olfactory sensing. Thus, olfactory receptor activation is a dual-objective design problem. Using mathematical modeling and computer simulations, Tian et al proposed an evolutionarily optimized three-layer regulation mechanism, which includes zonal segregation, epigenetic barrier crossing coupled to a negative feedback loop and an enhancer competition step. This model not only recapitulates monoallelic OR expression but also elucidates how the olfactory system maximizes and maintains the diversity of OR expression.

== Families ==
- - 1
    - A
    - - B
      - - C
        - - δ delta
          - - - α alpha
              - β beta
            - - ζ zeta
              - - γ gamma
                - ε epsilon
  - 2
    - λ lambda
    - - η eta
      - - θ theta
        - κ kappa
- Non-OR GPCRs

Subclades of vertebrate ORs, Policarpo Supp. Fig. 13.

Vertebrate-wide, the ORs are divided into 13 subclades. The non-Greek-lettered clades are more limited in distribution: A is restricted to the jawless fish; B to the jawless fish, the Australian ghostshark and the coelacanth; and C to the jawless fish and the ghostshark. The branches labelled "1" and "2" correspond to the two "types" defined by Niimura (2009). Amphioxus have "type 2" ORs. Some groups are less prone to gene duplication than others, suggesting that they may play a non-olfactory role.

Tetrapods generally only have the alpha, beta, and gamma subclades, with gamma being the overwhelming majority. An outdated classification of tetrapod (human and frog) ORs included:

- class I "fish-like" – hydrophilic odorants
- class II "tetrapod-specific" – more hydrophobic compounds

In the current scheme, class I corresponds to alpha and beta while class II corresponds to gamma. Gamma is not actually tetrapod specific: it's just present in many more copies in tetrapods.

=== Human ===
A nomenclature system has been devised for the olfactory receptor family and is the basis for the official Human Genome Project (HUGO) symbols for the genes that encode these receptors. The names of individual olfactory receptor family members are in the format "ORnXm" where:

- OR is the root name (Olfactory Receptor superfamily)
- n = an integer representing a family (e.g., 1-56) whose members have greater than 40% sequence identity,
- X = a single letter (A, B, C, ...) denoting a subfamily (>60% sequence identity), and
- m = an integer representing an individual family member ("isoform", in the sense of a paralog).

For example, OR1A1 in the first isoform of subfamily A of olfactory receptor family 1.

Members belonging to the same subfamily of olfactory receptors (>60% sequence identity) are likely to recognize structurally similar odorant molecules.

In the HUGO scheme, families 1–14 are assigned to gamma ORs and families 51–56 are assigned to alpha and beta ORs (beta is only present as a pseudogene).

The HUGO scheme only covers type 1 ORs. The type 2 OR-family proteins found in humans include GPR148 of the theta-1 subclade and a pseudogene of the kappa family.

== Evolution ==
The OR gene family in vertebrates has been shown to evolve through many gene duplications and gene losses, evolutionary dynamics known as a "birth-and-death" process. Evidence of a role for tandem duplication is provided by the fact that many OR genes belonging to the same phylogenetic clade are located in the same gene cluster. To this point, the organization of OR genomic clusters is well conserved between humans and mice, even though the functional OR count is vastly different between these two species. Such birth-and-death evolution has brought together segments from several OR genes to generate and degenerate odorant binding site configurations, creating new functional OR genes as well as pseudogenes.

Compared to many other mammals, primates have a relatively small number of functional OR genes. For instance, since divergence from their most recent common ancestor (MRCA), mice have gained a total of 623 new OR genes, and lost 285 genes, whereas humans have gained only 83 genes, but lost 428 genes. Mice have a total of 1035 protein-coding OR genes, humans have 387 protein-coding OR genes. The vision priority hypothesis states that the evolution of color vision in primates may have decreased primate reliance on olfaction, which explains the relaxation of selective pressure that accounts for the accumulation of olfactory receptor pseudogenes in primates. However, recent evidence has rendered the vision priority hypothesis obsolete, because it was based on misleading data and assumptions. The hypothesis assumed that functional OR genes can be correlated to the olfactory capability of a given animal. In this view, a decrease in the fraction of functional OR genes would cause a reduction in the sense of smell; species with higher pseudogene count would also have a decreased olfactory ability. This assumption is flawed. Dogs, which are reputed to have good sense of smell, do not have the largest number of functional OR genes. Additionally, pseudogenes may be functional; 67% of human OR pseudogenes are expressed in the main olfactory epithelium, where they possibly have regulatory roles in gene expression. More importantly, the vision priority hypothesis assumed a drastic loss of functional OR genes at the branch of the OWMs, but this conclusion was based by low-resolution data from only 100 OR genes. High-resolution studies instead agree that primates have lost OR genes in every branch from the MRCA to humans, indicating that the degeneration of OR gene repertories in primates cannot simply be explained by the changing capabilities in vision.

It has been shown that negative selection is still relaxed in modern human olfactory receptors, suggesting that no plateau of minimal function has yet been reached in modern humans and therefore the olfactory capability might still be decreasing. This is considered to provide a first clue to the future human genetic evolution.

== Discovery ==
In 2004 Linda B. Buck and Richard Axel won the Nobel Prize in Physiology or Medicine for their work on olfactory receptors. In 2006, it was shown that another class of odorant receptors – known as trace amine-associated receptors (TAARs) – exist for detecting volatile amines. Except for TAAR1, all functional TAARs in humans are expressed in the olfactory epithelium. A third class of olfactory receptors known as vomeronasal receptors has also been identified; vomeronasal receptors putatively function as pheromone receptors.

As with many other GPCRs, there is still a lack of experimental structures at atomic level for olfactory receptors and structural information is based on homology modeling methods. In 2023 the structure of OR51E2 was found, the first elucidation of the structure of any human olfactory receptor.

The limited functional expression of olfactory receptors in heterologous systems, however, has greatly hampered attempts to deorphanize them (analyze the response profiles of single olfactory receptors) This was first completed by genetically engineered receptor, OR-I7 to characterize the "odor space" of a population of native aldehyde receptors.

== See also ==
- Phantosmia
- Receptor
- Trace amine-associated receptor
- Odorant
- Pseudogenes
- Gene family
