= Richard Axel =

American molecular biologist (born 1946)

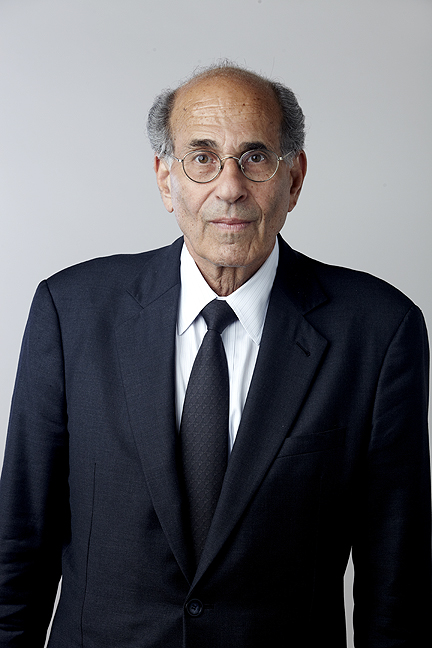
- Axel in 2014
- Born: July 2, 1946 (age 80); New York City, U.S.
- Education: Columbia University (BA); Johns Hopkins University (MD)
- Known for: Work on olfaction; friend of Jeffrey Epstein
- Spouse: Cornelia Bargmann
- Awards: Richard Lounsbery Award (1989); Perl-UNC Prize (2002); Gairdner Foundation International Award (2003); Nobel Prize in Physiology or Medicine (2004)
- Scientific career
- Fields: Neuroscience
- Workplaces: Columbia University
- Notable students: Linda Buck; David J. Anderson; Catherine Dulac; David Julius; Richard Scheller; Leslie B. Vosshall; Vanessa Ruta; Bianca Jones Marlin; Fan Wang (neuroscientist)
- Website: www.axellab.columbia.edu

Richard Axel (born July 2, 1946) is an American molecular biologist and university professor in the Department of Neuroscience at Columbia University and investigator at the Howard Hughes Medical Institute. His work on the olfactory system won him and Linda Buck, a former postdoctoral research scientist in his group, the Nobel Prize in Physiology or Medicine in 2004.

In February 2026, Axel resigned as co-director of Columbia University's Mortimer B. Zuckerman Mind Brain Behavior Institute, calling his past association with Jeffrey Epstein "a serious error in judgment" and apologizing for compromising trust. He also stepped down from the Howard Hughes Medical Institute.

== Education and early life ==
Born in New York City to Polish Jewish immigrants, Axel grew up in Brooklyn. He graduated from Stuyvesant High School in 1963, (along with Bruce Bueno de Mesquita, Allan Lichtman, Ron Silver, and Alexander Rosenberg), received his B.A. in 1967 from Columbia University, and his M.D. in 1971 from Johns Hopkins University. However, he was poorly suited to medicine and graduated on the promise to his department chairman that he would not practice clinically. He found his calling in research and returned to Columbia later that year, eventually becoming a full professor in 1978.

== Research and career ==
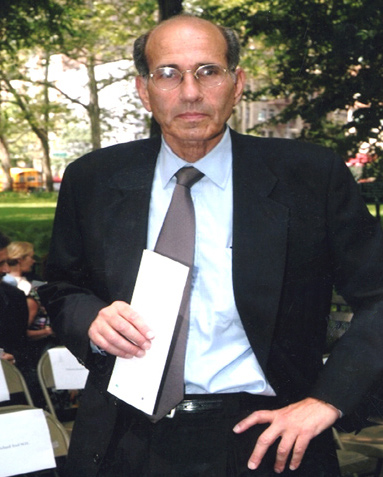
Axel c. 2008

During the late 1970s, Axel, along with microbiologist Saul J. Silverstein and geneticist Michael H. Wigler, discovered a technique of cotransformation via transfection, a process which allows foreign DNA to be inserted into a host cell to produce certain proteins. A family of patents, now colloquially referred to as the "Axel patents", covering this technique were filed for February 1980 and were issued in August 1983. As a fundamental process in recombinant DNA research as performed at pharmaceutical and biotech companies, this patent proved quite lucrative for Columbia University, earning it almost $100 million a year at one time, and a top spot on the list of top universities by licensing revenue. The Axel patents expired in August 2000.

In their landmark paper published in 1991, Buck and Axel cloned olfactory receptors, showing that they belong to the family of G protein coupled receptors. By analyzing rat DNA, they estimated that there were approximately one thousand different genes for olfactory receptors in the mammalian genome. This research opened the door to the genetic and molecular analysis of the mechanisms of olfaction. In their later work, Buck and Axel have shown that each olfactory receptor neuron remarkably only expresses one kind of olfactory receptor protein and that the input from all neurons expressing the same receptor is collected by a single dedicated glomerulus of the olfactory bulb.

Axel's primary research interest is on how the brain interprets the sense of smell, specifically mapping the parts of the brain that are sensitive to specific olfactory receptors. He holds the titles of University Professor at Columbia University, Professor of Biochemistry and Molecular Biophysics and of Pathology at Columbia University's College of Physicians and Surgeons, and Investigator of the Howard Hughes Medical Institute. In addition to contributions to neurobiology, Axel has also made seminal discoveries in immunology, and his lab was one of the first to identify the link between HIV infection and immunoreceptor CD4.

In addition to making contributions as a scientist, Axel has also mentored many leading scientists in the field of neurobiology. Seven of his trainees have become members of the National Academy of Sciences, and currently six of his trainees are affiliated with the Howard Hughes Medical Institute's investigator and early scientist award programs.

== Awards and honors ==
In addition to the Nobel Prize, Axel has won numerous awards and honors. He was elected a Fellow of the American Academy of Arts and Sciences and a member of the National Academy of Sciences in 1983. In 2005, Axel received the Golden Plate Award of the American Academy of Achievement.

Axel was awarded the Double Helix Medal in 2007, and was elected a Foreign Member of the Royal Society (ForMemRS) in 2014. His nomination reads:

Richard Axel is a distinguished molecular biologist and neuroscientist. He developed gene transfer techniques that permit the introduction of virtually any gene into any cell permitting the production of a large number of clinically important proteins and leading to the isolation of a gene for CD4, the cellular receptor for the AIDS virus, HIV. He then applied molecular biology to neuroscience revealing over a thousand genes involved in the recognition of odours, a discovery for which he shared the Nobel Prize in 2004. He currently explores how odour recognition is translated into internal representations in the brain.

== Personal life ==
Axel is married to fellow scientist and olfaction pioneer Cornelia Bargmann. Previously, he had been married to Ann Axel, who is a social worker at Columbia University Medical Center. Owing to his tall stature, Axel played basketball during high school.

== Relationship with Jeffrey Epstein ==
Axel first met Jeffrey Epstein in the 1980s through the biotech world. In 2007, Axel said that Epstein, "He has the ability to make connections that other minds can’t make... He is extremely smart and probing."

In 2010, Axel attended a birthday party in Paris for Jeffrey Epstein, who had been convicted of sex offenses in 2008. The Epstein files show that Axel was a frequent guest at Epstein's Manhattan home. Axel served as a conduit to Columbia admissions and philanthropy for Epstein. Axel maintained continued contact with Epstein until three months prior to his 2019 arrest.

In February 2026, Axel resigned as co-director of the Mortimer B. Zuckerman Mind Brain Behavior Institute at Columbia University. In a statement he said his "past association with Jeffrey Epstein was a serious error in judgment" and apologized "for compromising the trust of my friends, students, and colleagues." He also resigned from his position at the Howard Hughes Medical Institute.

== See also ==
- List of Jewish Nobel laureates
