= Civetone =

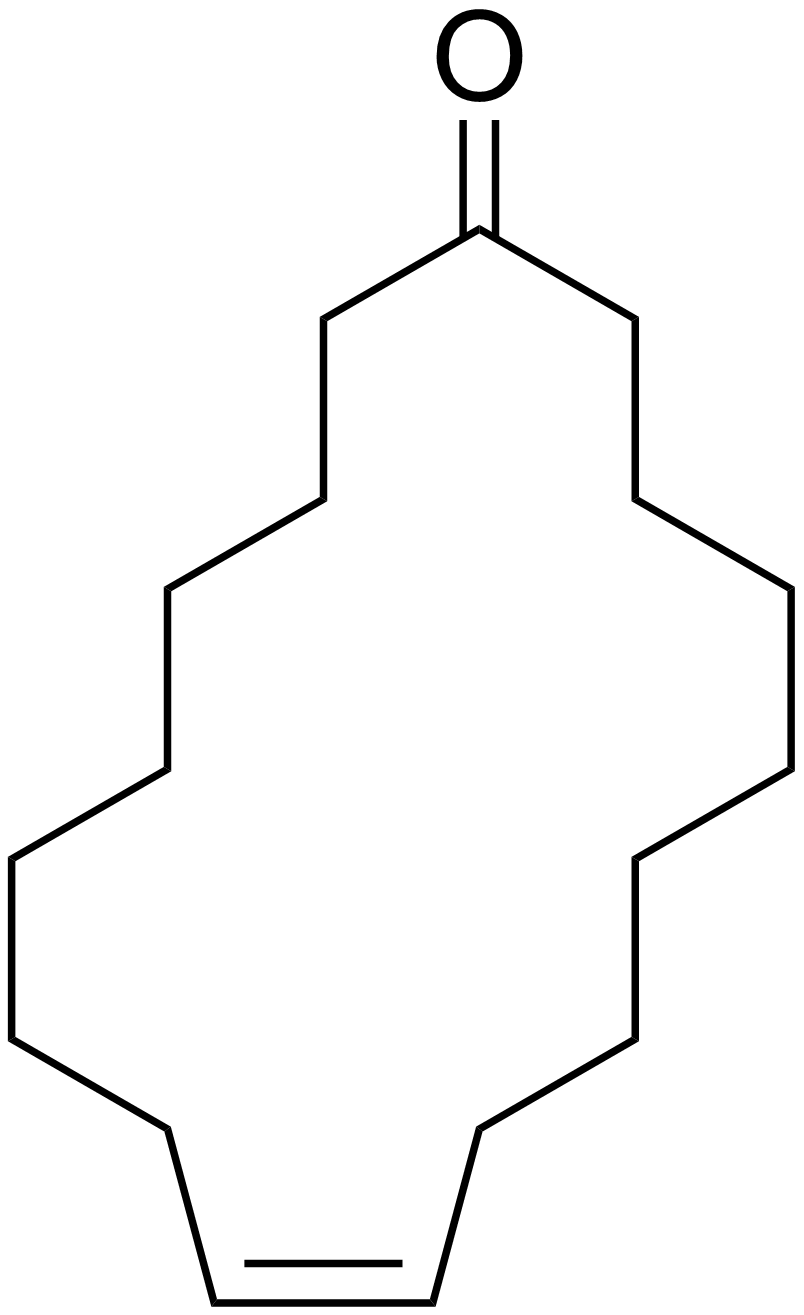

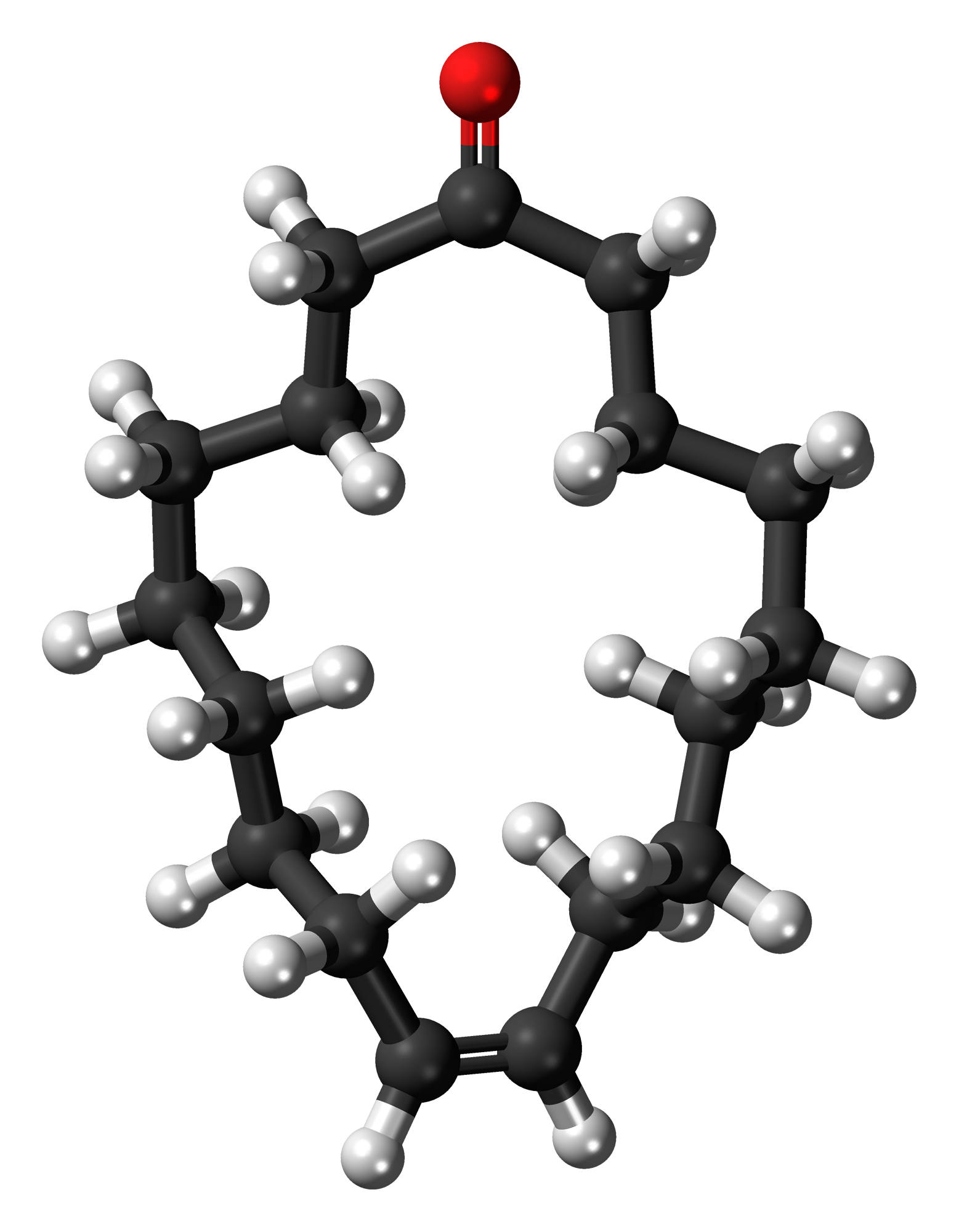

Names
- Preferred IUPAC name (9Z)-Cycloheptadec-9-en-1-one
- Other names cis-Civetone; 9-Cycloheptadecen-1-one; Cycloheptadeca-9-en-1-one; (Z)-9-Cyclohepta-decen-1-one

Identifiers
| CAS Number | 542-46-1 |
| 3D model (JSmol) | Interactive image |
| ChemSpider | 4475121 |
| ECHA InfoCard | 100.008.013 |
| EC Number | 208-813-4 |
| PubChem CID | 5315941 |
| UNII | P0K30CV1UE |
| CompTox Dashboard (EPA) | DTXSID80883434 |
- InChI: InChI=1S/C17H30O/c18-17-15-13-11-9-7-5-3-1-2-4-6-8-10-12-14-16-17/h1-2H,3-16H2/b2-1- Key: ZKVZSBSZTMPBQR-UPHRSURJSA-N; InChI=1/C17H30O/c18-17-15-13-11-9-7-5-3-1-2-4-6-8-10-12-14-16-17/h1-2H,3-16H2/b2-1- Key: ZKVZSBSZTMPBQR-UPHRSURJBS
- SMILES: O=C1CCCCCCC/C=C\CCCCCCC1

Properties
| Chemical formula | C_{17}H_{30}O |
| Molar mass | 250.426 g·mol^{−1} |
| Appearance | Crystalline solid |
| Density | 0.917 at 33 °C |
| Melting point | 31 to 32 °C (88 to 90 °F; 304 to 305 K) |
| Boiling point | 342 °C (648 °F; 615 K) |
| Solubility in oils | soluble |
| Solubility in ethanol | soluble |
| Solubility in water | slightly soluble |
- Except where otherwise noted, data are given for materials in their standard state (at 25 °C [77 °F], 100 kPa). verify (what is ?) Infobox references

Civetone is a macrocyclic ketone and the main odorous constituent of civet oil. It is a pheromone sourced from the African civet. It has a strong musky odor that becomes pleasant at extreme dilutions. Civetone is closely related to muscone, the principal odoriferous compound found in musk; the structure of both compounds was elucidated by Leopold Ružička. Today, civetone can be synthesized from precursor chemicals found in palm oil.

== Uses ==
Civetone is a synthetic musk used as a perfume fixative and flavor. Its aroma is described as "clean, musk, dry, animal, sweet".

In order to attract jaguars to camera traps, field biologists have used the Calvin Klein-brand male cologne Obsession. It is believed that the civetone in the cologne resembles a territorial marking.

== See also ==
- 5-Cyclohexadecenone, a related musk chemical
