= Leslie B. Vosshall =

American neurobiologist

- Leslie Vosshall in 2010
- Born: July 5, 1965 (age 61); Lausanne, Switzerland
- Education: Columbia College of Columbia University
- Known for: insect olfaction
- Scientific career
- Fields: Neuroscience
- Workplaces: The Rockefeller University
- Doctoral advisor: Michael W. Young
- Other academic advisors: Richard Axel

Leslie Birgit Vosshall (born July 5, 1965) is an American neurobiologist and currently a Howard Hughes Medical Institute (HHMI) investigator and the Robin Chemers Neustein Professor of Neurogenetics and Behavior at The Rockefeller University. In 2022 she was appointed Chief Scientific Officer and vice president of HHMI. She is also the director of the Kavli Neural Systems Institute at The Rockefeller University. Vosshall, a member of the National Academy of Sciences, is known for her contributions to the field of olfaction, particularly for the discovery and subsequent characterization of the insect olfactory receptor family, and the genetic basis of chemosensory behavior in mosquitoes. She has also extended her research into the study of human olfaction, revealing parts of human genetic olfactory architecture, and finding variations in odorant receptors that determine individuals’ abilities to detect odors.

== Early life ==
Leslie Vosshall was born in Lausanne, Switzerland where she spent most of her early childhood. Vosshall moved to New Jersey when she was 8 years old. She spent summers from age 17 to 19 working in the laboratory of her uncle, Philip Dunham, with Gerald Weissmann at the Marine Biological Laboratory (MBL) in Woods Hole. Vosshall said this experience was "an incredible introduction to the practice of science."

== Education and Career ==
Vosshall received her B.A. in biochemistry from Columbia University in 1987 and her Ph.D. from Rockefeller University in 1993. She returned to Columbia for a postdoctoral fellowship in the laboratory of future Nobel laureate Richard Axel from 1993 to 1997. She then worked in the position of Associate Research Scientist in Dr. Axel's laboratory from 1997 to 2000.

Vosshall was offered the position of assistant professor at The Rockefeller University in 2000, and was promoted to associate professor in 2006. In April 2010, she was granted tenure and is currently the Robin Chemers Neustein Professor and Head of the Laboratory of Neurogenetics and Behavior. She served as associate director of the Kavli Neural Systems Institute from 2015 to 2016 and was promoted to director in 2016. Vosshall because vice president and chief scientific officer at Howard Hughes Medical Institute in 2022.

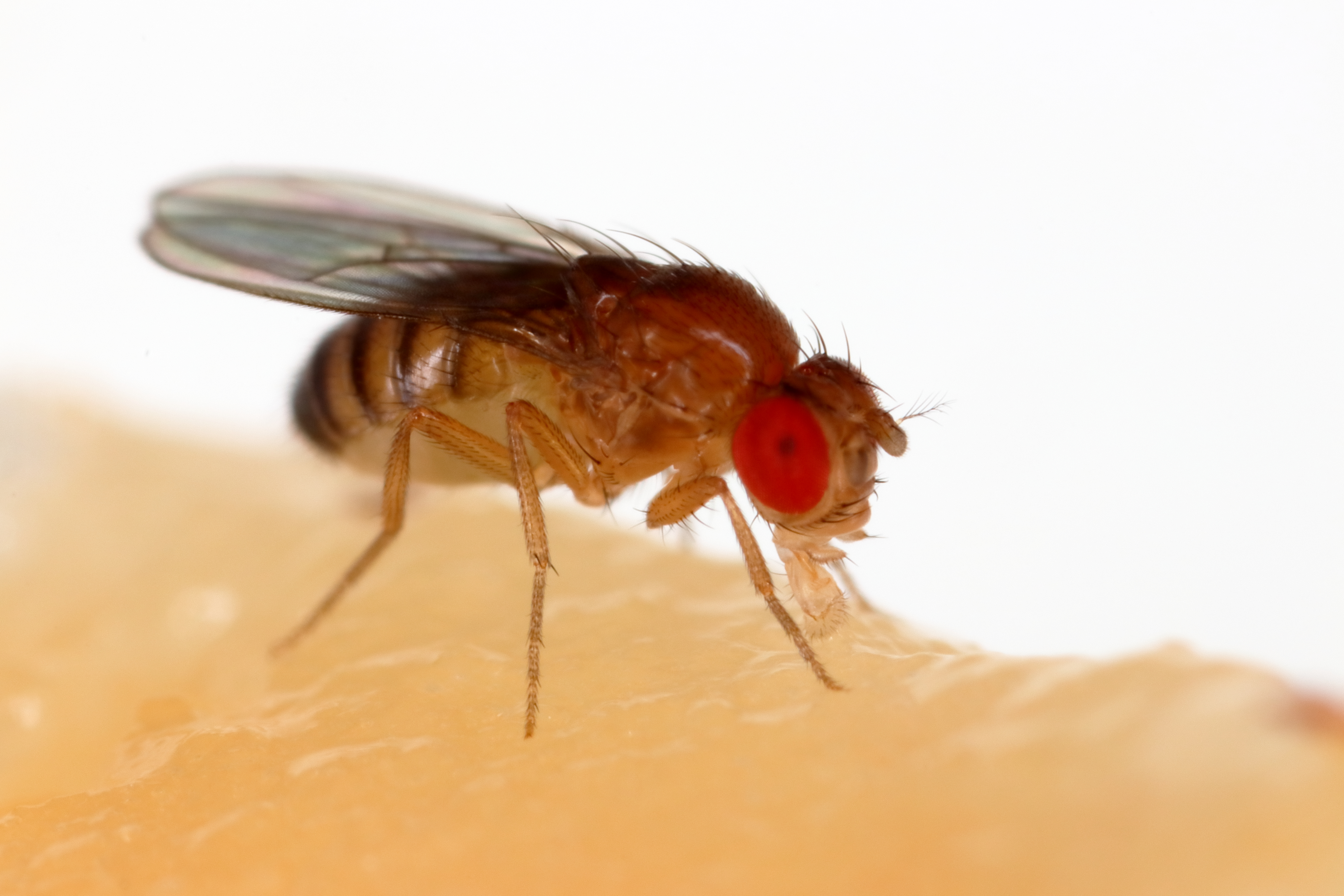
Drosophila Melanogaster, one of the objects of Vosshall's science, alongside humans and mosquitoes

== Research ==
Vosshall's laboratory studies three organisms: fruit flies (Drosophila melanogaster), mosquitoes (the Culicidae) and humans, to understand the genetic and molecular underpinnings, as well as behavioral mechanisms, involved in olfaction and feeding behavior. In addition, to find the genes that make the mosquito species Aedes aegypti prefer humans, Vosshall compares genes that drive host-seeking and blood-seeking behaviors in several different mosquito subspecies. Vosshall's and her associates’ research on Aedes aegypti, the mosquito responsible for transmitting yellow fever, dengue, and Zika, found that it has a particular odor-detecting gene (AaegOr4) that is highly attuned to sulcatone, a compound predominant in human odor. Research from Vosshall's lab demonstrated that a chemical transferred from the male of the species during sex plays a key role in shaping the female's sexual proclivities. In addition, Vosshall and her associates discovered ORCO, a mosquito co-receptor responsible for preference for humans over non-human animals and sensitivity to insect-repellent DEET.

== Awards and honors ==
- Beckman Young Investigator Award (2001)
- Presidential Early Career Award for Scientists and Engineers (2002)
- Blavatnik Award for Young Scientists (2007).
- Howard Hughes Medical Institute investigator (2008)
- W. Alden Spencer Award (Columbia University)(2022)
- Dickson Prize in Medicine (2024)

== Key papers ==
- Vosshall LB, Amrein H, Morozov PS, Rzhetsky A, Axel R (March 1999). "A spatial map of olfactory receptor expression in the Drosophila antenna". Cell. 96 (5): 725–36. doi:10.1016/S0092-8674(00)80582-6. PMID 10089887. S2CID 9216020.
- Vosshall LB, Wong AM, Axel R (July 2000). "An olfactory sensory map in the fly brain". Cell. 102 (2): 147–59. doi:10.1016/S0092-8674(00)00021-0. PMID 10943836. S2CID 17573876.
- DeGennaro M, McBride CS, Seeholzer L, Nakagawa T, Dennis EJ, Goldman C, Jasinskiene N, James AA, Vosshall LB (29 May 2013). "orco mutant mosquitoes lose strong preference for humans and are not repelled by volatile DEET". Nature. 498 (7455): 487–491. Bibcode:2013Natur.498..487D. doi:10.1038/nature12206. PMC 3696029. PMID 23719379.
- Larsson MC, Domingos AI, Jones WD, Chiappe ME, Amrein H, Vosshall LB (September 2, 2004). "Or83b Encodes a Broadly Expressed Odorant Receptor Essential for Drosophila Olfaction". Neuron. 43 (5): 703–714. doi:10.1016/j.neuron.2004.08.019. ISSN 0896-6273

== Other selected publications ==
- McBride, C.S. et al. Evolution of mosquito preference for humans linked to an odorant receptor. Nature 515, 222–227 (2014).
- Bushdid, C. et al. Humans can discriminate more than 1 trillion olfactory stimuli. Science 343, 1370–1372 (2014).
- McMeniman, C.J. et al. Multimodal Integration of Carbon Dioxide and Other Sensory Cues Drives Mosquito Attraction to Humans. Cell 156,1060-1071 (2014).
