= Musk =

Class of aromatic substances used in perfumes

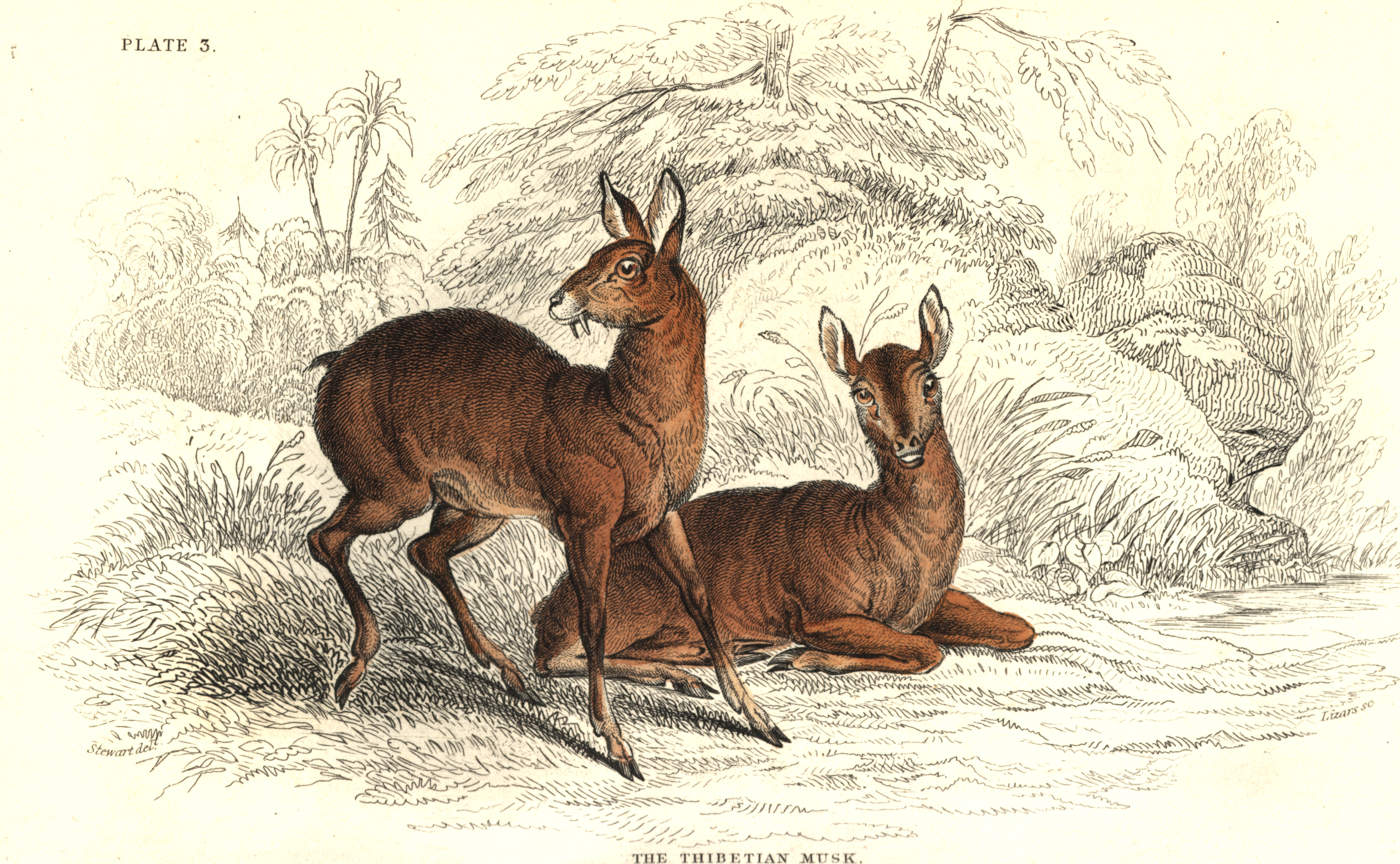
Musk deer of Tibet in an 1835 illustration

Musk is a class of aromatic substances commonly used as base notes in perfumery. They include glandular secretions from animals such as the musk deer, numerous plants emitting similar fragrances, and artificial substances with similar odors. Musk was a name originally given to a substance with a strong odor obtained from a gland of the musk deer. The substance has been used as a popular perfume fixative since ancient times and is one of the most expensive animal products in the world. The name originates from the Late Greek μόσχος 'moskhos', from Persian mushk, in turn from Sanskrit मुष्क muṣka (lit. 'testicle') derived from Proto-Indo-European noun múh₂s meaning "mouse". The deer gland was thought to resemble a scrotum. The term is applied to various plants and animals of similar smell (e.g., muskox) and has come to encompass a wide variety of aromatic substances with similar odors, despite their often differing chemical structures and molecular shapes.

Natural musk was used extensively in perfumery until the late 19th century when economic and ethical motives led to the adoption of synthetic musk, which is now used almost exclusively. The organic compound primarily responsible for the characteristic odor of musk is muscone. There are several ways of preparing the commercial musk, and the best method is to dry the pod by sunning and airing immediately after it is taken from the animal. Natural musk is usually packed in hermetically-sealed vessels and wooden boxes lined with tin foil because of its powerful diffusion of odor.

Modern use of natural musk pods occurs in traditional Chinese medicine which, save for specially exempt drugs, uses a synthetic version of undisclosed composition created in 1994. The process was given State Science and Technology Progress Award First Class in 2015.

== Sources ==
=== Deer ===
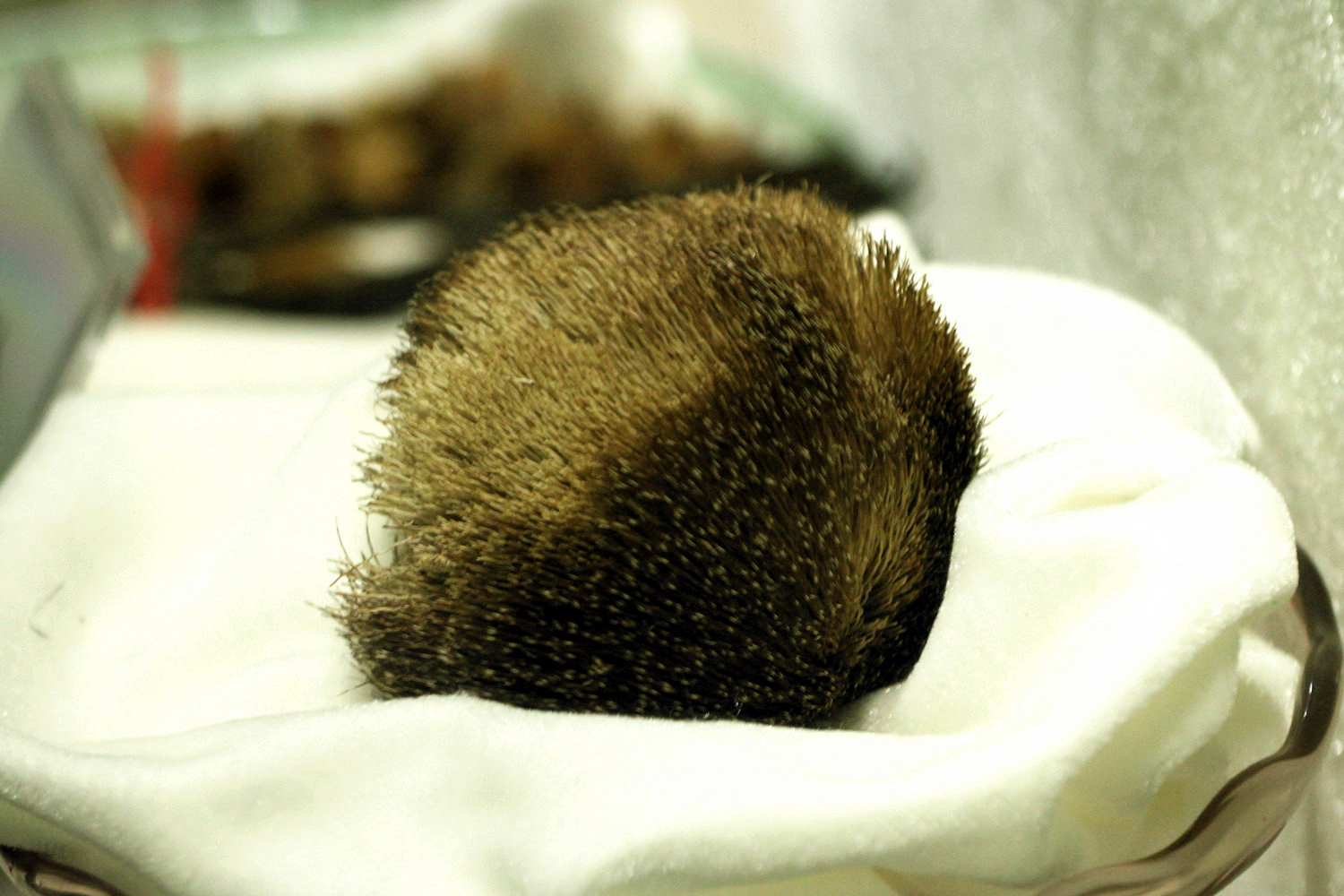
A musk pod, obtained by killing a male musk deer

The musk deer belongs to the family Moschidae and lives in Tibet, India, Nepal, Pakistan, Afghanistan, China, Siberia, Mongolia, Manchuria, Korea and North Vietnam.

The musk pod, a preputial gland in a pouch, or sac, under the skin of the abdomen of the male musk deer, is normally obtained by killing the male deer through traps laid in the wild. Upon drying, the reddish-brown paste inside the musk pod turns into a black granular material called "musk grain", which is then tinctured with alcohol. The aroma of the tincture gives a pleasant odor only after it is considerably diluted. No other natural substance has such a complex aroma associated with so many contradictory descriptions; it is usually described abstractly as animalistic, earthy and woody or something akin to the odor of baby's skin.

Musk has been a key constituent in many perfumes since its discovery, being held to give a perfume long-lasting power as a fixative. Today, the trade quantity of the natural musk is controlled by the Convention on International Trade in Endangered Species of Wild Fauna and Flora (CITES), but illegal poaching and trading continues.

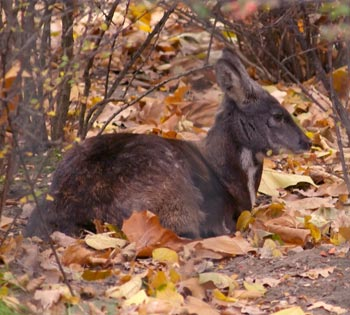
Moschus moschiferus, Siberian musk deer

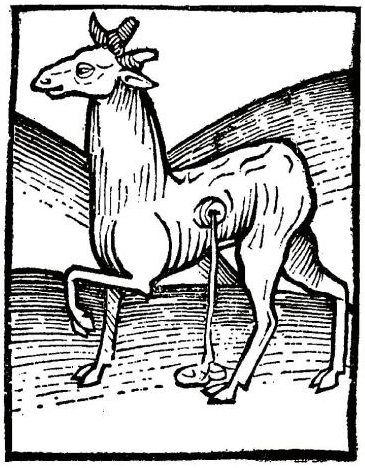
"Musk-cat", woodcut from Hortus Sanitatis, 1491

=== Other animals ===
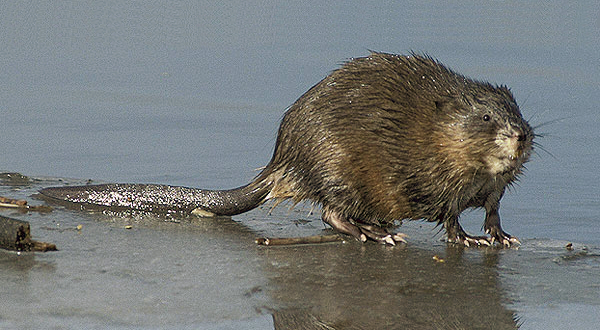
Ondatra zibethicus, the muskrat

Muskrat (Ondatra zibethicus), a rodent native to North America, has been known since the 17th century to secrete a glandular substance with a musky odor. A chemical means of extracting it was discovered in the 1940s, but it did not prove commercially worthwhile.

Glandular substances with musk-like odors are also obtained from the musk duck (Biziura lobata) of southern Australia, the muskox, the musk shrew, the musk beetle (Aromia moschata), the African civet (Civettictis civetta), the musk turtle (Sternotherus odoratus), the American alligator of North America, lynx musk, lungurion which, in antiquity, was highly valued, and from several other animals.

In crocodiles, there are two pairs of musk glands, one pair situated at the corner of the jaw and the other pair in the cloaca.

=== Plants ===
Some plants such as Angelica archangelica or Abelmoschus moschatus produce musky-smelling macrocyclic lactone compounds. These compounds are widely used in perfumery as substitutes for animal musk or to alter the smell of a mixture of other musks.

The plant sources include the musk flower (Mimulus moschatus) of western North America, the muskwood (Olearia argophylla) of Australia, and the musk seeds (Abelmoschus moschatus) from India.

== Synthesis ==
Galaxolide, a polycyclic musk commonly used in laundry detergents to mask the smell of the detergent chemicals

Since obtaining the deer musk requires killing the endangered animal, nearly all musk fragrance used in perfumery today is synthetic, sometimes called "white musk". They can be divided into three major classes: aromatic nitro musks, polycyclic musk compounds, and macrocyclic musk compounds. The first two groups have broad uses in industry ranging from cosmetics to detergents. The detection of the first two chemical groups in human and environmental samples as well as their carcinogenic properties initiated a public debate on the use of these compounds and a ban or reduction of their use in many regions of the world. Macrocyclic musk compounds are expected to replace them since these compounds appear to be safer.

== Fragrance and flavorant ==
Musk is often associated with religious significance. It appears in Buddhist, Hindu and Sufi texts and poetry. Kabir uses a musk deer parable that describes a deer smelling a beautiful scent that it searches for everywhere, unaware that the fragrance comes from its own navel. This parable symbolizes people's mistaken search for God or truth outside when it already resides within. In Islam, musk is considered to be the most fragrant of the scents. It was widely used by the Islamic prophet Muhammad and his companions. Alexander the Great is also said to have perspired the odor of musk. Popular scents in Arab Muslim tradition include jasmine, amber, musk and oud (agarwood).

Orchid paired with musk is a recurring scent combination associated with women's clothing and bedchambers in classical vernacular Chinese literature.

Musk has been used to attract wild animals, including in man-made perfume mixtures. For example, in 2018 Indian authorities used the perfume Obsession by Calvin Klein to attract and thus trap a wild tiger that had attacked and killed more than a dozen humans.

Musk sticks, which are artificially flavoured with a substance that is reminiscent of musk perfume, are a popular confection in Australia.

== See also ==
- Androstenol
- Civetone
