= Muscone =

- Muscone

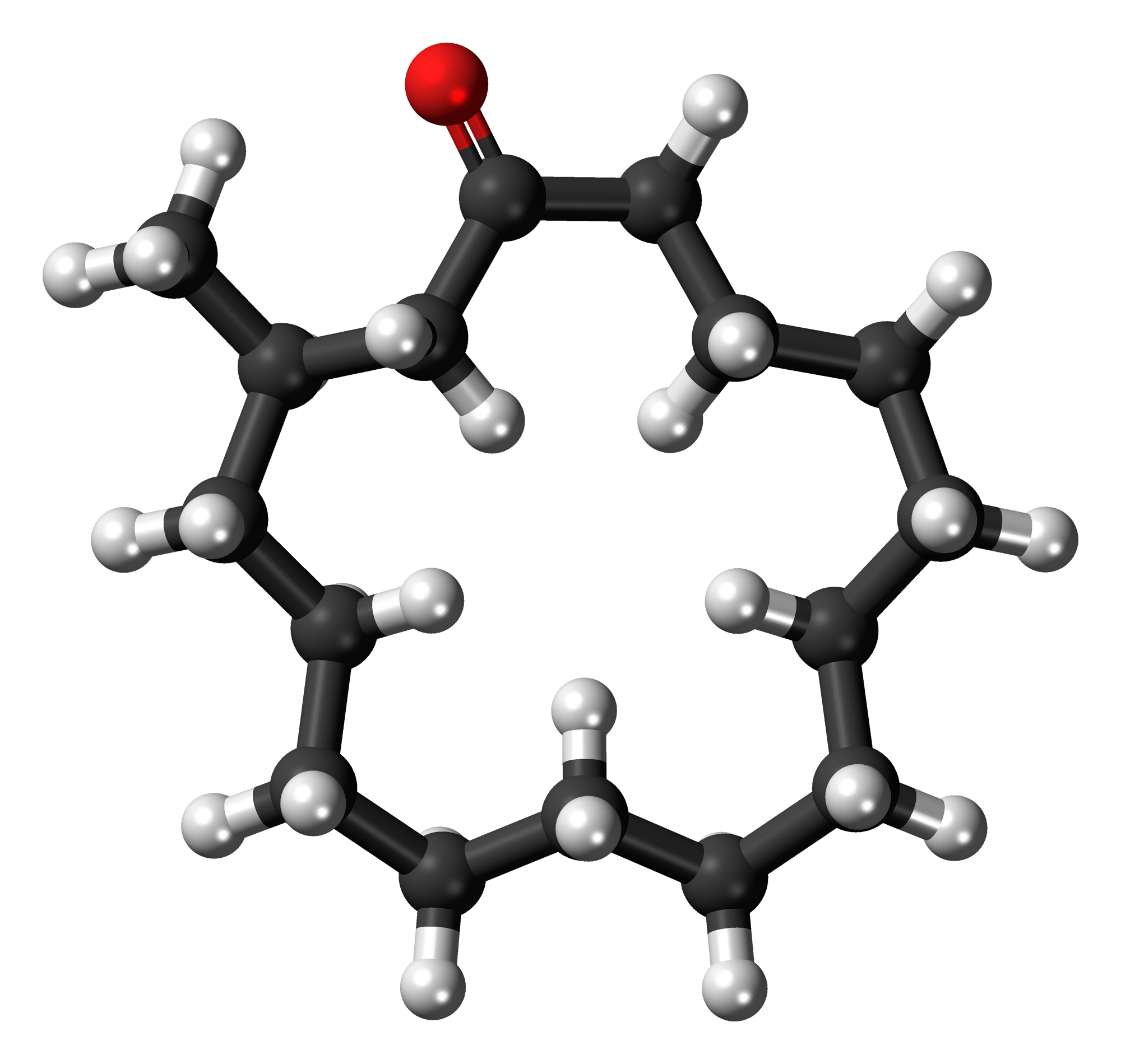

Names
- Preferred IUPAC name (3R)-3-Methylcyclopentadecan-1-one

Identifiers
CAS Number	541-91-3
3D model (JSmol)	Interactive image
ChEMBL	ChEMBL3731037
ChemSpider	5499607
ECHA InfoCard	100.007.997
EC Number	208-795-8
PubChem CID	10947
UNII	UPS3C6CV36
CompTox Dashboard (EPA)	DTXSID8052192
- InChI: InChI=1S/C16H30O/c1-15-12-10-8-6-4-2-3-5-7-9-11-13-16(17)14-15/h15H,2-14H2,1H3/t15-/m1/s1 Key: ALHUZKCOMYUFRB-OAHLLOKOSA-N; InChI=1/C16H30O/c1-15-12-10-8-6-4-2-3-5-7-9-11-13-16(17)14-15/h15H,2-14H2,1H3/t15-/m1/s1 Key: ALHUZKCOMYUFRB-OAHLLOKOBX
- SMILES: C[C@@H]1CCCCCCCCCCCCC(=O)C1

Properties
Chemical formula	C_{16}H_{30}O
Molar mass	238.415 g·mol^{−1}
Density	0.9221 g/cm^{3}
Melting point	−15 °C (5 °F; 258 K)
Boiling point	328 °C (622 °F; 601 K)

Hazards
NFPA 704 (fire diamond)	1 1 1
- Except where otherwise noted, data are given for materials in their standard state (at 25 °C [77 °F], 100 kPa). verify (what is ?) Infobox references

Muscone is a macrocyclic ketone, an organic compound that is the primary contributor to the odor of deer musk. Natural muscone is obtained from musk, a glandular secretion of the musk deer, which has been used in perfumery and medicine for thousands of years. Since obtaining natural musk requires killing the endangered animal, nearly all muscone used in perfumery and for scenting consumer products today is synthetic. It has the characteristic smell of being "musky" (described as "musk, animal, powdery").

== Chemical structure and synthesis ==
The chemical structure of muscone was first elucidated by Leopold Ružička. It is a 15-membered ring ketone with one methyl substituent in the 3-position. It is an oily liquid that is found naturally as the (−)-enantiomer, (R)-3-methylcyclopentadecanone. Muscone has been synthesized as the pure (−)-enantiomer as well as the racemate. It is very slightly soluble in water and miscible with alcohol.

One asymmetric synthesis of (−)-muscone begins with commercially available (+)-citronellal, and forms the 15-membered ring via ring-closing metathesis:

Synthesis of muscone via RCM

A more recent enantioselective synthesis involves an intramolecular aldol addition/dehydration reaction of a macrocyclic diketone.

== Isotopologs ==
Isotopologs of muscone have been used in a study of the mechanism of olfaction. Global replacement of all hydrogen atoms in muscone was achieved by heating muscone in heavy water (D_{2}O) at 150 °C in the presence of a rhodium on carbon catalyst. It was found that the human musk-recognizing receptor, OR5AN1, identified using a heterologous olfactory receptor expression system and robustly responding to muscone, fails to distinguish between muscone and the so-prepared isotopolog in vitro. OR5AN1 is reported to bind to muscone and related musks such as civetone through hydrogen-bond formation from tyrosine-260 along with hydrophobic interactions with surrounding aromatic residues in the receptor.
