= Leo Sternbach =

Polish-American chemist (1908–2005)

- Born: May 7, 1908; Opatija, Austria-Hungary (later Croatia)
- Died: September 28, 2005 (aged 97); Chapel Hill, North Carolina, U.S.
- Education: Jagiellonian University
- Occupation: chemist
- Known for: first synthesis of benzodiazepines

Leo Sternbach (May 7, 1908 – September 28, 2005) was a Polish American chemist credited with the first synthesis of benzodiazepines, the most widely-used class of minor tranquilizers.

== Background and family ==
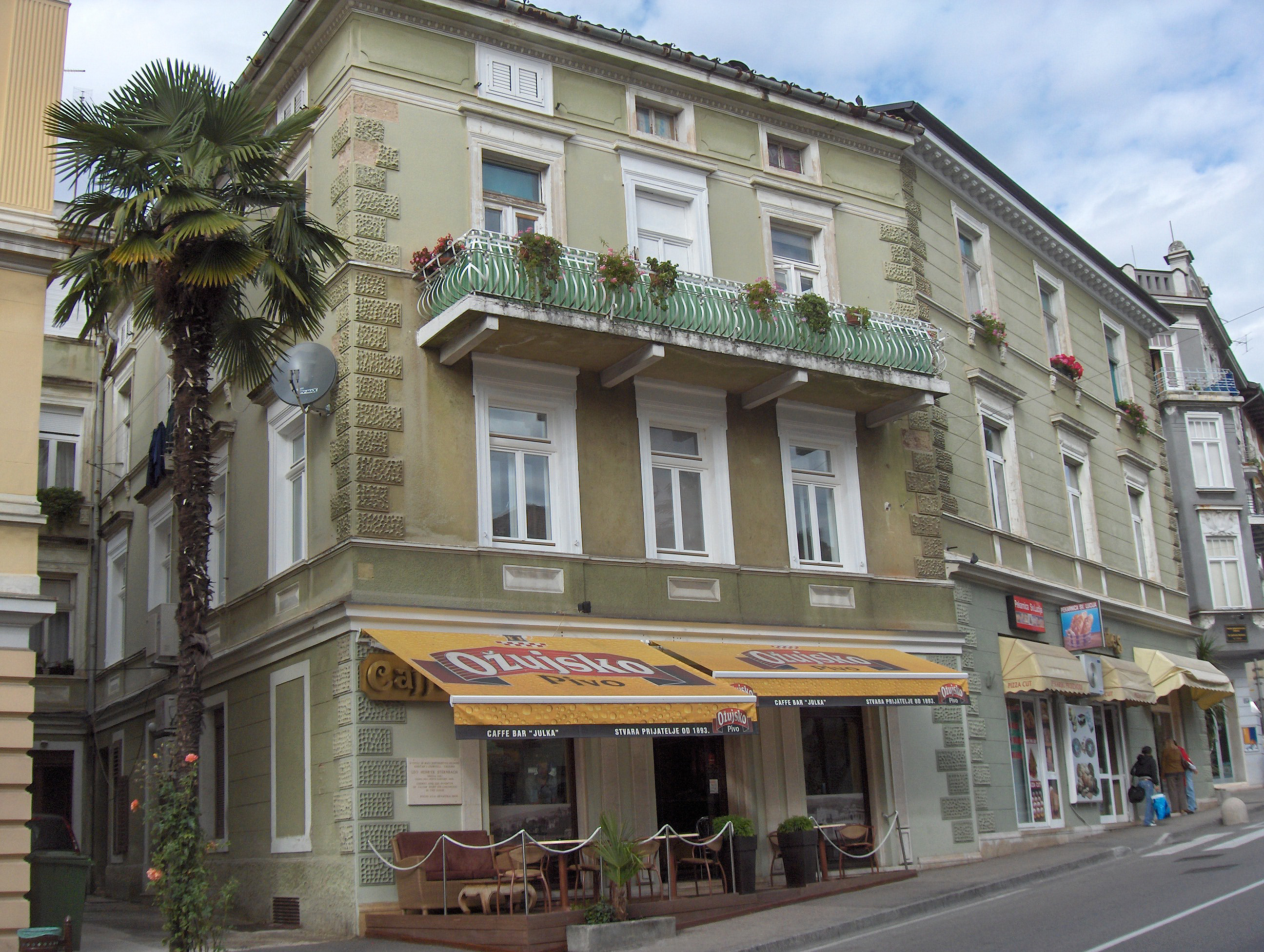
Villa Adriatic where Leo Sternbach spent his childhood in Opatija, Croatia

Sternbach was born on May 7, 1908, in Opatija, Kingdom of Hungary, Austro-Hungarian Empire, to an upper middle class Jewish family. He had a younger brother, Giusi. His father Michael Abracham Sternbach was from the Polish city of Przemyśl in Galicia (then part of Austria-Hungary), and his mother Piroska (née Cohn) Sternbach was from Orosháza, Hungary. Sternbach's parents met and married in Opatija where they both lived. The family lived in modest conditions, in a rented four-room apartment on the third floor of the "Vila Jadran" (Villa Adriatic), near the pharmacy owned by Sternbach's father. Sternbach attended a private German school in Opatija until it was closed in 1920, and—since he could not speak Italian—continued his schooling in Villach, Graz, and Bielitz. In 1926, Sternbach moved with his family to Kraków, Poland. In the same year, his younger brother died of scarlet fever, at the age of fifteen.

== Education and career ==
Sternbach received his master's degree in pharmacy in 1929 and his doctoral degree in organic chemistry in 1931 from the Jagiellonian University in Kraków. In 1937, he received a scholarship from Feliks-Wislicki Foundation. He moved to Vienna and then to Zürich where he continued his research started in Kraków. In Vienna he worked with Wolfgang Joseph Pauli, sr. and Sigmund Fränkel, after which he worked with Leopold Ružička at the Swiss Federal Institute of Technology in Zurich. When war started, he was still in Switzerland. His mother, Hungarian born, survived hidden by Poles. While in Basel on June 1, 1940, he joined Hoffmann-La Roche, his employer until 2003. He married Herta Kreuzer. In 1941, he moved to the United States to work at Hoffmann-La Roche in Nutley, New Jersey, thus escaping the Nazis.

While working for Hoffmann-La Roche in Nutley, New Jersey, Sternbach worked on new drugs. He is credited with the discovery of chlordiazepoxide (Librium), diazepam (Valium), flurazepam (Dalmane), nitrazepam (Mogadon), flunitrazepam (Rohypnol), clonazepam (Klonopin), and trimethaphan (Arfonad). Librium, based on the R0 6-690 compound discovered by Sternbach in 1956, was approved for use in 1960. In 1963, its improved version, Valium, was released and became very popular: between 1969 and 1982, it was the most prescribed drug in America, with over 2.3 billion doses sold in its peak year of 1978. With Moses Wolf Goldberg, Sternbach also developed "the first commercially applicable" method for synthesizing biotin.

Sternbach held 241 patents, and his discoveries helped to turn Hoffmann-La Roche into a pharmaceutical industry giant. He did not become wealthy from his discoveries, but he was happy; he treated chemistry as a passion and said, "I always did just what I wanted to do". He was active in his career until the age of 95. Sternbach was a longtime resident of Upper Montclair, New Jersey, from 1943 to 2003. He then moved to Chapel Hill, North Carolina, where he died in 2005.

== Legacy ==
A book Good chemistry: The life and legacy of Valium inventor Leo Sternbach was published by McGraw-Hill in 2004.

Sternbach's uncle, Leon Sternbach, the brother of Sternbach's father Michael, was a professor of classical philology at Jagiellonian University. He was murdered in 1940 in the Nazi Sachsenhausen concentration camp as the result of the Nazi action against Polish academic teachers called Sonderaktion Krakau. His killer was Gustav Sorge.

Sternbach is a member of the New Jersey Inventor's Hall of Fame; and was inducted into the National Inventors Hall of Fame in February 2005, a few months before his death. Sternbach is a member of the Medicinal Chemistry Hall of Fame.
