= Chatziioannou =

Chatziioannou is a Greek surname. Notable people with the surname include:

- Christos Chatziioannou (born 2004), Greek footballer
- Maria Christina Chatziioannou (fl. 2003), Greek historian

== See also ==
- Nefeli Chatziioannidou (fl. 2023), Greek politician
- Natalia Chatzigiannidou (born 1979), Greek footballer
