= Iphigenia Photaki =

Greek organic chemist (1921–1983)

- Ιφιγένεια Βουρβίδου-Φωτάκη
- Born: 1921; Corinth, Greece
- Died: 1983 (aged 61–62); Athens, Greece
- Other name: Iphigenia Vourvidou-Photaki (after marriage)
- Education: University of Athens
- Known for: Chemical synthesis of complex and biologically active peptides
- Awards: Georgios Panopoulos Prize of the Academy of Athens (1970)
- Scientific career
- Fields: Organic chemistry, Peptide chemistry
- Workplaces: University of Athens (Laboratory and research assistant, 1943–1953); University of Basel (Researcher, 1953–1956); Biochemical Laboratory of Evangelismos Hospital (Researcher, 1956–1959); National Hellenic Research Foundation (Researcher, 1959–1962); Cornell University (Researcher, 1962–1963); University of Athens (Researcher, 1963–1965; Privatdozentin, 1965–1975; Extraordinary professor, 1975–1977; Professor of Organic Chemistry, 1977–1983)
- Theses: Ἔρευναι ἐπὶ τῆς Γλυκοζαμίνης (Note: English: Investigations on Glucosamine) (1950; doctoral thesis); Περὶ Ὀξυτοκίνης (Note: English: On Oxytocin) (1965; habilitation thesis)
- Doctoral advisor: Leonidas Zervas

Iphigenia Photaki (Greek: Ιφιγένεια Φωτάκη, pronounced [ifiˈʝeni.a foˈtaki]; also known after marriage as Iphigenia Vourvidou-Photaki, Greek: Ιφιγένεια Βουρβίδου-Φωτάκη; 1921–1983) was a Greek organic chemist remembered for her contributions in peptide chemical synthesis, especially in the synthesis of biologically/enzymatically active peptides.

Photaki was in 1965 the fourth woman overall to be habilitated in a scientific discipline in Greece, and the second to do so in the field of Chemistry. She specialised in peptide synthesis, influenced by her mentor and doctoral advisor Leonidas Zervas, a global authority on the subject. After distinguished research in Basel, Athens, and later Cornell, Photaki eventually rose to Professor of Organic Chemistry and Head of the Laboratory of Organic Chemistry of the University of Athens.

== Biography ==
=== Early life, start of career and Basel ===
Photaki was born in Corinth in 1921 and finished her secondary education at the 2nd Girls' Gymnasium of Athens in 1938. In the same year she enrolled at the Department of Chemistry in the University of Athens, where she specialised in Organic chemistry under the mentorship of Leonidas Zervas. Her studies were interrupted during the Axis occupation of Greece when the Laboratory of Organic Chemistry was destroyed and Zervas was imprisoned as a member of the Greek Resistance. Photaki was finally awarded her degree summa cum laude in 1946 and subsequently continued her postgraduate studies under Zervas, earning her PhD in 1950 with a dissertation regarding glucosamine. Concurrently, she held a paid laboratory assistant position at the university already from 1943, carrying on as a research assistant until 1953.

In 1953, Photaki was awarded a scholarship to conduct research in Basel after examinations by the Greek State Scholarships Foundation. At the University of Basel she worked in the Laboratory of Organic Chemistry, at the time headed by Nobel laureate Tadeusz Reichstein. For the first two years of her stay (1953–1955) she was part of the Max Brenner research group, later moving as an independent scientific associate of Hans Erlenmeyer. Upon returning to Greece, she initially worked at the biochemical lab of the Evangelismos Hospital before being invited by Zervas to the nascent National Hellenic Research Foundation (NHRF) which he had helped found.

=== Cornell and later career in Athens ===
Photaki was selected in 1962 by the US Department of Health, Education and Welfare among an international pool of candidates to conduct research by the side of Nobel laureate Vincent du Vigneaud at Cornell University. While in New York, she also delivered a short series of lectures both in Cornell and at the National Institutes of Health (NIH).

Back in the University of Athens after Cornell, Photaki continued her research and was soon habilitated in 1965 following a thesis on oxytocin, building on the work she started under du Vigneaud. Despite her internationally distinguished research and sizeable recent grants from the NHRF and the United States NIH, she was not allowed to teach by the Greek military junta until 1969 and was intensively interrogated by the Cities Police Security Directorate on account of her anti-dictatorial political beliefs.

Photaki's teaching career was purposefully hindered by the Ministry of Education until the restoration of democracy in 1974; indeed, in 1975 she was promoted to extraordinary professor, a decade after receiving her habilitation. Shortly afterwards, in 1977, she was promoted to full professor (as Professor of Organic Chemistry) and Head of the Organic Chemistry Laboratory, both positions once held by her mentor Zervas. Photaki died in 1983 at the age of 62.

She was reported to spend very long hours at the laboratory, occasionally from "8 in the morning till 10 in the evening". In her 20-year career as a member of the University of Athens faculty, she supervised (alone or jointly with other colleagues) more than 15 doctoral dissertations.

== Scientific work ==
Although many of Photaki's important contributions were related to peptide synthesis, her scientific work touched on a large number of topics within organic synthesis. In total she published around 50 papers in international English- or German-language chemical journals.

=== Peptide synthesis ===
Continuing and expanding the tradition of the University of Athens within the subject, starting from Zervas of Bergmann-Zervas carbobenzoxy method fame, Photaki initially worked on further refinement of suitable protecting groups for oligopeptide synthesis. She investigated with Zervas new types of protection such as N-protection with benzyl phosphate esters (N-phosphamide derivatives), S-protection using trityl, benzhydryl or benzoyl groups (as part of the greater effort for the synthesis of asymmetric cysteine-containing peptides), N-protection using the o-nitrophenylsulfenyl (NPS) group discovered in their Athens laboratory, or S-protection using the p-methoxycarbobenzoxy group (a modification of the Z group).

With the above methodologies she embarked on the synthesis of complex polypeptides, especially fragments of enzyme active sites and peptide hormones. Some notable achievements in papers Photaki co-authored include the first synthesis of the 20-membered insulin intra-chain ring or –following her research under du Vigneaud– several previously inaccessible oxytocin analogues (e.g. 4-deamido-oxytocin) and a novel oxytocin synthesis via a different route than the du Vigneaud synthesis.

In later years she also examined the preparation of biologically active atypical peptides such as N^{ω}-arginine or lanthionine-containing peptides.

=== Other research ===
With her expertise on peptide synthesis, Photaki examined the biocatalytic properties and kinetics of enzyme active site analogues she prepared.

Another research topic she developed in the early part of her career was the chemical transformation of carbohydrates and glycosylated species, such as the stereoselective conversion of D-glucosamine to L-serinaldehyde which formed the basis of her doctoral thesis.

Finally, she examined some of the coordination complexes formed by histidine-containing peptides with Cu^{2+}, Co^{2+}, Zn^{2+} and Ce^{4+}, and after the antitumour properties of platinum complexes were realised, she also worked on the peptide enzymatic reactions in the presence of Pt^{2+} amine complexes.

== Honours and awards ==
In 1970 Iphigenia Vourvidou-Photaki was awarded the one-off Georgios Panopoulos Prize of the Academy of Athens, presented to her for "...her research on the chemical synthesis of polypeptide hormones and investigation of enzyme active sites, which constitute an internationally notable contribution of Greek science to the modern discipline of Chemistry".

During her lifetime, she was invited many times as a distinguished researcher in academic conferences related to her subject; some examples were the personal invitations she received to the 3rd European Peptide Symposium (EPS) (Basel, 1960), the 5th EPS (Oxford, 1962), 6th EPS (Athens, 1963 as organiser), 6th International Biochemistry Conference (New York, 1964), 7th EPS (Budapest, 1964), Symposium on Natural Sulfur Compounds (Copenhagen, 1966), NATO Seminar of Molecular Biology (Spetses, 1966), 8th EPS (Noordwijk, 1966), 9th EPS (Paris, 1968), 10th EPS (Abano, 1970), 11th EPS (Vienna, 1971), 3rd American Peptide Symposium (APS) (Boston, 1972), 13th EPS (Kiryat, 1974), 4th APS (New York, 1975), and the 14th EPS (Wépion, 1976) over which she presided.
