= Cleome pubescens =

Cleome pubescens can refer to:

- Cleome pubescens Sieber ex Steud., a synonym of Cleome gynandra L.
- Cleome pubescens Sims, a synonym of Cleome spinosa Jacq.
