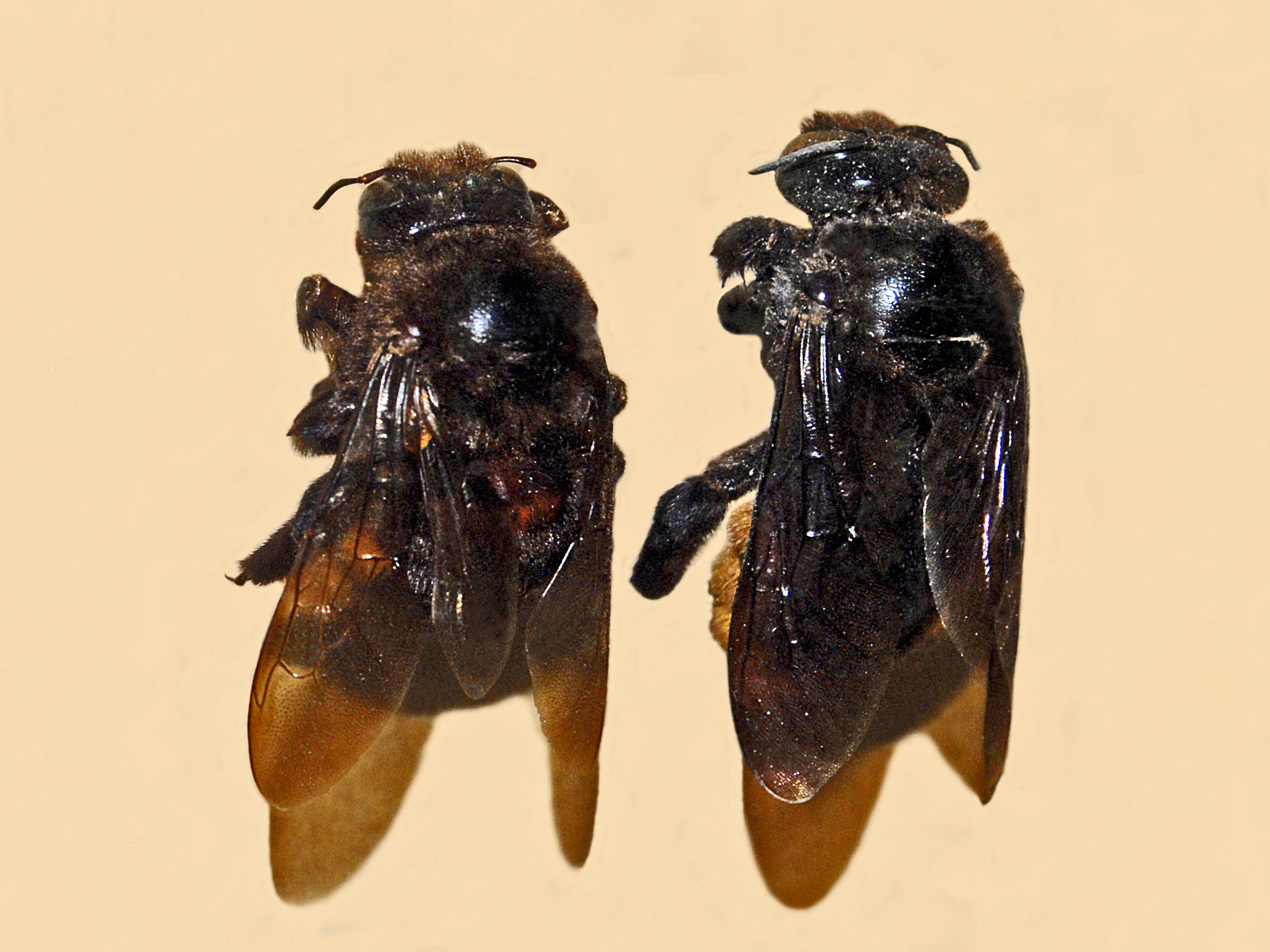
- Xylocopa augusti from Brazil

Scientific classification
- Kingdom: Animalia
- Phylum: Arthropoda
- Class: Insecta
- Order: Hymenoptera
- Family: Apidae
- Genus: Xylocopa
- Species: X. augusti

Binomial name
- Xylocopa augusti Lepeletier, 1841

Synonyms
- Xylocopa ferruginea Lepeletier, 1841; Xylocopa augusti pterochloris Brèthes, 1916; Xylocopa guaranitica Brèthes, 1916

= Xylocopa augusti =

Species of bee

Xylocopa augusti is a species of carpenter bee.

== Description ==
Xylocopa augusti can reach a length of about 25–30 millimetres (0.98–1.18 in). These large and robust carpenter bees show a black body integument with conspicuous lateral ferruginous setae. Wings are dark brown with violet iridescence. Males are tawny, with two tufts of setae on the ventral surface of the metatibia. They can be encountered from December to March. They nest in wood and tree trunks.

== Floral association ==
They are commonly associated to flowers of Passiflora species, but also of Agapanthus praecox, Alstroemeria pulchra, Cleome spinosa, Parkinsonia aculeatam, Quillaja saponaria, Robinia pseudoacacia, Solanum crispum, Styphnolobium japonicum, Eucalyptus sp. and Amaryllis sp. .

== Distribution ==
This species can be found in Argentina, Chile, Brazil, Paraguay and Uruguay.
