= Leonidas Zervas =

Greek organic chemist (1902–1980)

- Λεωνίδας Ζέρβας
- Born: 21 May 1902; Megalopolis, Greece
- Died: 10 July 1980 (aged 78); Athens, Greece
- Education: University of Athens; University of Berlin
- Known for: Carboxybenzyl protecting group, Peptide synthesis
- Spouse: Hildegard Lange
- Awards: Member of the Academy of Athens (1956); Honorary Membership of the American Society of Biological Chemists (1969); Order of Scientific Merit (1st class) of the SR of Romania (1976); Foreign Member of the USSR Academy of Sciences (1976); Max Bergmann Golden Medal (1981)
- Scientific career
- Fields: Organic chemistry
- Workplaces: Kaiser Wilhelm Institute for Leather Research (Researcher, 1926–1929; Vice-Director, 1929–1934); Rockefeller Institute for Medical Research (Lecturer, 1934–1937); Aristotle University of Thessaloniki (Professor of Organic Chemistry and Biochemistry, 1937–1939); University of Athens (Professor of Organic Chemistry, 1939–1968); National Cancer Institute (Visiting scientist, 1956–1958); Greek Atomic Energy Commission (President, 1964–1965 & 1974–1975); Academy of Athens (President, 1970–1971); National Hellenic Research Foundation (Vice-President, 1958–1968; President, 1974–1979)
- Thesis: Über die Aldehydverbindungen der Aminosäuren (Note: English: On the Aldehyde Compounds of Amino Acids) (1926)
- Doctoral advisor: Max Bergmann
- Notable students: Panayotis Katsoyannis; Iphigenia Photaki

Leonidas Zervas (Greek: Λεωνίδας Ζέρβας, pronounced [leoˈniðas ˈzervas]; 21 May 1902 – 10 July 1980) was a Greek organic chemist who made seminal contributions in peptide chemical synthesis. Together with his mentor Max Bergmann they laid the foundations for the field in 1932 with their major discovery, the Bergmann-Zervas carboxybenzoxy oligopeptide synthesis which remained unsurpassed in utility for the next two decades. The carboxybenzyl protecting group he discovered is often abbreviated Z in his honour.

Throughout his life Zervas also served in many important posts, including President of the Academy of Athens or briefly Minister of Industry of Greece. He received numerous awards and honours during his life and posthumously, such as Foreign Member of the USSR Academy of Sciences or the first Max Bergmann golden medal.

== Biography ==
=== Early life and career abroad ===
Zervas was born in 1902 in the rural town of Megalopolis in Arcadia, southern Greece. He was the first of 7 children of lawyer and parliamentarian Theodoros Zervas with Vasiliki Zerva (née Gyftaki). After finishing secondary education at the local Gymnasion of Kalamata in 1918, he went to study Chemistry at the University of Athens. Before finishing his studies there, he moved to Berlin in 1921 where he graduated with a degree in chemistry from the University of Berlin in 1924.

Under the supervision of Max Bergmann, he finished his doctoral thesis on the reactions of amino acids with aldehydes and was awarded his Dr. rer. nat. from the University of Berlin in 1926. He proceeded to work with Bergmann in the Kaiser Wilhelm Institute for Leather Research in Dresden, of which Bergmann was the founder and director. From 1926 to 1929 Zervas was a research associate and eventually rose to head of the organic chemistry division and vice-director of the institute (1929–1934). It was at this period that the two men developed the Bergmann-Zervas oligopeptide synthesis which brought them international fame within academic circles.

Zervas, by that point a close personal friend of Bergmann, decided to follow the latter to the US in 1934 after Bergmann emigrated from Nazi Germany in 1933 under pressure due to his Jewish origin. In New York, Zervas spent 3 years as lecturer and researcher at the Rockefeller Institute for Medical Research.

In 1930, he married Hildegard Lange, and they remained together until his death.

=== Return to Greece ===
After his Berlin, Dresden and New York years, Zervas decided to return to Greece in 1937. He was immediately appointed full Professor of Organic Chemistry and Biochemistry at the Aristotle University of Thessaloniki in recognition of his distinguished international work. He stayed in this position until 1939, when he was invited to the Professorship of Organic Chemistry at the University of Athens and also appointed director of the Laboratory of Organic Chemistry of the same institution. He continued conducting research, despite the severe limitations he often faced from the lack of equipment and funding. Concurrent to research, Zervas taught organic chemistry, oversaw the laboratory and guided many generations of young chemists as doctoral advisor for the 29 years he held the post at the University of Athens.

During the Axis occupation of Greece Zervas played an active part in the Greek Resistance as a member of EDES; he was imprisoned twice, first by the Italian and then by the German occupying forces, and his laboratory was destroyed. Following the liberation of Greece, Zervas managed to secure a small part of the American postwar aid for repairs in the University of Athens and the Athens Polytechnic, and thus rebuilt his laboratory in 1948–1951.

In the following years, guided by a sense of personal and professional duty, Zervas voluntarily took on a variety of responsibilities within the Greek state. At his own insistence, he never got paid for these posts and kept receiving only his professorial salary. Some notable positions he held in chronological order until 1968 include:

- Member of the State Committee on Vocational Education (1948–1951)
- Member of numerous committees for the foundation of new industries in postwar Greece (throughout the 1950s)
- First Vice-President of the National Hellenic Research Foundation (1958–1968), of which he was a key founder
- Minister of Industry in the Paraskevopoulos technocratic caretaker government (1963–1964)
- President of the Greek Atomic Energy Commission (1964–1965)

The democratic ideals of Zervas made him a target of the military junta established in 1967, which removed him from his position in the University of Athens in 1968 after almost three decades of dedicated research and teaching. In response, the Academy of Athens of which Zervas had been a member since 1956 elected him as its president in 1970. After his term as President of the Academy, Zervas retired in 1971.

=== Later years ===
With the restoration of democracy in 1974, Zervas was able to contribute once more to research and educational policy. As previously, refusing to take a salary for these positions, he served a second time as the President of the Greek Atomic Energy Commission (1974–1975) and then as the President of the National Hellenic Research Foundation (1975–1979).

Zervas had suffered from periodic issues with respiratory health throughout his adult life, but in his final years the situation deteriorated. The extended use of phosgene in his research has been implicated as the cause of this chronic pulmonary disease. He showed perseverance and a pleasant attitude despite his health issues, continuing to attend meetings of the Academy of Athens until the very end of his life. This came in the summer of 1980 after an acute pulmonary episode, which lasted three weeks before he died at the age of 78.

== Contribution to Chemistry ==
The enduring contributions of Zervas were made together with Bergmann and involved the first successful synthesis of substantial length oligopeptides. They achieved this using the carboxybenzyl amine protecting group for the masking of the N-terminus of the growing oligopeptide chain to which amino acid residues are added in a serial manner. The carboxybenzyl group discovered by Zervas is introduced by reaction with benzyl chloroformate, originally in aqueous sodium carbonate solution at 0 °C:

Introduction of Z protecting group

The protecting group is abbreviated Cbz or, in honour of Zervas, simply Z. The typical route for deprotection involves hydrogenolysis under mild conditions e.g. with hydrogen gas and a catalyst such as palladium on charcoal.

The discovery of the Bergmann-Zervas synthesis has been characterised as "epoch-making" as it allowed the advent of controlled synthetic peptide chemistry, completing the work started in the early 20th century by Bergmann's mentor Emil Fischer. Previously impossible to synthesise oligopeptides with a highly specific sequence and reactive side chains were consequently produced in the 1930s by Bergmann and Zervas. The ability of Z-protection to prevent racemization of activated derivatives of the protected amino acids and the importance thereof were also noted by the two chemists.

Indeed, their method became the standard in the field for the following two decades until further developments in the early 1950s with the introduction of mixed anhydrides (e.g. the Boc group).

Dibenzyl chlorophosphonate, promoted by Zervas for amino acid N- or O- phosphorylation

NPS-Cl used by Zervas to add the NPS group

Optically pure N-tritylamino acid prepared by Zervas

The disulfide bridges (yellow) between the two chains (orange and green) of insulin. Zervas developed methods for the controlled synthesis of such bridges.

Zervas continued his research on peptide synthesis in New York and later in Greece. The first topic of his research once in Greece was the synthesis of N- or O-phosphorylated amino acids, in which he demonstrated the utility of dibenzyl chlorophosphonate. He continued his efforts on the development of new methods within peptide chemistry, including the introduction of the o-nitrophenylsulfenyl (NPS) amino protecting group and peptide synthesis using N-tritylamino acids.

One of the major issues which occupied his interests was the chemical synthesis of insulin after its characterisation by Frederick Sanger (1951). The insulin peptide hormone features two protein chains cross-linked by disulfide bridges from cysteine thiols. For this reason, Zervas undertook a systematic study on asymmetric cysteine-containing peptides. In his attempts he introduced new mercaptan protecting groups (e.g. trityl, benzhydryl or benzoyl), which finally made it possible to produce disulfide bridges in a controlled manner. This was a triumph for peptide chemistry in the lab, but could not be possibly scaled to industrial procedures. Building on this work, the first complete synthesis of insulin was simultaneously achieved in 1963 in RWTH Aachen University by Helmut Zahn and in the University of Pittsburgh by Panayotis Katsoyannis, a student of Zervas. Further work on asymmetrical cysteine polypeptides was also done in Athens by Iphigenia Photaki, another student of his.

Overall, the research work of Zervas spans across six decades (1925–1979) and amounts to 96 publications in international chemistry journals.

== Honours and legacy ==
The scientific work of Leonidas Zervas had a global resonance and his contribution was recognised by multiple awards throughout his life. In 1960 he received an honorary doctorate from the University of Basel on the occasion of the university's 500th anniversary, upon recommendation of Hans Erlenmeyer and Nobel laureate Tadeusz Reichstein. In 1969 he was bestowed honorary membership of the American Society of Biological Chemists. In 1976 he was conferred the Order of Scientific Merit (1st class) by the Socialist Republic of Romania. In the same year Zervas was made Foreign Member of the USSR Academy of Sciences, an indication of the great respect for his work in the Eastern Bloc, too. The Max-Bergmann-Kreis company of German peptide chemists planned to present Zervas with the first Max Bergmann golden medal for peptide chemistry in 1980, but his sudden death necessitated a posthumous award ceremony.

In honour of Zervas, a commemorative bust has been unveiled in his birthtown Megalopolis in 1991 and the main conference hall of the National Hellenic Research Foundation is called the "Leonidas Zervas amphitheatre".

The European Peptide Society has established the Leonidas Zervas Award "in commemoration of his outstanding contributions to peptide science", awarded biennially since 1988. The award is given to the "scientist who has made the most outstanding contributions to the chemistry, biochemistry and/or biology of peptides in the five years preceding the date of selection".
