= Ambrein =

Names
- IUPAC name (1R,2R,4aS,8aS)-1-{(3E)-6-[(1S)-2,2-dimethyl-6-methylidenecyclohexyl]-4-methylhex-3-en-1-yl}-2,5,5,8a-tetramethyldecahydronaphthalen-2-ol
- Other names Ambrein

Identifiers
CAS Number	473-03-0
3D model (JSmol)	Interactive image; Interactive image
ChEBI	CHEBI:78306
ChemSpider	10000763
ECHA InfoCard	100.006.784
PubChem CID	11826112
UNII	1N9JB373FJ
CompTox Dashboard (EPA)	DTXSID00883390
- InChI: InChI=1S/C30H52O/c1-22(15-16-24-23(2)13-10-18-27(24,3)4)12-9-14-26-29(7)20-11-19-28(5,6)25(29)17-21-30(26,8)31/h12,24-26,31H,2,9-11,13-21H2,1,3-8H3/b22-12+/t24-,25?,26-,29+,30-/m1/s1 Key: BIADSXOKHZFLSN-CQDHYIGWSA-N; InChI=1/C30H52O/c1-22(15-16-24-23(2)13-10-18-27(24,3)4)12-9-14-26-29(7)20-11-19-28(5,6)25(29)17-21-30(26,8)31/h12,24-26,31H,2,9-11,13-21H2,1,3-8H3/b22-12+/t24-,25?,26-,29+,30-/m1/s1 Key: BIADSXOKHZFLSN-CQDHYIGWBE
- SMILES: C/C(=C\CC[C@@H]1[C@]2(CCCC(C2CC[C@@]1(C)O)(C)C)C)/CC[C@@H]3C(=C)CCCC3(C)C; O[C@@]1(CCC3[C@]([C@H]1CC\C=C(/C)CC[C@@H]2C(=C)\CCCC2(C)C)(C)CCCC3(C)C)C

Properties
Chemical formula	C_{30}H_{52}O
Molar mass	428.745 g·mol^{−1}
- Except where otherwise noted, data are given for materials in their standard state (at 25 °C [77 °F], 100 kPa). verify (what is ?) Infobox references

Ambrein is a triterpene alcohol that is the chief constituent of ambergris, a secretion from the digestive system of the sperm whale. It has been suggested as the possible active component producing the supposed aphrodisiac effects of ambergris. Although ambrein itself is odorless, it serves as the biological precursor for aromatic derivatives such as ambroxide and is thought to possess fixative properties for other odorants.

It has been shown to act as an analgesic and has been proven to increase sexual behavior in rats, providing some support for its traditional aphrodisiac use.

Apart from its supposed aphrodisiac effects, ambrein has been shown to decrease spontaneous contractions of smooth muscles in rats, guinea pigs, and rabbits. It reduces these contractions by serving as an antagonist and interfering with Ca^{2+} ions from outside the cell.

The aroma is described as (characteristically) ambergris, labdanum, amber, woody.

== Discovery ==
In 1946, Ruzicka and Lardon "established that the fragrance of ambergris is based on the triterpene (named) ambrein".

== Biosynthesis ==
Ambrein is synthesized from the common triterpenoid precursor squalene. The squalene-hopene cyclase (SHC) catalyzes the cyclization of squalene into the monocyclic 3-deoxyachilleol A. Tetraprenyl-beta-curcumene synthase (BmeTC) converts 3-deoxyachilleol A into the tricyclic ambrein.

Biosynthetic pathway of Ambrein
