= Růžička =

Růžička (Czech pronunciation: [ˈruːʒɪtʃka], feminine Růžičková) is a Czech surname. Ružička (feminine Ružičková) is a Slovak surname. It is a diminutive form of růže/ruža, meaning 'rose'. Notable people with the surname include:

- Adam Ružička (born 1999), Slovak ice hockey player
- Andrea Růžičková (born 1984), Slovak actress
- Antonín Růžička (born 1993), Czech ice hockey player
- Dan Růžička (born 1991), Czech ice hockey player
- David Růžička (born 1988), Czech ice hockey player
- Gayle Ruzicka (born c. 1943), American activist
- Hana Růžičková (1941–1981), Czech gymnast
- Helena Růžičková (1936–2004), Czech actress
- Jan Růžička (born 1997), Czech ice hockey player
- Jiří Růžička (basketball) (born 1941), Czech basketball player
- Jiří Růžička (politician) (born 1948), Czech politician
- Josef Růžička (1925–1986), Czech wrestler
- Karel Růžička (bobsledder) (1909–?), Czech bobsledder
- Karel Růžička (pianist) (1940–2016), Czech pianist
- Leopold Ružička (1887–1976), Hungarian-Croatian chemist
- Marek Růžička (born 1995), Czech ice hockey player
- Marie Růžičková, Slovak basketball player
- Marla Ruzicka (1976–2005), American activist and aid worker
- Martin Růžička (born 1985), Czech ice hockey player
- Martina Růžičková (born 1980), Czech cyclist
- Miroslav Růžička (born 1959), Czech sport shooter
- Nils Ruzicka (born 1973), German record producer
- Peter Ruzicka (born 1948), German composer
- Peter Ružička (1947–2003), Slovak computer scientist
- Peter Arne Ruzicka (born 1964), Norwegian businessman
- Rudolph Ruzicka (1883–1978), Czech-born American illustrator and book designer
- Štefan Ružička (born 1985), Slovak ice hockey player
- Věra Růžičková (1928–2018), Czech gymnast
- Viktor Růžička (1943–2013), Czech cinematographer
- Vladimír Růžička (born 1963), Czech ice hockey player and coach
- Vladimír Růžička (ice hockey, born 1989), Czech ice hockey player
- Werner Ruzicka (born 1943), German boxer
- Zdeněk Růžička (1925–2021), Czech gymnast
- Zuzana Růžičková (1927–2017), Czech harpsichordist

== Other ==
- Ruzicka (TV series), a Canadian television series
