= Klaus H. Hofmann =

American chemist (1911 - 1995)

Klaus H Hofmann
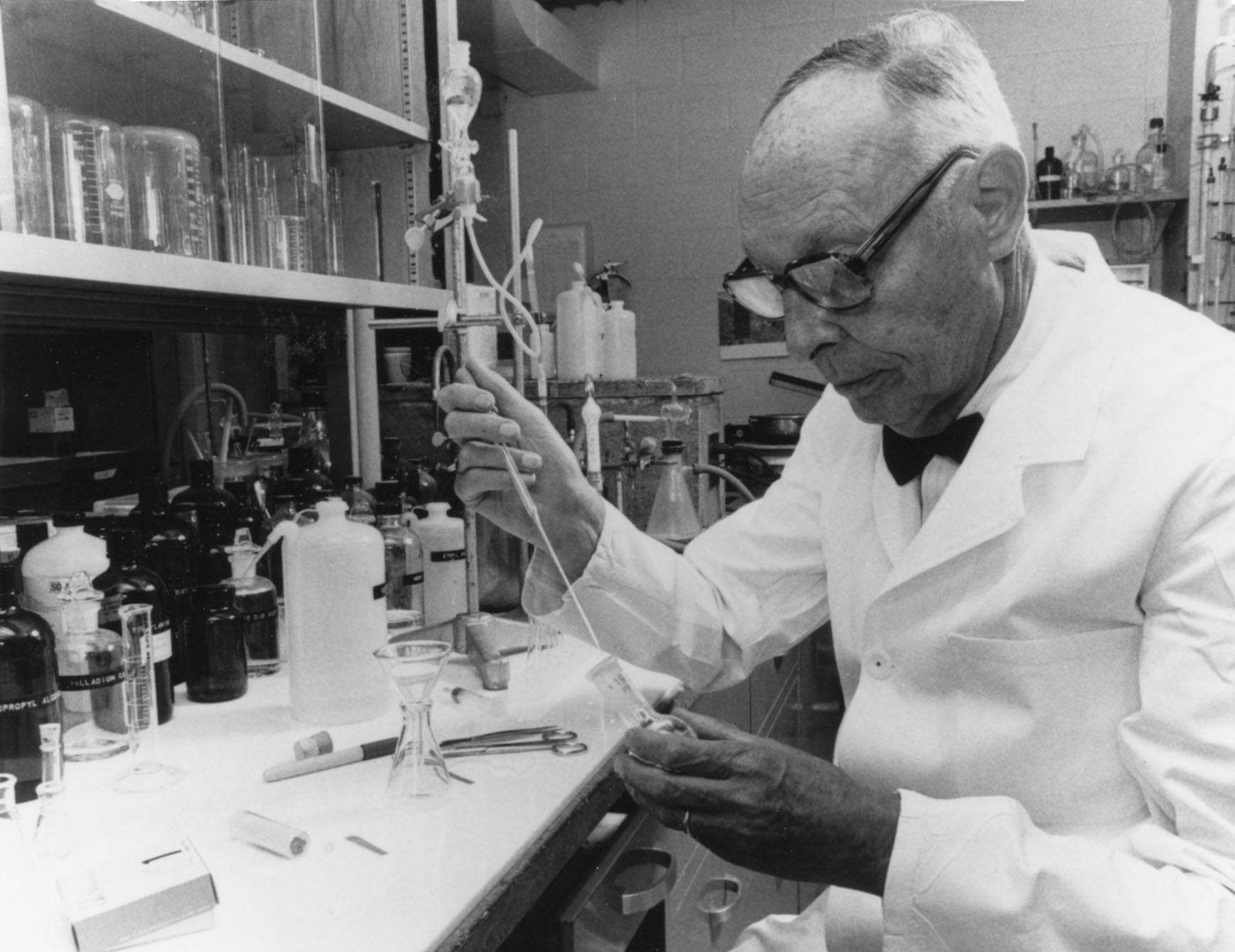
- Hofmann in his laboratory at the University of Pittsburgh, c. 1990
- Born: February 21, 1911; Karlsruhe, Germany
- Died: December 25, 1995; Pittsburgh, Pennsylvania, U.S.

Klaus H. Hofmann (February 21, 1911 – December 25, 1995) was an American biological chemist and medical researcher. The New York Times called Hofmann an "expert on synthesis of body compounds". His career was highlighted by synthesis of a prototype birth control pill, isolation and structural characterization of biotin (vitamin H), determination of the lysine specificity of the pancreatic protease trypsin (an attribute that made it the enzyme of first choice in protein sequence determinations), the first chemical synthesis of a fully biologically-active portion of the peptide hormone (adrenocorticotopic hormone - ACTH), and structure-function studies on ribonuclease (RNase).

== Early life and entry to science ==
Hofmann was born in Germany but when his father died, his mother returned with her one-year-old son to her family home in Switzerland. The family was business oriented but Klaus was determined to pursue a career in science. He studied steroid chemistry at the Federal Institute of Technology in Zürich (ETH) in the laboratories of Leopold Ružička. Here he developed a friendship with another faculty member, Tadeus Reichstein from whom he learned laboratory technique. For his postdoctoral experience he traveled to the United States to work with Max Bergmann on peptides, an entirely new field for him. From there he migrated across the street to the laboratory of Vincent du Vigneaud where he was introduced to a new vitamin, Biotin.

== The war years ==
What was meant to be a short stay in the US turned into a much longer one as a result of World War II. Switzerland, ringed by hostile forces, advised Hofmann, an officer in the Swiss militia, not to return for the course of the war. He spent the war years working as a guest at Ciba Pharmaceutical Company in New Jersey. From there he moved to the University of Pittsburgh at a time when the institution was trying to build a research reputation.

== A scientific home in Pittsburgh ==
In a few short years, the Dean of the School of Medicine, himself a professor of Biochemistry, invited Hofmann to become Chairman of the Department. From the moment he took the position of Chairman of Biochemistry, it became clear that although he would always be a son of Switzerland, the United States offered him career opportunities he could never hope for in a small country like Switzerland. The US was to become his permanent home. The burgeoning field of peptide chemistry became his scientific focus and, in his own words, he fell in love with a molecule that was known to stimulate the adrenal cortex to produce the very steroids that had so fascinated him in Reichstein's laboratory. That molecule, not yet isolated, was ACTH and the love affair was lifelong. Despite detours into other areas, he kept returning to ACTH. In the last years before his death, he was developing methods to isolate the ACTH receptor.

== Areas of scientific accomplishments ==
=== Steroid Chemistry ===
As a PhD student in the laboratories of future Nobel Laureates, Leopold Ruzicka and Tadeus Reichstein in Zürich, Hofmann synthesized a number of compounds related to terpenes, the hypothetical building block of steroids. One of these was a dehydroandrosterone derivative, a prototype for the birth control pill. Unfortunately the biological basis for reproduction was not known for many years subsequent to this and therefore the importance of this compound was not recognized.

=== Trypsin ===
While working in the laboratory of Max Bergmann at Rockefeller Institute, now Rockefeller University, Hofmann synthesized analogs of the amino acid lysine and proved that the enzyme trypsin cleaves linkages involving the carboxyl group of that amino acid.

=== Biotin ===
Subsequently, with Vincent du Vigneaud, he used the newly developed technique of chromatography that he had learned while a student in Zürich, to isolate and then crystallize biotin. This work began a theme that continued throughout his career of determining the importance of sulfur in biologically active structures. He applied this to peptides as well.

=== Peptide synthesis/ACTH ===
The first chemical synthesis of an active peptide hormone, the nine amino acid cyclic peptide, oxytocin, was achieved in 1954 by du Vigneaud for which he was awarded the Nobel Prize. At the same time, the isolation and structure determination of the anterior pituitary hormone, ACTH, was being pursued in three laboratories. The peptide was eventually determined to be 39 amino acids in length, however enzymatic and mild acid cleavage suggested that a structure comprising only the first 24 amino acids had full biological activity. It was apparent from the outset that ACTH contained the amino acid Arginine and thus methods had to be developed for the incorporation of this basic amino acid into peptides. Hofmann and his group set about this task. Their efforts led to the synthesis of the melanocyte stimulating hormone, β-MSH, which corresponds to the first 13 amino acids of ACTH and to the synthesis of a fully active ACTH peptide corresponding to the amino acid sequence of the first 23 amino acids.

In the course of the peptide synthetic work on ACTH, a novel chain cleavage was observed at an acyl-proline linkage while removing protecting groups using metallic sodium in liquid ammonia. This unexpected reaction has subsequently proved useful in special analytical cases.

=== RNaseA ===
In 1959, Fred Richards discovered that a proteolytic enzyme, Subtilisin, had the ability to cleave the enzyme Ribonuclease A into two components, a peptide corresponding to the first 20 amino acids of the enzyme (S-Peptide) and the remainder of the protein (S-Protein). When separated from one another, each piece was inactive but when they were simply mixed together, full enzymatic activity was restored. Hofmann speculated that this system might be a model for the way peptide hormones interact with their receptors. Structure-function studies with ACTH were complicated by the necessity to assess activity in the whole animal. The S-Peptide:S-Protein system afforded a simple system with none of the biological complications inherent in testing ACTH analogs.

To study which amino acids might be important in establishing the binding between peptide hormones and their receptors, Hofmann and his group began a systematic evaluation of the contributions each amino acid in the S-Peptide molecule made to the binding with S-Protein. The ability of synthetic analogs of S-Peptide to activate S-Protein correlated well with those of synthetic ACTH analogs to elicit hormonal activity: 1) only a portion of the S-Peptide chain was essential for re-establishing full activity with the S-Protein; 2) methionine was not important; 3) substituting one particular amino acid in the peptide not only destroyed the activity of the peptide but created an antagonist as well. Once it was established that peptide hormone receptors resided on the plasma membrane of cells, direct studies of the activity of ACTH derivatives that had so long eluded researchers finally became a reality. Hofmann and his colleagues isolated plasma membranes from beef adrenals and were able to conduct structure-activity studies with synthetic analogs of ACTH. Importantly they found that substituting Phenylalanine for theTryptophan residue in position 9 produced a peptide that bound to the ACTH receptor without activating it, i.e. and ACTH antagonist.

=== Return to Biotin receptor isolation ===
Hofmann came full circle to his early work on biotin when he attached this vitamin to insulin. He spent a sabbatical leave in Aachen in Helmut Zahn's laboratory to learn techniques for modifying insulin). Using this information, he was able to chemically attach biotin to one of the three Lys residues of the insulin chains, thus producing an insulin that would bind to columns of avidin-Sepharose. The biotinyl-insulin receptor complex could then be displaced by biotin. With this tool, Hofmann and his coworkers successfully isolated a fully active insulin receptor. His final work was directed toward isolation of the ACTH receptor using the same approach used on the insulin receptor but by this time his health was in decline.

== Distinctions ==
Hofmann was the founder and the director of Protein Research Laboratory at the School of Medicine at University of Pittsburgh, a member of the National Academy of Sciences, Professor Emeritus of Experimental Medicine and Biochemistry at the University of Pittsburgh School of Medicine, and a member of American Association for the Advancement of Science.

== Awards and distinctions ==
Hofmann was a member of:

- American Association for the Advancement of Science
- American Chemical Society
- American Society for Biochemistry and Molecular Biology
- Endocrine Society
- National Academy of Sciences
- Sigma XI
- Swiss Chemical Society

Hofmann was recognized with the following awards:

- 1962 Pittsburgh Award
- 1963 Election to membership in the National Academy of Sciences
- 1963 Borden Medal
- 1963 Chancellors Medal, University of Pittsburgh
- 1972 Mellon Lecture, University of Pittsburgh
- 1976 Senior Scientist Award, Alexander Von Humboldt Foundation, Bonn, West Germany
- 1981 Third Alan E. Pierce Award by the American Peptide Chemists
- 1983 Japan Society for the Promotion of Sciences Fellowship Award
- 1987 First Huggins Memorial Award, University of Pittsburgh
