= Sclareol =

Names
- IUPAC name Labd-14-ene-8,13-diol
- Systematic IUPAC name (1R,2R,4aS,8aS)-1-[(3R)-3-Hydroxy-3-methylpent-4-en-1-yl]-2,5,5,8a-tetramethyldecahydronaphthalen-2-ol

Identifiers
CAS Number	515-03-7
3D model (JSmol)	Interactive image
ChEBI	CHEBI:9053
ChemSpider	143282
ECHA InfoCard	100.007.450
KEGG	C09183
PubChem CID	163263
UNII	B607NP0Q8Y
CompTox Dashboard (EPA)	DTXSID0047111
- InChI: InChI=1S/C20H36O2/c1-7-18(4,21)13-9-16-19(5)12-8-11-17(2,3)15(19)10-14-20(16,6)22/h7,15-16,21-22H,1,8-14H2,2-6H3/t15-,16+,18-,19-,20+/m0/s1 Key: XVULBTBTFGYVRC-HHUCQEJWSA-N; InChI=1/C20H36O2/c1-7-18(4,21)13-9-16-19(5)12-8-11-17(2,3)15(19)10-14-20(16,6)22/h7,15-16,21-22H,1,8-14H2,2-6H3/t15-,16+,18-,19-,20+/m0/s1 Key: XVULBTBTFGYVRC-HHUCQEJWBX
- SMILES: CC1(C)CCC[C@@]2(C)[C@@]1([H])CC[C@@](C)(O)[C@@H]2CC[C@](O)(C)C=C

Properties
Chemical formula	C_{20}H_{36}O_{2}
Molar mass	308.506 g·mol^{−1}
Melting point	95.6 to 98.7 °C (204.1 to 209.7 °F; 368.8 to 371.8 K)
- Except where otherwise noted, data are given for materials in their standard state (at 25 °C [77 °F], 100 kPa). verify (what is ?) Infobox references

Sclareol is a fragrant chemical compound found in Salvia sclarea, from which it derives its name. It is classified as a bicyclic diterpene alcohol having roles in plant growth, development, defense, and attraction of pollinators.

It is an amber-colored solid with a sweet, herbaceous, balsamic scent used as a fragrance in perfume manufacturing, and as a flavoring agent. Sclareol is the most common starting material for manufacturing ambroxide (tradenames, Ambrox or Ambroxan), which is used as a fixative in commercial perfumes.

Sclareol is also extracted from the flowers of Cistus creticus, Nicotiana glutinosa, and Cleome spinosa.

== Plant synthesis and function ==
Sclareol is mainly produced in the glandular trichomes of sage flower calyces. It is formed via a methylerythritol-phosphate biosynthetic pathway.

As a diterpene, sclareol is among thousands of natural compounds existing in plants with roles in plant growth, development, and interactions with other organisms, such as attraction of pollinators or defense against pathogens and pests.

== Manufacturing ==
Sclareol is a component of Salvia plants spread widely around the world, particularly in the Mediterranean basin and Western Asia where the plants and sclareol are harvested and exploited for their earthy aromatic properties.

Sclareol is extracted by steam distillation of fresh flowers, then purified by further extraction using an organic solvent. Sclareol is applied in the commercial synthesis of ambroxide.

As of 2021, genetic enhancement of plants producing sclareol was under study for improving yields in fragrance and flavor manufacturing.
