= GAEC =

GAEC may refer to:

- Gafat Armament Engineering Complex, a military production facility of the Ethiopian Defense Industry
- Ghana Atomic Energy Commission
- Greek Atomic Energy Commission
