= Ambergris =

Substance produced in the digestive system of sperm whales

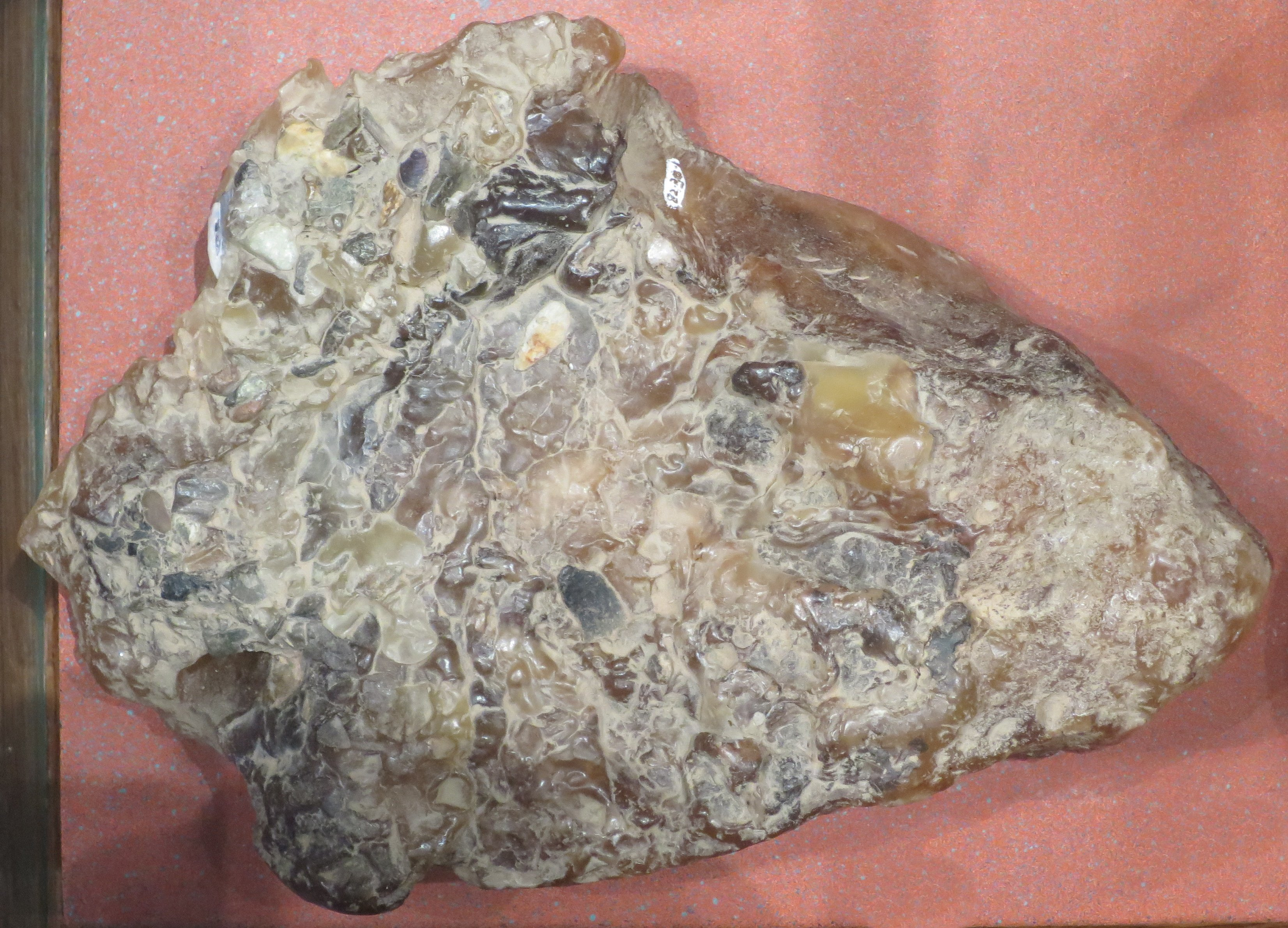
Ambergris in dried form

Ambergris (/ˈæmbərɡrɪs/ or /ˈæmbərɡriːs/; Latin: ambra grisea; Old French: ambre gris), ambergrease, or grey amber is a solid, waxy, flammable substance of a dull grey or blackish colour produced in the digestive system of sperm whales. Freshly produced ambergris has a marine, fecal odour. It acquires a sweet, earthy scent as it ages, commonly likened to the fragrance of isopropyl alcohol without the vaporous chemical astringency.

Ambergris has been highly valued by perfume makers as a fixative that allows the scent to last much longer, although it has been mostly replaced by synthetic ambroxide. It is sometimes used in cooking.

Dogs are attracted to the smell of ambergris and are sometimes used by ambergris searchers.

== Etymology ==
The English word amber derives from Arabic ʿanbar (عَنْبَر) via Middle Latin ambar, and Middle French ambre to be adopted in Middle English in the 14th century.

The word ambergris comes from the Old French ambre gris or 'grey amber'. The addition of "grey" came about when, in the Romance languages, the sense of the word "amber" was extended to Baltic amber (fossil resin), as white or yellow amber (ambre jaune), from as early as the late 13th century. This fossilised resin subsequently became the dominant (and now exclusive) sense of "amber", leaving "ambergris" as the word for the whale secretion.

The archaic alternate spelling "ambergrease" arose as an eggcorn from the phonetic pronunciation of "ambergris", encouraged by the substance's waxy texture.

== Formation ==
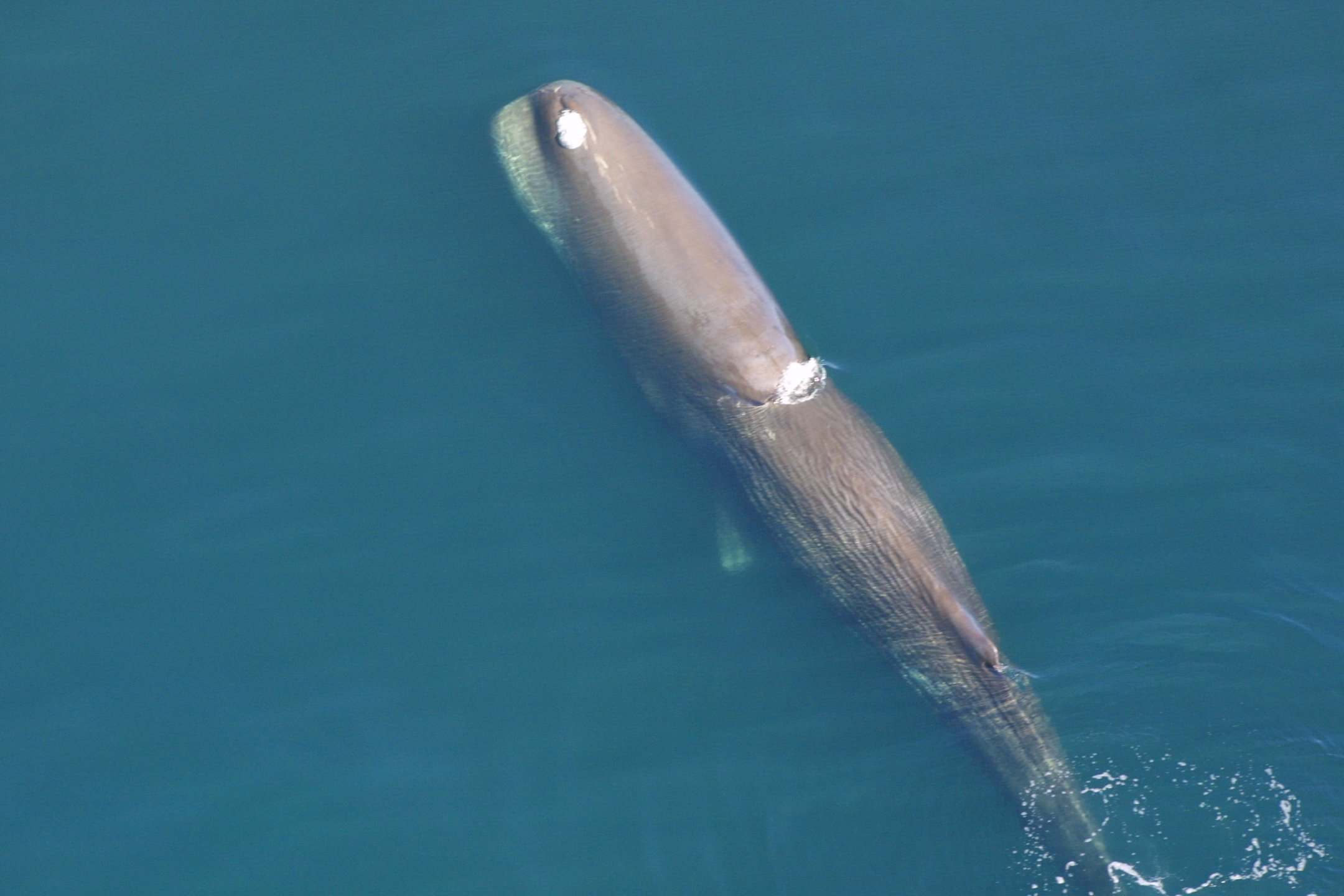
Ambergris is created in the biliary secretions of sperm whales.

Ambergris is formed from a secretion of the bile duct in the intestines of the sperm whale, and can be found floating on the sea or washed up on coastlines. It is sometimes found in the abdomens of dead sperm whales. Because the beaks of giant squids have been discovered within lumps of ambergris, scientists have suggested that the substance is produced by the whale's gastrointestinal tract to ease the passage of hard, sharp objects that it may have eaten.

Ambergris is passed like faecal matter. It is speculated that an ambergris mass too large to be passed through the intestines is expelled via the mouth, but this remains under debate. Another theory states that an ambergris mass is formed when the colon of a whale is enlarged by a blockage from intestinal worms and cephalopod parts resulting in the death of the whale and the mass being excreted into the sea. Ambergris takes years to form. It is only produced by sperm whales, and only by an estimated one percent of them. Ambergris is rare; once expelled by a whale, it often floats for years before making landfall. The slim chances of finding ambergris and the legal ambiguity involved led perfume makers away from ambergris, and led chemists to find viable alternatives.

Ambergris is found primarily in the Atlantic Ocean and on the coasts of South Africa; Brazil; Madagascar; the East Indies; The Maldives; China; Japan; India; Australia; New Zealand; and the Molucca Islands. Most commercially collected ambergris comes from the Bahamas in the Atlantic, particularly New Providence. In 2021, fishermen found a 127 kg (280-pound) piece of ambergris off the coast of Yemen, valued at US$1.5 million. Fossilised ambergris from 1.75 million years ago has also been found.

== Physical properties ==
Ambergris is found in lumps of various shapes and sizes, usually weighing from 15 grams (1/2 ounce) to 50 kilograms (110 pounds) or more. When initially expelled by or removed from the whale, the fatty precursor of ambergris is pale white in colour (sometimes streaked with black), soft, with a strong faecal smell. Following months to years of photodegradation and oxidation in the ocean, this precursor gradually hardens, developing a dark grey or black colour, a crusty and waxy texture, and a peculiar odour that is at once sweet, earthy, marine, and animalic. Its scent has been generally described as a vastly richer and smoother version of isopropanol without its stinging harshness. In this developed condition, ambergris has a specific gravity ranging from 0.780 to 0.926 (meaning it floats in water). It melts at about 62 °C (144 °F) to a fatty, yellow resinous liquid; and at 100 °C (212 °F) it is volatilised into a white vapour. It is soluble in ether, and in volatile and fixed oils.

== Chemical properties ==
Ambergris is relatively nonreactive to acid. White crystals of a terpenoid known as ambrein, discovered by Leopold Ružička and Fernand Lardon in 1946, can be separated from ambergris by heating raw ambergris in alcohol, then allowing the resulting solution to cool. Breakdown of the relatively scentless ambrein through oxidation produces ambroxide and ambrinol, the main odour components of ambergris.

Ambrein

Ambroxide

Ambrinol

Ambroxide is now produced synthetically and used extensively in the perfume industry.

== Applications ==
Ambergris has been mostly known for its use in creating perfume and fragrance much like musk. Perfumes based on ambergris still exist. The aroma is described as (characteristically) ambergris, animal, marine, seashore. Ambergris has historically been used in food and drink. A serving of eggs and ambergris was reportedly King Charles II of England's favourite dish. A recipe for Rum Shrub liqueur from the mid 19th century called for a thread of ambergris to be added to rum, almonds, cloves, cassia, and the peel of oranges in making a cocktail from The English and Australian Cookery Book. It has been used as a flavouring agent in Turkish coffee and in hot chocolate in 18th century Europe. The substance is considered an aphrodisiac in some cultures.

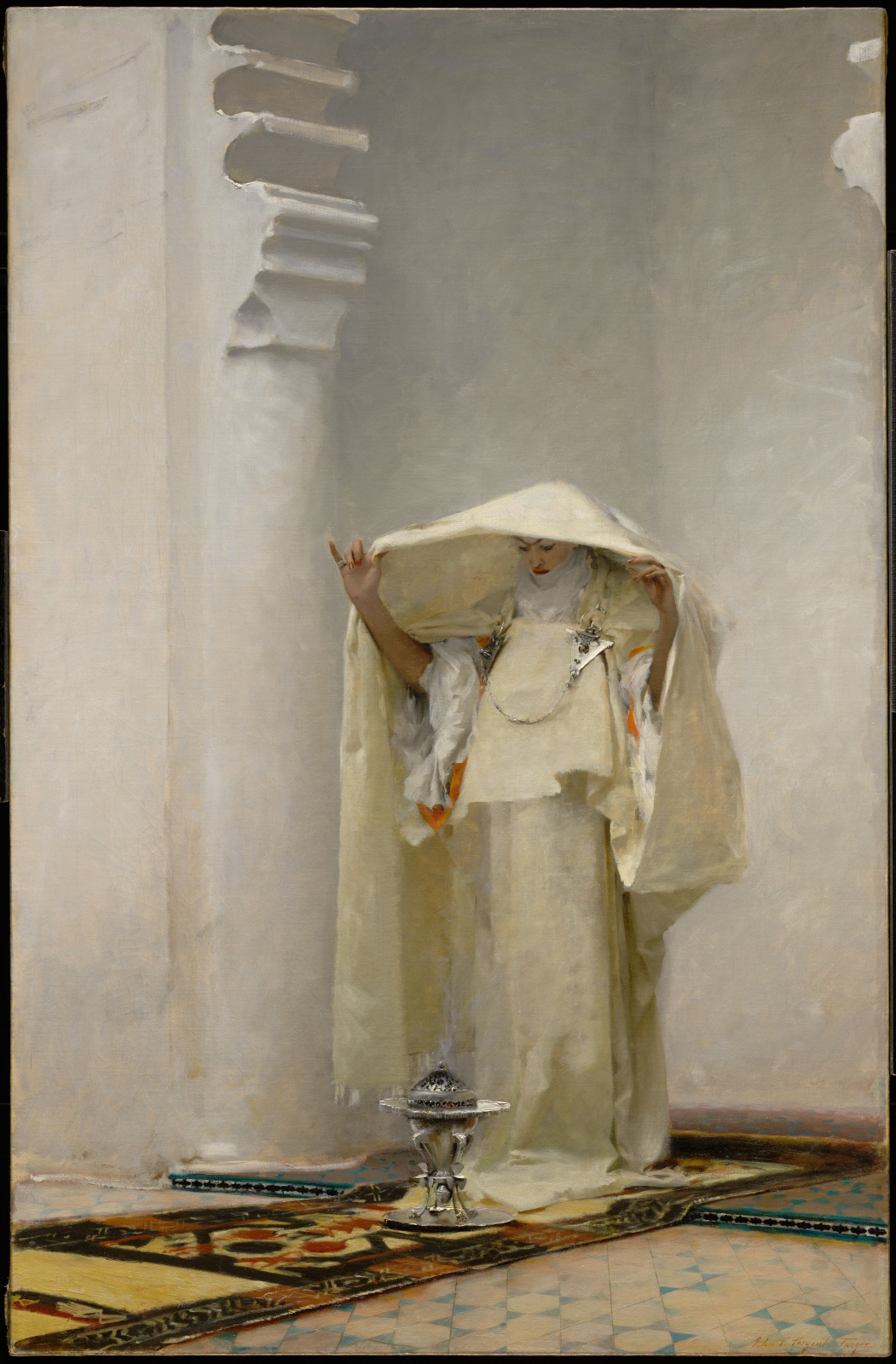
Fumée d'Ambre Gris by John Singer Sargent

Ancient Egyptians burned ambergris as incense, while in modern Egypt ambergris is used for scenting cigarettes. Use as an incense can be seen in the John Singer Sargent painting Fumée d'Ambre Gris, painted in Tangiers and Paris in 1880.

The ancient Chinese called the substance "dragon's spittle fragrance". During the Black Death in Europe, people believed that carrying a ball of ambergris could help prevent them from contracting plague. This was because the fragrance covered the smell of the air which was believed to be a cause of plague.

During the Middle Ages, Europeans used ambergris as a medication for headaches, colds, epilepsy, and other ailments.

In New Zealand, ambergris found washed up on the shores was used by Māori as chewing gum in pre-colonial times. It was known as mīmiha.

== Legality ==
From the 18th to the mid-19th century, the whaling industry prospered. By some reports, nearly 50,000 whales, including sperm whales, were killed each year. Throughout the 19th century, "millions of whales were killed for their oil, whalebone, and ambergris" to fuel profits, and they soon became endangered as a species as a result. Because studies showed that the whale populations were being threatened, the International Whaling Commission instituted a moratorium on commercial whaling in 1982. Although ambergris is not harvested from whales, many countries also ban the trade of ambergris as part of the more general ban on the hunting and exploitation of whales.

Urine, faeces, and ambergris (that has been naturally excreted by a sperm whale) are waste products not considered parts or derivatives of a CITES species and are therefore not covered by the provisions of the convention.

Countries where ambergris trade is illegal include:

- Australia – Under federal law, the export and import of ambergris for commercial purposes is banned by the Environment Protection and Biodiversity Conservation Act 1999. The various states and territories have additional laws regarding ambergris.
- United States – The possession and trade of ambergris is prohibited by the Endangered Species Act of 1973.
- India – Sale or possession is illegal under the Wild Life (Protection) Act, 1972.

Countries where trade of ambergris is legal include:

- The United Kingdom
- Member states of the European Union
- Switzerland
- Maldives
