= Ambroxide =

Chemical compound

Names
- Preferred IUPAC name (3aR,5aS,9aS,9bR)-3a,6,6,9a-Tetramethyldodecahydronaphtho[2,1-b]furan
- Other names Ambrox (Firmenich); Ambrofix (Givaudan); Ambroxan (Kao); Ambermox; Ambermor; Orcanox (3aR-(3aα,5aβ,9aα,9bβ))-Dodecahydro-3a,6,6,9a-tetra-methylnaphtho(2,1-b)furan; Naphtho(2,1-b)furan, dodecahydro-3a,6,6,9a-tetramethyl-,; 8α, 12-Oxido-13,14,15,16-tetranorlabdane; 1,5,5,9-Tetramethyl-13-oxatricyclo(8.3.0.0(4,9))tridecane

Identifiers
CAS Number	6790-58-5; 3738-00-9 (unspecified stereochemistry)
3D model (JSmol)	Interactive image
ChEBI	CHEBI:78307
ChEMBL	ChEMBL496447
ChemSpider	9032756
ECHA InfoCard	100.027.147
EC Number	229-861-2
PubChem CID	10857465
UNII	K60YJF1E9A
CompTox Dashboard (EPA)	DTXSID0047113
- InChI: InChI=1S/C16H28O/c1-14(2)8-5-9-15(3)12(14)6-10-16(4)13(15)7-11-17-16/h12-13H,5-11H2,1-4H3/t12-,13+,15-,16+/m0/s1 Key: YPZUZOLGGMJZJO-LQKXBSAEBI; InChI=1S/C16H28O/c1-14(2)8-5-9-15(3)12(14)6-10-16(4)13(15)7-11-17-16/h12-13H,5-11H2,1-4H3/t12-,13+,15-,16+/m0/s1
- SMILES: CC1(CCC[C@]2([C@H]1CC[C@@]3([C@@H]2CCO3)C)C)C

Properties
Chemical formula	C_{16}H_{28}O
Molar mass	236.399 g·mol^{−1}
Density	0.939 g/cm^{3}
Melting point	75 °C (167 °F; 348 K)
Boiling point	120 °C (248 °F; 393 K) (1.40 mm Hg)
Solubility in water	insoluble
Solubility in ethanol	soluble
Refractive index (n_{D})	1.48

Hazards
Flash point	161 °C (322 °F; 434 K)
- Except where otherwise noted, data are given for materials in their standard state (at 25 °C [77 °F], 100 kPa). (what is ?) Infobox references

Ambroxide, widely known by the brand name Ambroxan, is a naturally occurring terpenoid and one of the key constituents responsible for the odor of ambergris. It is an autoxidation product of ambrein. Ambroxide is used in perfumery for creating ambergris notes and as a fixative. Ambroxide has a scent with woody, musky and slightly salty nuances. Small amounts (< 0.01 ppm) are used as a flavoring in food. The FDA has approved the addition of ambroxide to food as a flavoring agent.

The aroma is described as (characteristically) ambergris, sweet, labdanum, dry, woody, pine, cedar, green, and seedy.

Ambroxide is highly tenacious and substantive. It clings to skin, fabric, and hard surfaces and persists for many hours, which is the basis of its role as a fixative. These properties make the molecule valuable both as a featured ingredient and as a behind-the-scenes performance booster. The most prominent use of ambroxide is in fine fragrance, where it serves simultaneously as a base note and a fixative.

== Synthesis ==
Ambroxide is synthesized from sclareol, a component of the essential oil of clary sage. Sclareol is oxidatively degraded to a lactone, which is hydrogenated to the corresponding diol. The resulting compound is dehydrated to form ambroxide.

Conversion of sclareol to ambroxide

While sclareol has been the historical method of synthesis of ambroxide, a new patented method was discovered that uses (3E,7E)-4,8,12-trimethyltrideca-3,7,11-trien-1-ol (Homofarnesol) [459-89-2] as the raw material. This process was stated to require 100 times less agricultural surface than the traditional method from clary sage. The last step involves a polyene cyclization that is comparible to the process of squalene in the synthesis of steroids.
