= Moses Wolf Goldberg =

Estonian chemist (1905–1964)

- Born: June 30, 1905; Rūjiena, Governorate of Livonia (present-day Latvia)
- Died: February 17, 1964 (aged 58); Montclair, New Jersey
- Known for: Biotin synthesis and development of other pharmaceuticals
- Awards: Werner Medal and Werner Prize of the Swiss Chemical Society (1940)
- Scientific career
- Fields: Chemistry
- Doctoral advisor: Leopold Ružička

Moses Wolf Goldberg (June 30, 1905 – February 17, 1964) was an Estonian chemist who, along with Leo Henryk Sternbach, developed a process for the synthesis of biotin (a B vitamin) in 1949.

== Biography ==
Moses Wolf Goldberg was born in Rūjiena, Latvia in 1905 and moved to Võru, Estonia as a young child. Goldberg attended the German Oberrealschule in Tartu and studied science and mathematics at the University of Tartu from 1923 to 1924. He then enrolled at ETH Zurich, where he earned a Diploma in Chemical Engineering. He did his doctoral work under Nobel Prize winner Leopold Ružička and was a colleague of other notable chemists, including Tadeus Reichstein, Leo Henryk Sternbach, and George Rosenkranz. In 1931, he submitted a doctoral thesis entitled Versuche zur Synthese Ephedrin-ähnlicher Körper (Assay for Synthesis of an Ephedrine-Like Body) and earned the Habilitation degree in 1935 despite increasing xenophobia at the institution. In 1940, Goldberg was awarded the Werner Medal and Werner Prize of the Swiss Chemical Society.

Due to the increasingly unwelcoming climate for Jews in Europe, in 1942 Goldberg emigrated to the United States along with many other Jewish scientists fleeing the Nazis. He took a position with Hoffmann-La Roche at the company's Nutley, New Jersey facility. With Leo Sternbach, Goldberg patented a process for synthesizing biotin in 1949. He obtained numerous other patents while working for Hoffmann-La Roche, identifying and refining antibiotics and other drugs.

Goldberg died at the age of 58 in February, 1964.

== Family ==
Moses Wolf Goldberg was the son of Meyer Itzik Goldberg and Kayla Hanna Gibberman. His parents were born in Bauska, Latvia, and they married in Riga in 1904. He had a younger brother, Leo (b. 1907), who also studied at the University of Tartu, and a sister Miriam (b. 1909). His father Meyer Itzik Goldberg was deported to Siberia, and died or was killed in the SevUralLag camp in December 1941. His mother Kayla Hanna Goldberg and sister-in-law Erna Furman Goldberg (Leo's wife) were deported to Nedostupny, in the Tomsk region of Siberia, and probably perished there. His sister Miriam and her husband Leo Klionski fled with other Jewish refugees to Tashkent, Uzbekistan; Leo Klionski survived the war and returned to Estonia, but it is unclear what happened to Miriam. Leo Goldberg was not deported in 1941, and his fate is unknown.

Moses Wolf Goldberg married Regina Hauser in Switzerland around 1928, and they emigrated together in January 1942 along with Regina's mother Ida Hauser. They had no children.
