= National Hellenic Research Foundation =

Greek research institute

Coordinates: 37°58′25.1″N 23°44′43.9″E

National Hellenic Research Foundation (Εθνικό Ίδρυμα Ερευνών)
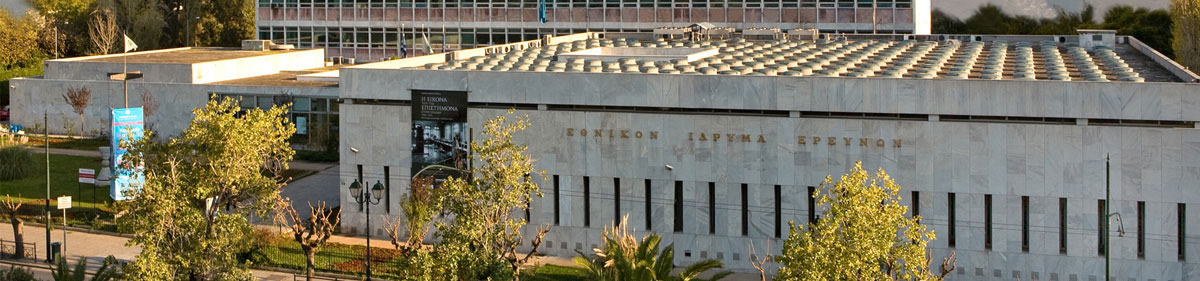
- Established: 1958
- Director: Professor Dimosthenis Sarigiannis
- Staff: 450
- Location: Athens, Greece
- Website: www.eie.gr

The National Hellenic Research Foundation (NHRF; Greek: Εθνικό Ίδρυμα Ερευνών (Ε.Ι.Ε.)) is a non-profit, private-law legal entity established in 1958 with the aim of conducting interdisciplinary research in the fields of science and the humanities. It is supervised by the General Secretariat for Research and Technology (GSRT) of the Ministry of Development and Investment (Greece). (ISSN 1790-3572)

It consists of three research institutes, one in the field of Humanities (Institute of Historical Research) and two in the field of Science (Institute of Chemical Biology and Institute of Theoretical and Theoretical Sciences). The National Research Foundation also owns the Library of Science, Technology and Culture "K.H. Dimaras", which has served the Greek scientific community as a whole since its founding in 1958. Professor Dimosthenis Sarigiannis is the Director and Chairman of the Board at the National Hellenic Research Foundation.

== History ==
=== Establishment ===
The National Research Foundation was founded on 10 October 1958 under the name "Royal Research Foundation" by Royal Decree of 9 October 1958. The purpose of the establishment was to enhance the scientific research carried out in Greece and to provide more opportunities for creative research by Greek scientists. After the war, the palace attempted to establish basic social welfare and education institutions with the aim of legal, political and social prosperity and the social development of Greece. At the same time it seeks to justify and promote the royal institution. Scientific research up to that time was carried out by universities and the Academy of Athens, so the most important efforts outside the NHRF were the establishment of the Greek Atomic Energy Commission (1954) and later "Democritos" (1961).

=== Background information ===
In 1947, the Palace in Greece, represented by the successor to the royal throne Paul, founded the Royal National Foundation with the aim of undertaking various educational activities. It included palace officials, bank and chamber executives and prominent public figures. At that time conditions in America and Europe were favorable for scientific research, while Greek scientists abroad were calling for the organization of scientific institutions in Greece, which would encourage their repatriation and enhance domestic research. Yiangos Pesmazoglou envisioned the development of research in Greece during his university years at Harvard. Moreover, he played a key role when he was General Director at the Ministry of Coordination (1951-1955). He moved in that direction when he set up the Bank of Greece's Directorate of Economic Studies in 1955 for the purpose of preparing financial studies. In 1958, Pesmazoglou met King Paul and presented his ideas for setting up a research center. The second person to share these ideas was Konstantinos Th. Dimaras, General Director at the Ministry of Coordination in 1951 and General Director at the State Scholarship Foundation (ΙΚΥ). Another contributor to this effort was Charalambos Potamianos, a deputy commander, former aide to the king and also a member of the administration of the Royal National Foundation. Furthermore, the participation of Leonidas Zervas, a professor of organic chemistry at the University of Athens and then a visiting researcher in the U.S., was important. Pesmazoglou corresponded with Zervas and sent him drafts of the foundation's Organization and Zervas replied with his observations. Pesmazoglou tells him that the "Kaiser Wilhelm Institut" and the "Center de la Reaserhe Scientifique" are modeled on. Among those wishing to participate were Xenophon Zolotas, Konstantinos Dimaras, Caesar Alexopoulos, Ioannis Saregiannis and Evangelos Papanoutsos. Pesmazoglou was also in touch with Waldemar Nielsen, a spokesman for the Ford Foundation, with the aim of financially supporting the establishment. The proposed original name of the institution was "Hellenic Royal Institute of Postgraduate Research". Zervas chose the name "Scientific Research Foundation" to indicate there were no educational goals, but its main role was to promote original scientific research. Over time, it will be able to set up its own research institutes.

From April to early summer of 1958, messages about funding from American institutions (Ford and Rockefeller) were positive: the first was considering approving $50,000 a year for five years, while the U.S. Mission was considering paying the amount of 100,000,000 drachmas and 50,000,000 drachmas more in the coming years. "Institutions and official America have begun to understand that the survival of the free world will not be ensured by the attraction and settlement in America of all prominent scientists, but by the encouragement of local scientists in their own countries." On October 10, 1958, the American ambassador visited King Paul and handed him a letter announcing the donation of 100,000,000 drachmas. The money was invested by the Board of Directors of foundation on PPC (Greek Public Power Corporation) bonds with yields of approximately 8,000,000 drachmas and from 1963 to 1967 buying stores in Athens and Piraeus.

=== The building ===
Initially, a plot of 8,000 m^{2} was allocated on Rigillis and Vassileos Georgiou Street, near the Athens Conservatory. This building block was behind the Athens Club of Officers. In the 1950 Athens city map the area was called Lyceum (Λύκειον). In 1959, the foundation first launched a national competition called "The Royal Research Foundation Building". Eventually the competition did not take place, since a plot was chosen on the opposite side of "Vasileos Constantinou" street, eleven acres. As it was situated on the outskirts of ancient Athens and the modern Greek capital, it was of semantic interest, given that the country's central and also the most important institution was in the heart of the state. The building block chosen was the stable of the Evzonean guard and its parking lot. It was surrounded by "Vasileos Georgiou", "Vasileos Konstantinou", "Rizari", and "Pavlou Mela" avenues, but it was never opened. The foundation's Board of Directors entrusted the study of the buildings to Dimitris Pikionis and Konstantinos Doxiadis. The reason for the direct assignment was that Zervas and Dimaras had proposed to undertake the study a mixed group of architects: three well-known and distinguished and three young people of the best. Doxiadis also promised a 10 to 15% reduction in pay. The project was estimated at 50 million drachmas: 1m the consultant, 25m the construction, 3m the architect, 15m the building equipment and 6m the laboratory equipment and magazines. The building permit was approved on April 22, 1964. The building was auctioned in March with invitations from 15 contractors, but the tender was canceled as unprofitable. Finally, the project was undertaken by Theoharis Economou and G. Georgiou and G. Balkabassi SA. The foundation was established on May 10, 1965. The building was completed after 3.5 years and was received on October 25, 1968. In 1990 a 6th floor was added to the building. Today the building has a total area of 13,880 square meters.

== The structure of the institution today ==
=== Bodies of administration ===
NHRF governing bodies are:

- Board of Directors
- Director of the NHRF
- Directors of the Institutes

=== Institute of Historical Research (IHR) ===
The Institute emerged in 2012 as a merger of the three oldest institutes for the historical and literary sciences of the National Research Foundation: Center for Greek and Roman Antiquity, Institute for Byzantine Research and Institute for Modern Greek Studies. The director of the institute is Maria Christina Chatziioannou, since 2013.

The institute's research objectives are the historical documentation and interpretation, the diffusion of new knowledge, and the training of young scholars, thus contributing to national self-awareness and active presence in the international scientific community.

The individual sections that make up the institute are:

==== Section of Neohellenic Research ====
Originally named "Center for Modern Greek Studies", it was founded on May 11, 1960, by an act of the Board of Directors of the then Royal Research Foundation and began operating in December of the same year. It was originally housed in Alexandra Michael Mela's privately owned apartment at 4 Vasilissis Sofias Street. Since the winter of 1967 it has moved to the fifth floor of the newly completed NHRF building. In 1989 it was renamed the Institute for Modern Greek Studies. The Section of Neohellenic Research studies the history of Modern Hellenism from the 15th to the 20th century. It develops programs and projects organized in three main disciplines: History of Culture, Economic and Social History, Political History.

Specific subjects emerging from the above are the history of ideas, institutions and ideology, modern Greek literature and historiography, religious art, the history of sciences, Ottoman studies, historical demography and geography, cartography, travel and consular networks, business history, modern political history. His scientific activities include the production of print and digital publications, the creation of electronic applications of historical content, the organization of conferences and the development of an international network of collaborations on contemporary issues.

The directors of the section since its establishment were Michael Laskaris (1960-1962), Konstantinos Th. Dimaras (1962-1972), Dionysios Zakythinos (1971-1975), Deputy Director Manusos Manusakas (1975-1980), Loukia Drarou (1981-1995), Vassilis Panagiotopoulos (1995-2000) Paschalis Kitromilides (2000-2012) and Taxiarchis Kolias (2012-2013). In the first twenty years of the sector's activity, New Hellenism is autonomous as a research field and attempts to "inventory the country's intellectual treasures at national level". Thus the main directions were the inventory of Greek bibliographical production, cataloging and publishing of archival material, bibliographic and literary interests. From 1980 to 2000, it integrates economic and social history, historical geography and demography, the history of institutions, the history of technology and the history of modern Greek art. The institute's research horizons have been enriched by the convening of international scientific meetings. The Center for Modern Greek Studies has been slow to acquire a scientific journal of its own, and its collaborators have published their work in the journal "The Eranist" of the Hellenic Enlightenment Study Group. In 1981 he acquired "Tetradia Ergasias".

==== Section of Byzantine Research ====
The Institute of Byzantine Research was first established under the name of the Byzantine Research Center on May 11, 1960, by an act of the Board of Directors of the then Royal Research Institute and started operating in December of the same year. His successors were Dionysios Zakythinos (1960-1975), Manusos Manusakas (1976-1980), Chryssa Maltezou (1980-1995), Nikolaos Economidis (1995-2000), Evangelos Chrysos (2000-2005) and from in 2006 to 2012 Taxiarchis Colias. Since its inception, the sector has been designed to enhance research and promote the history and culture of Byzantium and medieval Hellenism. An additional goal is to explore Byzantine relations with medieval Europe, the Balkans and the Eastern Mediterranean. Testimonials from written sources, literary and archival, artwork and archaeological finds form the basis of the research. The department's activity is organized into programs that implement a variety of projects covering a wide range of research fields and specialties, publishing sources and highlighting archival collections (such as the Archives of Mount Athos and Patmos Monasteries). The Department of Byzantine Studies is one of the most important and authoritative centers of Byzantine studies internationally.

==== Section of Greek and Roman Antiquity ====
Founded in 1979, the Section of Greek and Roman Antiquity—originally called "Center of Greek and Roman Antiquity" (ΚΕΡΑ)—has as its object the political, economic, social and cultural phenomena and events of Greek and Roman Antiquity, with the aim of renewing and promoting archeological studies through the collection and publication of primary evidence and synthetic studies.

==== Aims and actions ====
The Institute for Historical Research investigates the political, economic, social, and cultural history of Hellenism and the areas where Hellenism was active, from prehistoric antiquity to modern times.

In addition, it aims to develop scientific activities aimed at the creation and dissemination of new knowledge as well as the training of new researchers with the ultimate aim of scientific research of Greek history, the establishment of Greek national self-knowledge and the promotion of international scientific cooperation in the fields of.

The institute's infrastructure comprises specialized Libraries of the Sectors, micro-libraries, folders, archives and electronic databases. The institute's scientific work is supported by the Publications Unit.

The findings of the research are published in three internationally acclaimed scientific journals: Tekmeria, Βyzantina Symmeikta, and Historical Review, as well as in individual volumes.

The institute's total publishing work by 2018 is estimated at 500 titles, making it one of the largest publishers in historical content.

Other activities include the development of educational activities, the organization of "Summer Schools" specialized scientific content, the organization of scientific seminars, such as the "Historical Science Tutorial", "Ermoupolis Seminars", "TERA Seminars" and the support of trainees.

The dissemination of the institute's scientific work is carried out by publishing, organizing conferences and various other activities.

=== Institute of Chemical Biology ===
The Institute of Chemical Biology (ICB) is the former Institute of Biology, Pharmaceutical Chemistry and Biotechnology of the NHRF (formerly there were separate Biology and Pharmaceutical Chemistry and Biotechnology) and was established in March 2012. Its goal is to develop an interdisciplinary research approach in areas such as biotechnology, medicine and health, being a focal point of innovation at the interface of Chemistry and Biology. According to the NHRF it is the only institute in Greece that operates with similar capabilities in cutting-edge biological research (biological targeting, biological evaluation of new substance properties) and organic and pharmaceutical chemistry with rational design and synthesis of bioactive compounds—potential drugs—specific for the above goals. Therefore, an integrated interdisciplinary approach to disease prevention and treatment can be achieved.

The Institute of Chemical Biology relies on interdisciplinary coupling of chemistry and biology with the know-how of its staff and its developed infrastructures to produce work as a cutting-edge unit at Greek and international level.

One of its main goals is the development of new drugs and high value-added biotech products in general. According to the institute, contributing to research in areas such as "Biomedical and Health", "Agro-biotechnology and Food", "Energy and the Environment" can make a significant contribution to Greece's economic development.

The individual development goals of the ICB Institute include:

- Development of new bioactive compounds against selected therapeutic targets and preclinical control in modern disease models, with the aim of their potential use in innovative approaches in the prevention, chemotherapy and treatment of diseases
- Utilizing up-to-date holistic approaches to chemical and biological analysis in environmental health research, early-stage disease diagnosis,
- a) Development of white biotechnology and green chemistry for the production of environmentally friendly processes, products or processes that can be exploited by the food, cosmetic, fuel, and chemical industries. (b) Chemical and metabolomic analysis in the food and beverage sector.
- Strengthening partnerships with private and public sector stakeholders, transfer of know-how and provision of specialized research services
- Strengthening the institute's activities in the fields of education / training and dissemination of scientific information.

An integral part of ICB's activities is the training of young scientists in the preparation of diplomas and the acquisition of postgraduate (MSc) and doctoral (PhD) degrees. ICB also organizes seminars, workshops and conferences with national and international participation by major scientists, with an emphasis on Chemical Biology.

Since 2015, ICB has been participating in the groundbreaking inter-institutional postgraduate program entitled "Bioentrepreneurship" (Greek: "Βιοεπιχειρείν") organized by the Department of Biochemistry & Biotechnology of the University of Thessaly and ICB / NHRF. The interinstitutional Postgraduate Diploma Program "Bioentrepreneurship" aims at the scientific training and specialization of scientists in the fields of bio-entrepreneurship and innovation in the fields of health, nutrition, biochemistry and molecular diagnostics and environment. The Institute of Chemical Biology participates in the "CRIPIS" (Greek: "ΚΡΙΠΗΣ") program.

The director of the institute is Alexander Pintzas.

=== Theoretical and Physical Chemistry Institute ===
The Institute of Theoretical and Physical Chemistry was founded in 1979 and is one of the three research institutes of the National Research Foundation. According to the NHRF, its main objectives are:

- the development of scientific knowledge in selected cutting-edge fields of theoretical & computational chemistry and physics, physicochemistry & materials spectroscopy and photonics.
- the education / training of new undergraduate, postgraduate and post-doctoral scientists in the methodology and practice of modern research
- the promotion of developing know-how in selected application areas and the provision of research services through specialized laboratories.

The institute has 19 doctoral researchers, one operational scientist, one technical scientist and one secretary and is supported by a growing number of postdoctoral and postgraduate researchers as well as distinguished collaborating researchers from Greece and other countries.

The institute's infrastructures include laboratories of computational physics & chemistry, synthesis and spectroscopic characterization of new materials, as well as photonics & applications and spectroscopy.

The expenditures of the institute are covered by the NHRF Regular Budget (grant from the General Secretariat for Research and Technology—GSRT), from inputs from competing programs of the GSRT, the European Union and international organizations, from the execution of applied research projects by industry, and by providing research services.

The theoretical and experimental directions of the Institute include the research activity of the following groups:

- Theoretical and Computational Chemistry and Physics
  - Molecular Physics and Computational Chemistry
  - Atomic and molecular physics
  - Condensed Matter Theory
- Materials Synthesis and Physical chemistry
  - Nanostructured amorphous materials with advanced functionality
  - Self-assembled nanostructures and complex nanomaterials
  - Carbon based nanostructured materials
  - Laser-based Techniques and Applications
- Photonics for Nano-applications
  - Nano-scale physicochemical phenomena
  - Bio-photonics and space applications
  - Photonic Devices and Sensors

Primary role in the transfer of know-how from the institute to the users is played by the two application laboratories, which act as a dynamic interface between the institute's materials and photonics research activities and a wide range of industrial R&T requirements.

- Laboratory of Photonics and Nanotechnologies (2001), which is mainly active in EU-applied research programs, and international organizations (ESA, EDA) participating in national business networks
- Spectroscopy Applications Laboratory (1997) providing exclusively Research & Development services to industry that require development of new specialized methodologies

The institute's facilities include laboratories of computational physics and chemistry, synthesis and spectroscopic characterization of new materials, as well as photonics and applications and laser spectroscopy.

Also an important part of TPCI's activity is the education and training of new undergraduate, postgraduate and postdoctoral scientists in the methodology and practice of modern research.

The director of the institute is Stratos Kamitsos.

=== Library of Science, Technology, Culture (The K.Th. Dimaras Library) ===
The Library of Science, Technology, Culture "Dimaras", founded in 1958, is one of the largest libraries of scientific and technological journals in Greece. The library serves the entire scientific community while being open to the general public. In the Library of the "K. Th. Dimaras" in the NHRF, visitors have access to all the collections on site (printed and electronic subscriptions) through the Electronic Reading Room. Free WiFi connection from the laptop is possible and photocopies can be printed as the library is not lending.

The K.Th. Dimaras Library is the basis for the development of the Digital Documentation Library of Science, Technology and Culture of the National Documentation Center (NDC). The library offers search and access to online collections and services, and allows its users to search for free access magazines and resources on the Internet. In addition, users can use online services to search international bibliography, citation index & bibliometric indices and order complete texts.

The library serves 30,000 readers and 10,000 users annually by sending copies of its material. It is also a reference library for the 233 libraries of the National Library of Science and Technology (NLST).

== Operated by the NHRF ==
Apart from these six institutes, the following national scientific facilities are operated by the NHRF:

- National Documentation Centre (EKT)
- The Liaison Office
- The International Relations Office

== See also ==
- Open access in Greece
