= Panayotis Katsoyannis =

Greek-American biochemist (1924–2019)

- Education: University of Athens (PhD)
- Known for: first synthesis of insulin
- Scientific career
- Fields: Biochemistry
- Workplaces: Cornell University; University of Pittsburgh; Brookhaven National Laboratory; Mount Sinai School of Medicine

Panayotis G. Katsoyannis (January 7, 1924 - May 31, 2019) was an American biochemist who is often credited with being the first to synthesize insulin while leading a team at the University of Pittsburgh in the early 1960s. His results synthesizing insulin were achieved almost simultaneously with that of Helmut Zahn at RWTH Aachen University in Germany. In his early years, while doing his PhD at the University of Athens Katsoyannis had been under the mentorship of Leonidas Zervas, who previously developed new synthetic methods for asymmetric cysteine-containing peptides as those in insulin.

Katsoyannis was also noted for his studies on the synthesis of oxytocin and vasopressin. Following his time at the University of Pittsburgh, Katsoyannis served as the head of the division of biochemistry at the Brookhaven National Laboratory and later was appointed as the founding chairman of the department of biochemistry at Mount Sinai School of Medicine in 1967 where he remained until the end of his life, in later years as distinguished service professor and chair emeritus in pharmacologic and systems therapeutics.

Katoyannis received the Commemorative Medallion of the American Diabetes Association in 1972 on the fiftieth anniversary of the discovery of insulin. He also received the Jacobi Medallion from Mount Sinai Alumni in 1995 and an honorary degree from the University of Patras in Greece in 1997. He is a Fellow of the American Association for the Advancement of Science (1966), the New York Academy of Sciences (1977), and a Corresponding Member of the National Academy of Greece (Academy of Athens) (1966).

Katoyannis died on May 31, 2019, at the age of 95.
