= Homemade Jam =

- Genre: Music
- Presented by: Bob Ruzicka
- Country of origin: Canada
- Original language: English
- No. of seasons: 1
- No. of episodes: 3

Production
- Producer: Lee Livingston
- Production location: Edmonton
- Running time: 30 minutes

Original release
- Network: CBC Television
- Release: 24 June – 22 July 1975

Homemade Jam is a Canadian music television miniseries that aired on CBC Television in 1975.

== Premise ==
This Edmonton-produced series featured Bob Ruzicka as host.

== Scheduling ==
This half-hour series was broadcast on Tuesdays at 9:30 p.m. from 24 June to 22 July 1975.

== See also ==
- Ruzicka (TV series)
