= Max Bergmann =

Jewish-German biochemist (1886–1944)

- Born: 12 February 1886; Fürth, Germany
- Died: 7 November 1944 (aged 58); New York City, United States
- Education: Ludwig-Maximilians-Universität München, Friedrich Wilhelm University of Berlin
- Known for: Carboxybenzyl protecting group
- Spouse: Emmy Bergmann
- Children: Peter Bergmann (physicist)
- Scientific career
- Fields: peptide chemistry
- Workplaces: Kaiser Wilhelm Institute for Leather Research; Rockefeller Institute for Medical Research
- Doctoral advisor: Ignaz Bloch
- Doctoral students: Leonidas Zervas

Max Bergmann (12 February 1886 – 7 November 1944) was a Jewish-German biochemist. Together with Leonidas Zervas, the discoverer of the group, they were the first to use the carboxybenzyl protecting group for the synthesis of oligopeptides.

== Life and work ==
Bergmann was born in Fürth, Bavaria, Germany on February 12, 1886, the seventh child of coal wholesalers Salomon and Rosalie Bergmann.

Bergmann started studying biology at the Ludwig-Maximilians-Universität München, but lectures by Adolf von Baeyer captured his interest and eventually persuaded him to switch to Organic Chemistry. He continued his chemical studies at the Friedrich Wilhelm University of Berlin, where he was taught by Emil Fischer. After receiving his PhD under the supervision of Ignaz Bloch [de] in 1911 for his thesis on acyl(polysulfides), he became the assistant to Fischer at the University of Berlin, where he stayed until Fischer's death in 1919. He received his habilitation in 1921.

In 1922 Bergmann was made the first director of the Kaiser Wilhelm Institute for Leather Research in Dresden, which was created in 1921 and from which the Max Planck Institute of Biochemistry descends. It was there that he worked with his former doctoral student, Leonidas Zervas, who eventually rose to vice-director of the institute and briefly succeeded Bergmann as director. In the early 1930s, the two scientists developed the Bergmann-Zervas carbobenzoxy method for the synthesis of polypeptides, which started the field of controlled peptide chemical synthesis and remained the dominant method in it for the next 20 years. Bergmann and Zervas gained international academic fame as a result.

Bergmann was nonetheless forced to abandon his institute due to his Jewish origin after the passage of the Civil Service Law and emigrated from Nazi Germany in 1933. He moved to the USA and was thereafter active as a senior researcher at the Rockefeller Institute for Medical Research in New York. There, he was the main specialist in protein chemistry and contributed to the great progress of the US in the area of molecular biology. Two eventual Nobel Prize winners (William Howard Stein and Stanford Moore), as well as numerous postdoctoral students (including Klaus H. Hofmann) worked in his laboratory.

Bergmann is considered an important figure in synthetic organic chemistry and biochemistry. He specialized in decoding peptide structures, while also researching their synthesis.

He died in the Mount Sinai Hospital, New York City, on 7 November 1944.

He was elected in 1936 a fellow of the American Association for the Advancement of Science. Since 1980, the Max-Bergmann-Kreis (MBK) company of German peptide chemists awards the Bergmann golden medal for peptide science, with the first medal given to Zervas. In 2002 the Max Bergmann Center was created in Dresden.
