= Nefeli Chatziioannidou =

Greek politician

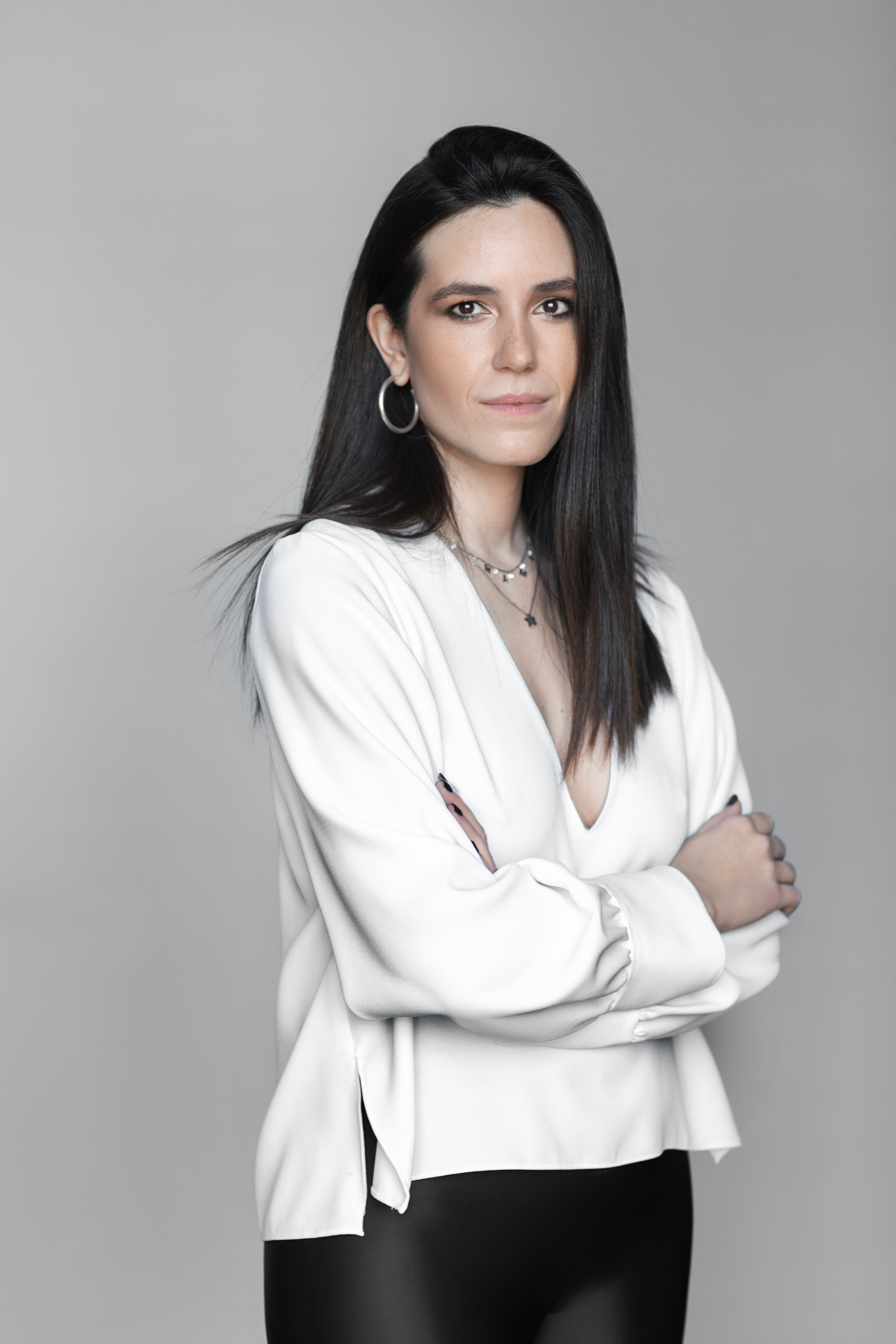
- Nefeli Chatziioannidou in 2021

Member of the Greek Parliament
- Incumbent
- Assumed office 2023
- Constituency: National list

Personal details
- Party: New Democracy

Maria Nefeli Chatziioannidou is a Greek politician from New Democracy. She was elected to the Hellenic Parliament from the National List in the June 2023 Greek legislative election.

She is a social entrepreneur and is founder of the social enterprise Great Women (Yperoxes Gynaikes), the first online women's community in Greece.
