= Maria Christina Chatziioannou =

Maria Christina Chatziioannou is director of Neohellenic research at the Institute of Historical Research of the National Hellenic Research Foundation. She is a specialist in the social and economic history of Greece, diaspora studies, and the history of trade.

Chatziioannou is a graduate of the National and Kapodistrian University of Athens and the Sapienza University of Rome.

Chatziioannou has taught at the National and Kapodistrian University of Athens and the University of Crete. She has been a visiting professor at the Ecole des Hautes Etudes en Sciences Sociales, C.R.H., Paris.

== Selected publications ==
- The Original Debt: The Loans of Greek National Independence. Athens: Gutenberg, 2013. [in Greek] (Issues of Economic History series)
- "The story of the Ralli dynasty reconstructed" in Katerina Dede, Dimitris Dimitropoulos (eds), Through the eyes of others. Perceptions of people who have marked three centuries (18th-20th), Athens, (INR/NHRF), 2012, pp. 149–172. [in Greek]
- "Networking and Spatial Allocation around the Mediterranean, Seventeenth-Nineteenth Centuries". Special issue of The Historical Review / La Revue Historique, 7 (2012), Athens: INR/NHRF.
- "Diaspora–Networks– Enlightenment", Tetradia Ergasias 28, Athens: INR/NHRF, 2005. [in Greek] (Edited with Maria A. Stasinopoulou)
- Family strategy and commercial competition. The Geroussi merchant house in the 19th century. Athens: Cultural Foundation of National Bank of Greece, 2003.
