= Tetraprenyl-beta-curcumene synthase =

Tetraprenyl-β-curcumene synthase

Identifiers
- EC no.: 4.2.3.130

Databases
- IntEnz: IntEnz view
- BRENDA: BRENDA entry
- ExPASy: NiceZyme view
- KEGG: KEGG entry
- MetaCyc: metabolic pathway
- PRIAM: profile
- PDB structures: RCSB PDB PDBe PDBsum
Search
- PMC: articles
- PubMed: articles
- NCBI: proteins

Tetraprenyl-β-curcumene synthase (EC 4.2.3.130, ytpB (gene)) is an enzyme with systematic name all-trans-heptaprenyl-diphosphate diphosphate-lyase (cyclizing, tetraprenyl-β-curcumene-forming). This enzyme catalyses the following chemical reaction

all-trans-heptaprenyl diphosphate $\rightleftharpoons$ tetraprenyl-β-curcumene + diphosphate

This enzyme is isolated from Bacillus subtilis.
