= Sigmund Fraenkel =

Austrian chemist (1868–1939)

Sigmund Fraenkel or Sigmund Fränkel (22 May 1868 – 7 June 1939) was an Austrian chemist. He is notable for being the head of the Ludwig-Spiegler-Stiftung in Vienna from 1904 and his work in the field of Physiological chemistry, notably on the chemistry of the thyroid gland.

== Life ==
Fraenkel was born on 22 May 1868 in Kraków, which was then part of Austria-Hungary (now in Poland). He studied at the University of Vienna under Ernst Ludwig (1842–1915) and Ernst Wilhelm von Brücke, in Prague under Karl Hugo Huppert (1832–1904) and in Freiburg im Breisgau. In 1892 he obtained his doctorate in medicine in Vienna, and in 1896 he was Private Tutor in Medicinal chemistry.

He died on 7 June 1939, in Geneva, Switzerland.

== Works ==
- Die Arzneimittel-Synthese auf Grundlage der Beziehungen zwischen chemischen Aufbau und Wirkung : für Ärzte, Chemiker und Pharmazeuten . Springer, Berlin 3rd ed. 1912 Digital edition by the University and State Library Düsseldorf

== Publications ==
- Über neue Cholesterin-Derivate – Sigmund Fränkel & Paul Dombacher (May 1927)
