= Benzyl chloroformate =

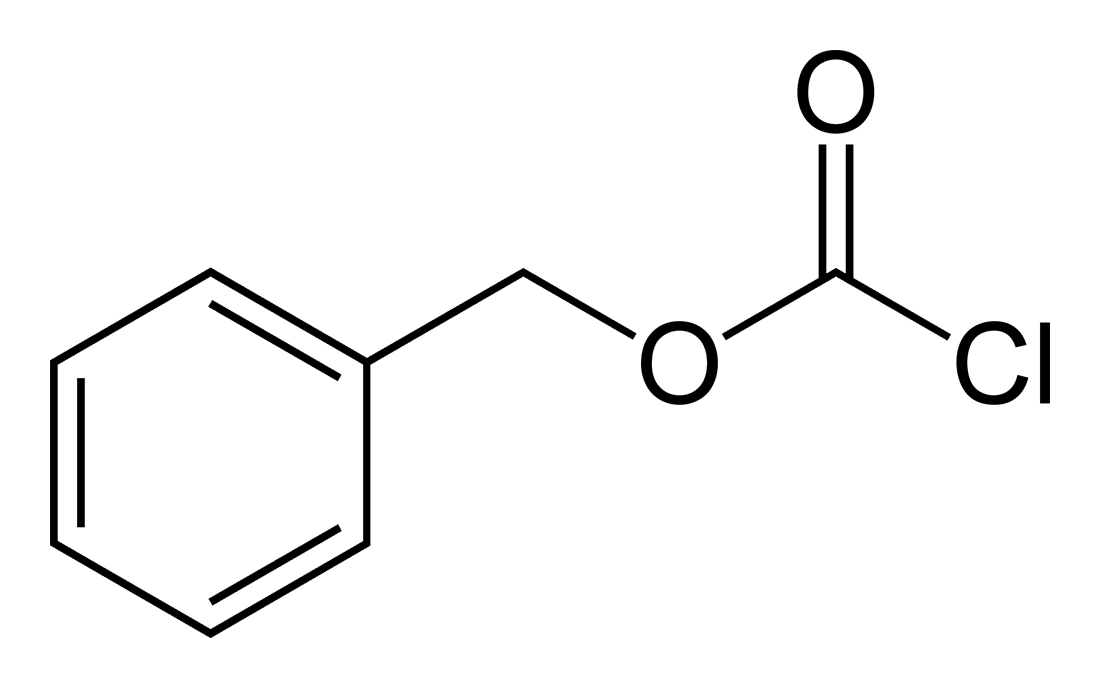
- Skeletal formula of benzyl chloroformate

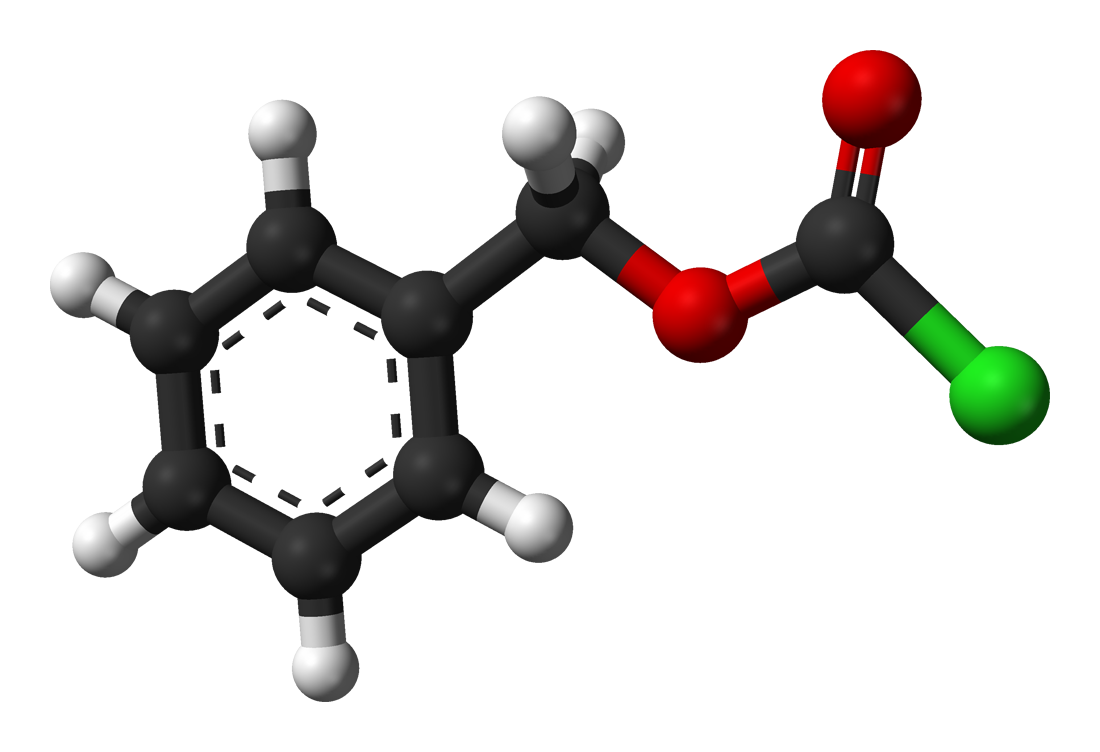
- Ball-and-stick model of the benzyl chloroformate molecule

Names
- Preferred IUPAC name Benzyl carbonochloridate
- Other names Benzyl chloroformate Benzyloxycarbonyl chloride Z-Chloride

Identifiers
CAS Number	501-53-1
3D model (JSmol)	Interactive image
ChemSpider	9958
ECHA InfoCard	100.007.205
EC Number	207-925-0
PubChem CID	10387
RTECS number	LQ5860000
UNII	170BP0DD31
UN number	1739
CompTox Dashboard (EPA)	DTXSID9027158
- InChI: InChI=1S/C8H7ClO2/c9-8(10)11-6-7-4-2-1-3-5-7/h1-5H,6H2 Key: HSDAJNMJOMSNEV-UHFFFAOYSA-N; InChI=1/C8H7ClO2/c9-8(10)11-6-7-4-2-1-3-5-7/h1-5H,6H2 Key: HSDAJNMJOMSNEV-UHFFFAOYAW
- SMILES: ClC(=O)OCc1ccccc1

Properties
Chemical formula	C_{8}H_{7}ClO_{2}
Molar mass	170.59 g·mol^{−1}
Appearance	colorless liquid, may appear yellow due to impurities
Odor	pungent
Density	1.195 g/cm^{3}
Boiling point	103 °C (217 °F; 376 K) (20 Torr)
Solubility in water	degrades
Refractive index (n_{D})	1.519 (589 nm)

Hazards
- GHS labelling
Pictograms	(GHS06: Toxic) (GHS09: Environmental hazard)
Signal word	Danger
Hazard statements	H314, H410
Precautionary statements	P260, P264, P273, P280, P301+P330+P331, P303+P361+P353, P304+P340, P305+P351+P338, P310, P321, P363, P391, P405, P501
Flash point	80 °C (176 °F; 353 K)
Safety data sheet (SDS)	External MSDS
- Except where otherwise noted, data are given for materials in their standard state (at 25 °C [77 °F], 100 kPa). verify (what is ?) Infobox references

Benzyl chloroformate, also known as benzyl chlorocarbonate or Z-chloride, is the benzyl ester of chloroformic acid. It can be also described as the chloride of the benzyloxycarbonyl (Cbz or Z) group. In its pure form it is a water-sensitive oily colorless liquid, although impure samples usually appear yellow. It possesses a characteristic pungent odor and degrades in contact with water.

The compound was first prepared by Leonidas Zervas in the early 1930s who used it for the introduction of the benzyloxycarbonyl protecting group, which became the basis of the Bergmann-Zervas carboxybenzyl method of peptide synthesis he developed with Max Bergmann. This was the first successful method of controlled peptide chemical synthesis and for twenty years it was the dominant procedure used worldwide until the 1950s. To this day, benzyl chloroformate is often used for amine group protection.

== Preparation ==
The compound is prepared in the lab by treating benzyl alcohol with phosgene:

PhCH_{2}OH + COCl_{2} → PhCH_{2}OC(O)Cl + HCl

Phosgene is used in excess to minimise the production of the carbonate (PhCH_{2}O)_{2}C=O.

The use of phosgene gas in the lab preparation carries a very large health hazard, and has been implicated in the chronic pulmonary disease of pioneers in the usage of the compound such as Zervas.

== Amine protection ==
Benzyl chloroformate is commonly used in organic synthesis for the introduction of the benzyloxycarbonyl (formerly called carboxybenzyl) protecting group for amines. The protecting group is abbreviated Cbz or Z (in honor of discoverer Zervas), hence the alternative shorthand designation for benzyl chloroformate as Cbz-Cl or Z-Cl.

Benzyloxycarbonyl is a key protecting group for amines, suppressing the nucleophilic and basic properties of the N lone pair. This "reactivity masking" property, along with the ability to prevent racemization of Z-protected amines, made the Z group the basis of the Begmann-Zervas synthesis of oligopeptides (1932) where the following general reaction is performed to protect the N-terminus of a serially growing oligopeptide chain:

This reaction was hailed as a "revolution" and essentially started the distinct field of synthetic peptide chemistry. It remained unsurpassed in utility for peptide synthesis until the early 1950s when mixed anhydride and active ester methodologies were developed.

Although the reaction is no longer commonly used for peptides, it is nonetheless very widespread for amine protection in other applications within organic synthesis and total synthesis. Common procedures to achieve protection starting from benzyl chloroformate include:

- Benzyl chloroformate and a base, such as sodium carbonate in water at 0 °C
- Benzyl chloroformate and magnesium oxide in ethyl acetate at 70 °C to reflux
- Benzyl chloroformate, DIPEA, acetonitrile and scandium trifluoromethanesulfonate (Sc(OTf)_{3})

Alternatively, the Cbz group can be generated by the reaction of an isocyanate with benzyl alcohol (as in the Curtius rearrangement).

=== Deprotection ===
Hydrogenolysis in the presence of a variety of palladium-based catalysts is the usual method for deprotection. Palladium on charcoal is typical.

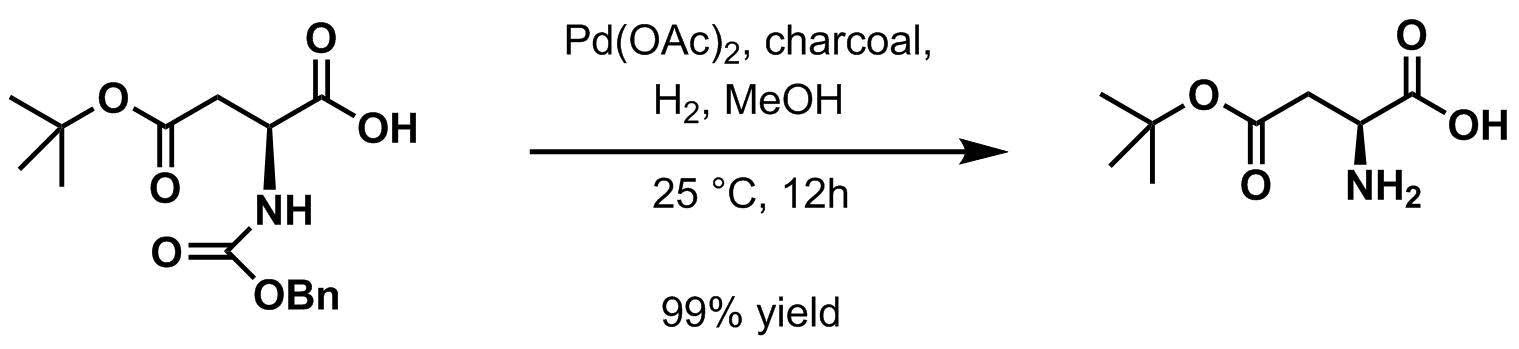

Alternatively, HBr and strong Lewis acids have been used, provided that a trap is provided for the released benzyl carbocation.

When the protected amine is treated by either of the above methods (i.e. by catalytic hydrogenation or acidic workup), it yields a terminal carbamic acid which then readily decarboxylates to give the free amine.

2-Mercaptoethanol can also be used, in the presence of potassium phosphate in dimethylacetamide.
