= Ruzicka (TV program) =

- Genre: Music
- Presented by: Bob Ruzicka
- Country of origin: Canada
- Original language: English
- No. of seasons: 1

Production
- Production location: Edmonton
- Running time: 30 minutes

Original release
- Network: CBC Television
- Release: 12 January – 27 April 1972

Ruzicka is a Canadian music program that aired on CBC Television in 1972.

== Premise ==
This Edmonton-produced program featured dentist and musician Bob Ruzicka (later of Homemade Jam). Guests seen during the series run included Leon Bibb, John Allan Cameron, The Good Brothers, Dan Hill, Ann Mortifee, Colleen Peterson, Stan Rogers, Brent Titcomb, Sylvia Tyson, and Valdy.

== Scheduling ==
This half-hour program was broadcast Wednesdays at 8:30 p.m. (Eastern time) from 12 January to 27 April 1972.
