= Leopold Ružička =

Croatian-Swiss chemist (1887–1976)

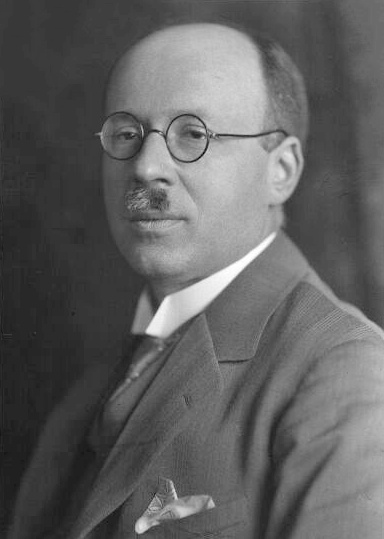
- Ružićka in 1935
- Pronunciation: Croatian: [lâʋoslaʋ stjêpaːn rǔʒitʃka]
- Born: Lavoslav Stjepan Ružička; 13 September 1887; Vukovar, Kingdom of Croatia-Slavonia, Austria-Hungary (present-day Croatia)
- Died: 26 September 1976 (aged 89); Mammern, Switzerland
- Citizenship: Transleithania (1887–1917); Switzerland (1917–1976)
- Education: Technische Hochschule Karlsruhe
- Known for: Research on terpenes Synthesis of testosterone Ružička reaction
- Awards: Marcel Benoist Prize (1938); Nobel Prize for Chemistry (1939); ForMemRS (1942); Faraday Lectureship Prize (1958)
- Scientific career
- Fields: Biochemistry
- Workplaces: ETH Zurich, Utrecht University
- Thesis: Über Phenylmethylketen (1911)
- Doctoral advisor: Hermann Staudinger
- Doctoral students: George Büchi; Duilio Arigoni; Arie Jan Haagen-Smit; Moses Wolf Goldberg; Klaus H. Hofmann; George Rosenkranz; Cyril A. Grob; Edgar Heilbronner; Albert Eschenmoser

Leopold Ružička ForMemRS (pronounced [rǔʒitʃka]; born Lavoslav Stjepan Ružička; 13 September 1887 – 26 September 1976) was a Croatian-Swiss scientist and joint winner of the 1939 Nobel Prize in Chemistry "for his work on polymethylenes and higher terpenes" "including the first chemical synthesis of male sex hormones." He worked most of his life in Switzerland, and received eight doctorates honoris causa in science, medicine, and law; seven prizes and medals; and twenty-four honorary memberships in chemical, biochemical, and other scientific societies.

== Early life ==
Ružička was born in Vukovar (at the time in the Syrmia County of Austria-Hungary, today in Croatia). His family of craftsmen and farmers was mostly of Croat origin, with a Czech great-grandparent, Ružička, and a great-grandmother and a great-grandfather from Austria. He lost his father, Stjepan, at the age of four, and his mother, Amalija Sever, took him and his younger brother Stjepan, to live in Osijek.

Ružička attended the classics program at the gymnasium (secondary school) in Osijek. He changed his original idea of becoming a priest and switched to studying technical disciplines. Chemistry was his choice, probably because he hoped to get a position at the newly opened sugar refinery built in Osijek.

Owing to the excessive hardship of everyday and political life, he left and chose the High Technical School in Karlsruhe in Germany. He was a good student in areas he liked and that he thought would be necessary and beneficial in the future, which was organic chemistry. That is why his physical chemistry professor, Fritz Haber (Nobel laureate in 1918), opposed his summa cum laude degree. However, in the course of his studies, Ružička set up excellent cooperation with Hermann Staudinger (a Nobel laureate in 1953). Studying within Staudinger's department, he obtained his doctoral degree in 1910, then moved to Zürich as Staudinger's assistant.

== Career in research ==
Ružička's first works originated in the field of chemistry of natural compounds. He remained in this field of research all his life. He investigated the ingredients of the Dalmatian insect powder Pyrethrum (from the herb Tanacetum cinerariifolium), a highly esteemed insecticide found in pyrethrins, which were the focus of his work with Staudinger. Ružička later said of this time: "Toward the end of five and a half years of mainly synthetic work on the pyrethrins I had come to the firm conclusion that we were barking up the wrong tree." In this way, he came into contact with the chemistry of Terpineol, a fragrant oil of vegetable origin, interesting to the perfume industry. He and Staudinger split company when he started cooperation with the Chuit & Naef Company (later known as Firmenich) in Geneva.

In 1916–1917, he received the support of the oldest perfume manufacturer in the world Haarman & Reimer, of Holzminden, Germany. He became a Swiss citizen in 1917, and published his Habilitation in 1918. Fornasir and he isolated linalool in 1919.

With expertise in the terpene field, he became senior lecturer in 1918, and in 1923, honorary professor at the ETH (Eidgenössische Technische Hochschule) as well as the University of Zurich. Here, with a group of his doctoral students, he proved the structure of the compounds muscone and civetone, macrocyclic ketone scents derived from the musk deer (Moschus moschiferus) and the civet cat (Viverra civetta). These were the first natural products shown to have rings with more than six atoms, and at the time that Ružička inferred that civetone as having a 17-member ring. Synthetic techniques at the time were only known for rings of up to eight members. Muscone had been isolated in 1904 but was not identified as 3-methylcyclopentadecanone until Ružička suspected a macrocycle, having characterised civetone. He also developed a method for synthesising macrocycles, now known as the Ružička large ring synthesis, which he demonstrated by preparing civetone in 1927.

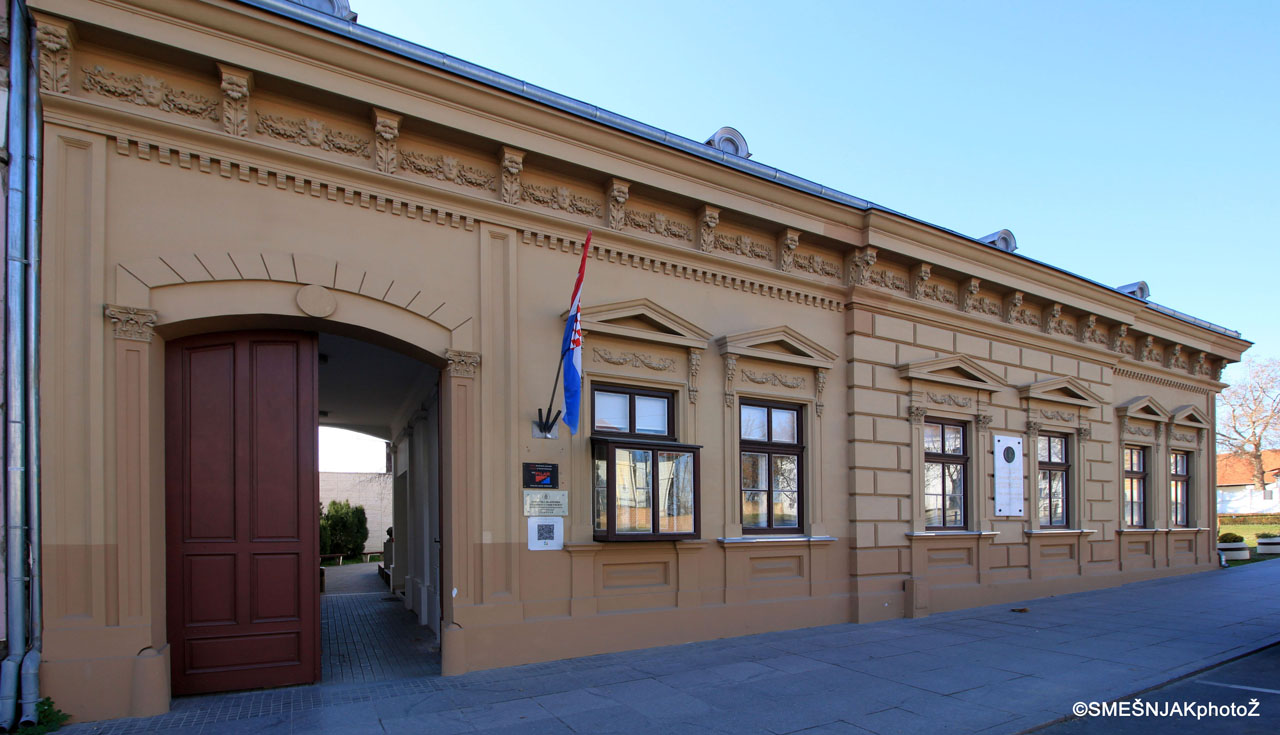
Leopold Ružička Memorial Museum in his house in Vukovar, Croatia

In 1921, the Geneva perfume manufacturers Chuit & Naef asked him to collaborate. Working here, Ružička achieved financial independence, but not as big as he had planned, so he left Zürich to start working for the Basel-based CIBA. In 1927, he took over the organic chemistry chair at Utrecht University in the Netherlands. In the Netherlands, he remained for three years and then returned to Switzerland, which was superior in its chemical industry. A synergistic upheaval in both the administration and chemistry departments coincided to make his good fortune.

Ružička was the first to synthesize musk at an industrial scale. Firmenech named this product Exaltone. Other Swiss manufacturers and DuPont were in competition with them.

In 1934, Ružička synthesized the male hormone androsterone and also proved "its constitutional and configurational relation to the sterols." This was followed in 1935 by the partial synthesis of the much more active male hormone testosterone. Both discoveries led to the pre-eminence of the Swiss industry in the steroid hormone field. At ETH Zurich he became a professor of organic chemistry and started the most brilliant period of his professional career. He widened the area of his research, adding to it the chemistry of higher terpenes and steroids. After the successful synthesis in 1935 of sex hormones (androsterone and testosterone), his laboratory became the world centre of organic chemistry. He was awarded in 1936 an honorary degree from Harvard University.

In 1939 he won the Nobel Prize in Chemistry with Adolf Butenandt. Over the period 1934–1939 he published 70 papers in the field of medicinally important steroid sex hormones, and filed several dozen patents besides.

In 1940, following the award, he was invited by the Croatian Chemical Association, where he delivered a lecture to an over-packed hall of dignitaries. The topic of the lecture was From the Dalmatian Insect Powder to Sex Hormones. In 1940 he became a foreign member of the Royal Netherlands Academy of Arts and Sciences, in 1942 he was elected a foreign member of the Royal Society, and in 1944 he became an international member of the US National Academy of Sciences. During World War II, some of his excellent collaborators were lost, but Ružička restructured his laboratory with new, younger and promising people; among them was young scientist and future Nobel laureate Vladimir Prelog. With new people and ideas new research areas were opened.

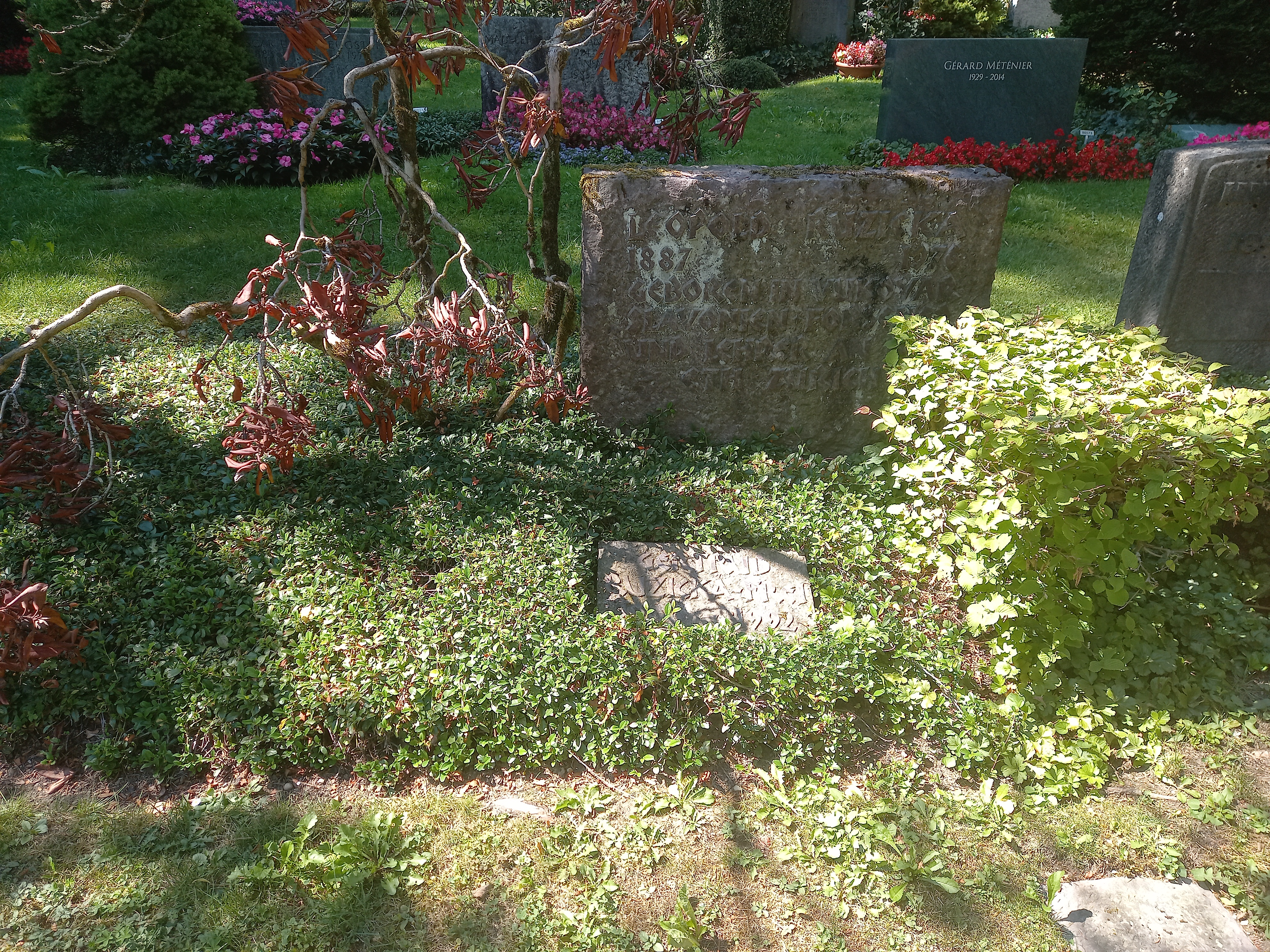
The grave of Leopold Ružička and his wife Gertrud Frei in the Fluntern Cemetery in Zürich, Switzerland

In 1946, Ružička and Lardon "established that the fragrance of ambergris is based on the triterpene (named) ambrein".

Following 1950, Ružička returned to chemistry, which had entered a new era of research. Now he turned to the field of biochemistry, the problems of evolution and the genesis of life, particularly to the biogenesis of terpenes. In 1953, he published his hypothesis, the Biogenetic Isoprene Rule (that the carbon skeleton of terpenes is composed variously of regularly or irregularly linked isoprene units), which was the peak of his scientific career. In 1952, Oskar Jeger and he supervised a team which isolated lanosterol and established the link between terpenes and steroids. Ružička retired in 1957, turning over the running of the laboratory to Prelog.

== Later life, legacy, honours and awards ==
Ružička was the recipient of eight honorary doctorates and the 1938 Marcel Benoist Prize. He was listed as an author on 583 scientific papers. In 1965, he became an honorary member of the Polish Chemical Society, and he was an honorary member of the American Academy of Arts and Sciences. After the war he acquired a taste for Dutch masterpieces, which he later lodged in the Kunsthaus Zürich as the Ružička collection. He militated against nuclear weapons.

In 1970, Ružička delivered to the Nobel Laureate Conferences in Lindau a lecture entitled "Nobel Prizes and the chemistry of life".

In later years, he served as a consultant to Sandoz A. G. of Basel.

Ružička dedicated significant efforts to the problems of education. He insisted on a better organization of academic education and scientific work in the new Yugoslavia, and established the Swiss-Yugoslav Society. Ružička became an honorary academician at the then Yugoslav Academy of Sciences and Arts in Zagreb.

In 1974 he was awarded the Order of the Yugoslav Flag with Golden Wreath.

At ETH Zurich, the Ružička Award was established in 1957 on the occasion of his retirement, for young chemists working in Switzerland.

In his native Vukovar, a museum was opened in his honour in 1977.

Ružička's archives are kept at ETH Zurich.

The Ružička reaction is named after him.

=== Personal life ===
Ružička married twice: to Anna Hausmann in 1912, and in 1951 to Gertrud Acklin. From 1929, he lived at Freudenbergstrasse 101 until the last years of his life. He died in Mammern, Switzerland, a village on Lake Constance at the age of 89.
