= Greek Atomic Energy Commission =

Greek government agency

The Greek Atomic Energy Commission (EEAE) is an independent government agency of Greece which is responsible for atomic safety, development and regulations and for monitoring artificially produced ionizing and non-ionizing radiation. The seven-member board of directors operate under the supervision of the Ministry of Development through the General Secretariat of Research and Technology.

The EEAE was established by act of legislation in 1954. Among other notable Greek scientists, Leonidas Zervas has served twice as president of the commission (1964–1965 and 1974–1975).
