= Helmut Zahn =

German chemist (1916–2004)

- Born: 13 June 1916; Erlangen, Germany
- Died: 14 November 2004 (aged 88); Aachen, Germany
- Education: University of Karlsruhe (TH)
- Known for: first synthesis of Insulin
- Scientific career
- Fields: textile chemistry
- Workplaces: RWTH Aachen; University of Heidelberg

Helmut Zahn (born 13 June 1916 in Erlangen; died 14 November 2004 in Aachen) was a German chemist who is often credited as the first to synthesize Insulin in 1963. His results synthesizing insulin were achieved almost simultaneously with that of Panayotis Katsoyannis at the University of Pittsburgh. His work was not honoured by the Nobel Prize because in 1958 Frederick Sanger was the first who discovered the chemical structure of Insulin.

Helmut Zahn studied chemistry at the University of Karlsruhe (TH) and received his PhD in 1940. He habilitated at the University of Heidelberg and became director of the Deutsches Wollforschungsinstitut at the RWTH Aachen University in 1952.

== Decorations and awards ==
- Honorary doctorates from the universities of Barcelona, Belfast, Bradford, Düsseldorf, Leeds and Liège.
- 1979: Austrian Decoration for Science and Art
- 1987: Wilhelm Exner Medal.
