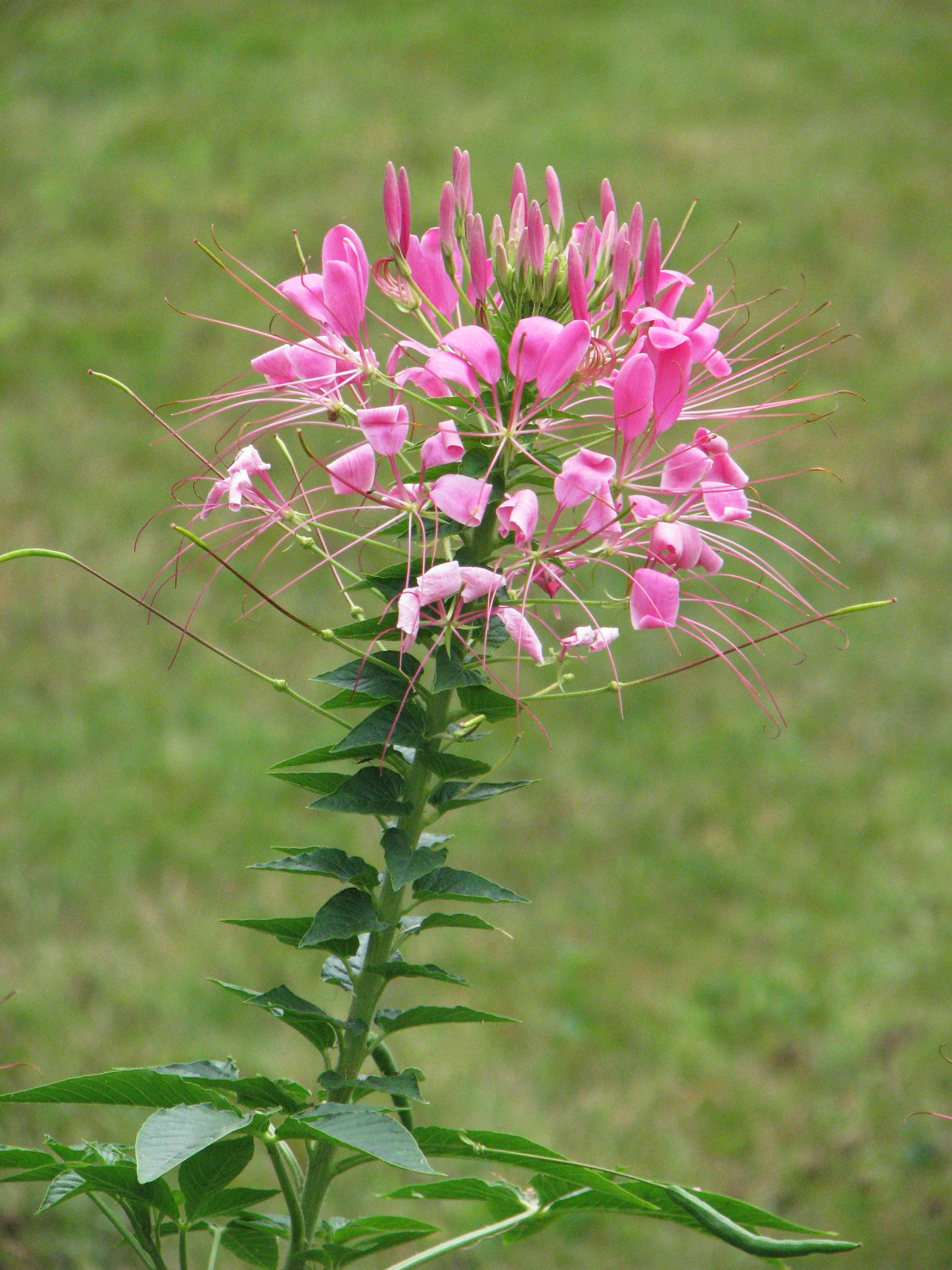
- At the University of Wrocław Botanical Garden
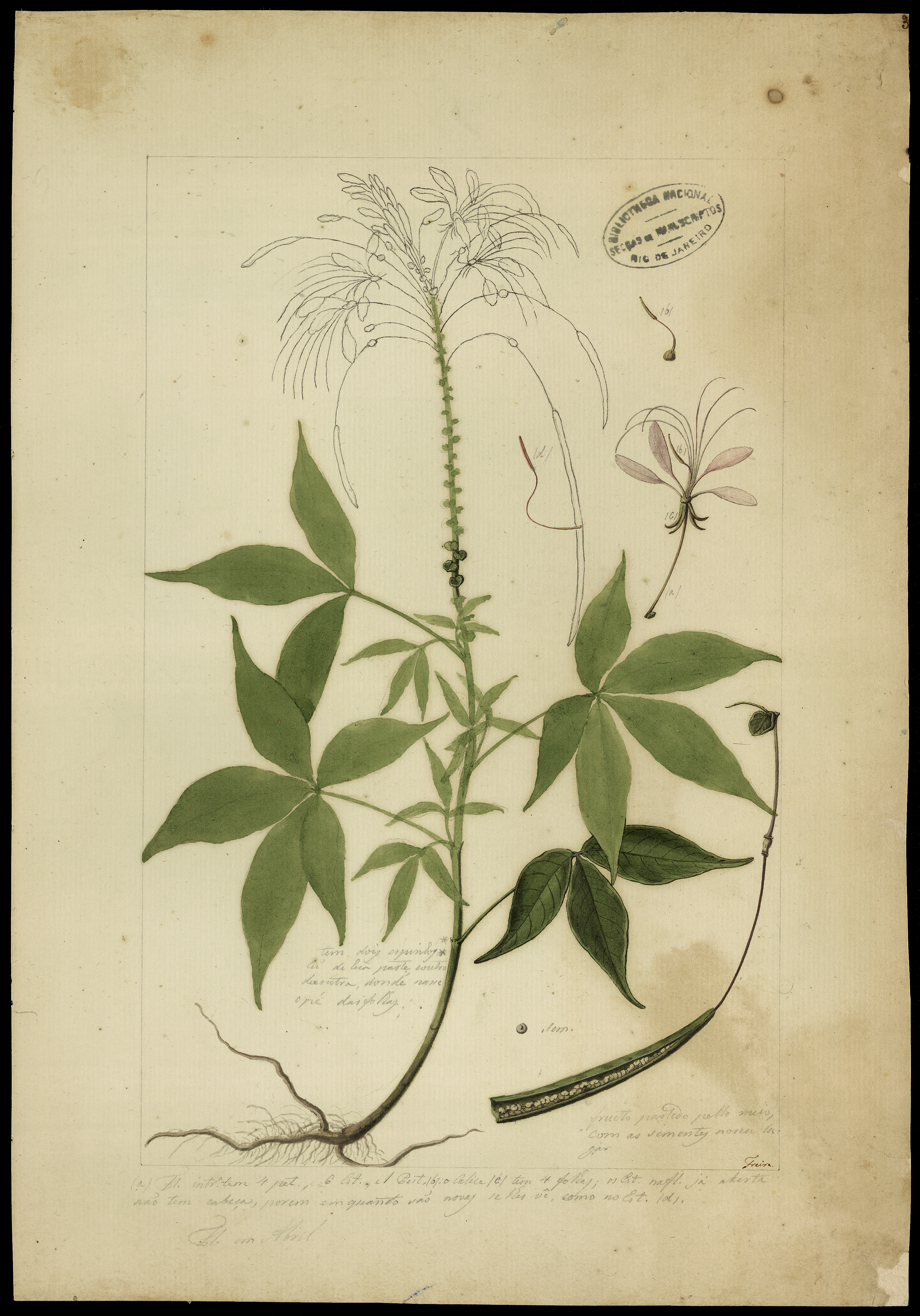
- Botanical illustration

Scientific classification
- Kingdom: Plantae
- Clade: Tracheophytes
- Clade: Angiosperms
- Clade: Eudicots
- Clade: Rosids
- Order: Brassicales
- Family: Cleomaceae
- Genus: Cleome
- Species: C. spinosa

Binomial name
- Cleome spinosa Jacq.

Synonyms
- List: Cleome erucago Mill.; Cleome heptaphylla L.; Cleome pubescens Sims; Cleome pungens Willd.; Cleome pungens var. swartziana Griseb.; Cleome sandwicensis A.Gray; Cleome spinosa Sw.; Cleome spinosa f. pungens (Willd.) Eichler; Cleome spinosa var. subinermis Kuntze; Cleome tonduzii Briq.; Neocleome spinosa (Jacq.) Small; Tarenaya spinosa (Jacq.) Raf.

= Cleome spinosa =

Species of plant in the genus Cleome

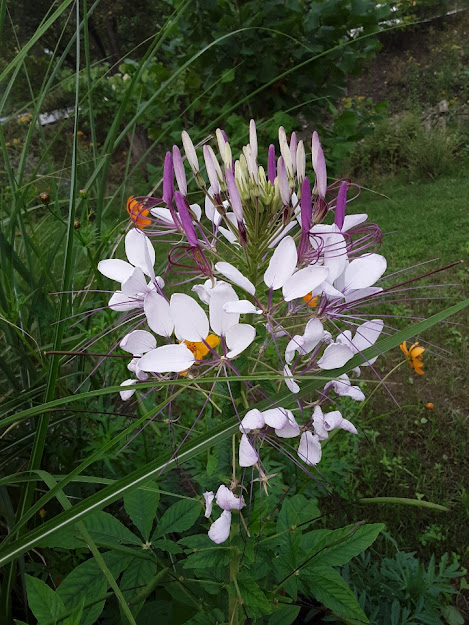
Photo of a spiny spiderflower in Pennsylvania.

Cleome spinosa, called the spiny spiderflower, is a species of flowering plant in the genus Cleome. It is native to the New World Tropics, and has been introduced to the United States, tropical Africa, the Indian Subcontinent, Vietnam, New Caledonia, and Korea. It is pollinated by bats.
