= Lionel Opie =

South African cardiologist (1933–2020)

Lionel Opie OMS FRCP FRSSAf FACC
- Born: Lionel Henry Opie; 6 May 1933; Hanover, South Africa
- Died: 20 February 2020 (aged 86); Cape Town, South Africa
- Spouse: Carol Opie

Academic background
- Education: Bishops Diocesan College
- Alma mater: University of Cape Town; Lincoln College, Oxford

Academic work
- Discipline: Cardiology
- Institutions: University of Cape Town
- Notable works: Drugs for the Heart (1980); Heart Physiology: From Cell to Circulation (1998)

Lionel Henry Opie (6 May 1933 – 20 February 2020) was a South African cardiologist. He was a professor of medicine at the University of Cape Town, where he conducted both experimental and clinical research on heart disease and cardiovascular physiology, metabolism, and pharmacology. He was the founding director of the university's Hatter Institute for Cardiovascular Research and the founding editor of the Journal of Molecular and Cellular Cardiology. He also served as president of the International Society for Heart Research.

== Early life and career ==
Opie was born on 6 May 1933 in Hanover, a small town in the Karoo region of South Africa. He attended Bishops Diocesan College in Cape Town. His interest in medicine was inspired by the example of his father, who was a district surgeon, and by the discovery of penicillin. He attended the University of Cape Town, graduating in 1955 with first-class honours. He served his medical internship at the nearby Groote Schuur Hospital. Thereafter, between 1956 and 1959, he was a Rhodes Scholar at Lincoln College, Oxford, where he completed his DPhil. His doctoral dissertation was about the physiology of artificial respiration.

After leaving Oxford, Opie spent two years in Boston, Massachusetts, where he researched myocardial metabolism as a postdoctoral fellow at the Harvard Medical School. That research culminated in another doctoral dissertation, this one on myocardial intermediary metabolism, which earned him an MD from the University of Cape Town in 1961. Thereafter he returned to England to pursue further basic science research under the mentorship of Hans Krebs and Ernst Chain. He was appointed as a consultant in medicine at the Royal Postgraduate Medical School in London in 1969. In 1970, he and Richard Bing founded the Journal of Molecular and Cellular Cardiology, which became the official publication of the International Society for Heart Research.

== University of Cape Town ==
In 1971 he returned to the University of Cape Town to establish a new research programme, focused on the pathophysiology of myocardial ischemia. His research was initially funded by Christiaan Barnard, who donated the proceeds from sales of his bestselling book One Life. Then from 1976 to 1998 his heart disease research was funded by the Medical Research Council. His clinical activities were based at the Groote Schuur Hospital, where he founded the Hypertension Clinic in the 1980s and led regular sessions in the hospital's Cardiac Clinic. In addition, the University of Cape Town granted him a personal chair in medicine in 1980.

In the 1990s, Opie partnered with Derek Yellon of University College London to establish the University of Cape Town's Hatter Institute for Cardiovascular Research. Yellon said that Opie was "delighted" to delay his retirement to establish the institute. He was the institute's director until 2010, in which capacity he ran its highly acclaimed annual conference series, Cardiology at the Limits. He also had a longstanding appointment at Stanford University as a visiting professor from 1984 to 1998, and he co-founded the Society of Heart and Vascular Metabolism in 2000. After his lengthy tenure as editor of the Journal of Molecular and Cellular Cardiology, he and Henry Neufeld co-founded Cardiovascular Drugs and Therapy, and he was later appointed as international associate editor at Circulation.

== Scholarship and publications ==
Opie published over 540 journal articles, as well as 46 books and 159 book chapters. His central research interests were cardiovascular physiology, cardiovascular metabolism, and cardiovascular pharmacology; in particular, he worked on the metabolic mechanisms of ischemic heart disease and myocardial reperfusion, the cellular metabolism of calcium ions, the role of cyclic adenosine monophosphate in cardiac electrical instability and arrhythmia, and the use of β-blockers and cardioprotective mechanisms. His first major paper, published in 1970, introduced his so-called glucose hypothesis of cardiac metabolism.

Opie's most famous book is Drugs for the Heart, which first appeared in serialisation in The Lancet in 1980; across eight volumes it became "the standard reference on the treatment of heart disease" or "the bible of cardiovascular pharmacology". Heart Physiology: From Cell to Circulation (1998), illustrated by several hundred of Opie's own line drawings, won the University of Cape Town Book Award, and Living Longer, Living Better (2011) received a prize from the British Medical Journalists' Association.

== Personal life and retirement ==
At the age of 80 Opie retired from clinical practice, but he remained involved in research as an honorary professor until 2016. He was ill for the last few years of his life and died of pneumonia on 20 February 2020 in Cape Town. He was married to Carol Opie (née Sancroft-Baker), with whom he had two daughters.

== Honours and awards ==
In 2006, President Thabo Mbeki admitted Opie to the Order of Mapungubwe, granting him the award in silver for "his excellent contribution to the knowledge of and achievement in the field of cardiology". In 2012 the University of Cape Town's Department of Medicine gave him a special award for his prolific and seminal research contributions. He was long rated as an A-level researcher by the South African National Research Foundation, a rare feat for a medical doctor, and he was upgraded to A1-rating in 2008; in 2014 he additionally received the NRF Lifetime Achievement Award.

Among other associations, Opie was a fellow of the Royal College of Physicians, the American College of Cardiology, the European Society of Cardiology, the International Society for Heart Research, the Royal Society of South Africa, the Physiological Society of Southern Africa, and the College of Physicians of South Africa; and he served stints as president of the International Society for Heart Research, the South African Cardiac Society, and the South African Hypertension Society. He holds honorary doctorates from the University of Copenhagen and the University of Stellenbosch. The Lionel Opie Preclinical Imaging Core Facility at the Hatter Institute, unveiled in 2015, is named after him.
