= Maya Schuldiner =

Israeli biologist

- מאיה שולדינר
- Born: March 15, 1975 (age 51); Jerusalem, Israel
- Education: Hebrew University of Jerusalem (B.Sc., 1998); Hebrew University of Jerusalem (Ph.D., 2003)
- Occupation: Molecular geneticist
- Employer: Weizmann Institute of Science
- Notable work: Mechanistic understanding of the basic functions underlying intracellular organization
- Title: Dr. Gilbert Omenn and Martha Darling Professorial Chair in Molecular Genetics

Maya Schuldiner (Hebrew: מאיה שולדינר; born March 15, 1975) is an Israeli molecular geneticist, a full professor at the Faculty of Biochemistry in the Weizmann Institute of Science, who serves as the chair of its scientific council. Her research aims to achieve a mechanistic understanding of the basic functions underlying intracellular organization.

== Biography ==
Maya Schuldiner was born in Jerusalem, the daughter of Eli and Atara Rozik-Rosen. Her father was the Dean of Faculty of Arts in Tel Aviv University and her mother was a historian in the Hebrew University of Jerusalem. Maya was raised in Jerusalem and spent several years in the United States, United Kingdom and France, due to her parents' careers.

She graduated magna cum laude with a B.Sc. in biology from the Hebrew University in Jerusalem in 1998. She went on to complete both her M.Sc. and a Ph.D. in genetics, also at the Hebrew University, in 1999 and 2003, under the supervision of Prof. Nissim Benvenisti.

She then conducted postdoctoral research in the laboratory of Jonathan Weissman at the University of California in San Francisco from 2003 until 2008, when she joined the faculty of the Weizmann Institute of Science, Israel. She has been a tenured associate professor since 2015 at the department of Molecular Genetics at the Weizmann Institute of Science and a full professor since 2020.

As of 2024, Schuldiner is a member of Molecular Systems Biology Editorial Board and of Life Science Alliance Advisory Editorial Boards. She received three consecutive European Research Council grants (StG in 2010, CoG in 2015 and in 2020). Schuldiner currently holds the Dr. Omenn and Martha Darling Professorial Chair in Molecular Genetics and currently (as of 2024), she serves as the Chair of the Weizmann Institute of Science “Scientific Council”. Throughout the years, she has been taking several other offices of academic administration at Weizmann Institute.

Schuldiner is married to Oren, a professor of molecular biology at the Weizmann Institute. They have three sons and reside at the institute. Her father-in-law, Shimon Schuldiner, is a professor emeritus of Biology at the Hebrew University of Jerusalem.

== Research ==
Schuldiner’s research focuses on uncovering functions for uncharacterized proteins using the bakers yeast as a central eukaryotic model. She does this by using high content screening approaches coupled with dedicated follow-ups and with an interest on processes that occur inside organelles.

=== Targeting proteins to organelles ===
About 50% of eukaryotic proteins are synthesized on cytosolic ribosomes and are subsequently targeted to specific organelles to perform their functions. Therefore, understanding how proteins reach their correct cellular destinations is a key aspect of cell biology. In recent years, her group has made several important discoveries in this field. During her postdoctoral research in the laboratory of Prof. Jonathan Weissman, and in collaboration with Prof. Blanche Schwappach, she discovered the GET (Guided Entry of Tail Anchor proteins) pathway, which targets Tail Anchor proteins and GPI anchor proteins to the Endoplasmic Reticulum (ER); they discovered the EMC complex (ER Membrane complex); defined a role for the protease Ste24 in clearing blocked translocation pores into the ER; identified a new targeting pathway to the ER, the SND (Srp iNDependent) pathway which they and others have then shown is also conserved in humans; discovered a new targeting receptor to peroxisomes, Pex9 and a new mechanism for proteins to co-translationally target to peroxisomal membranes. Together with the lab of Johannes Hermann, Schuldiner's group uncovered a new strategy for mitochondria membrane protein targeting by which such proteins use the ER membranes to "surf" until reaching their mitochondrial destination. They name this mode of targeting ER-SURF. In addition, her lab has demonstrated a plethora of unconventional targeting signals and targeting methods, and also mapped the substrate range for various translocation machineries.

=== Formation and function of contact sites ===
Organelle communication is instrumental in coordinating cellular function and maintaining homeostasis. One way by which organelles communicate is by forming contact sites of close apposition between their respective membranes. In the last years, Schuldiner's group has expanded the understanding in this field: discovering new contact sites and their tethers and functions such as the vacuole-mitochondria contact; the mitochondria-peroxisome contact, the inclusion body-lipid droplet contact, and the nucleus-mitochondria contact. They characterized the first contact site regulator; uncovered new functions for the ER-Mitochondria contact site; identified a new lipid droplet subpopulation sitting at defined cellular contact sites; recognized a new tether for the contact site between ER and Golgi membranes; and created a new tool to visualize contact sites and used it to systematically screen all contact sites for their resident proteins. Schuldiner's studies have dramatically increased the number of known contact sites, the tethers that form them, and their regulators as well as the molecules that transfer through these specialized domains.

== Awards ==
- 2011: EMBO Young Investigator award
- 2014: Selected as one of the most prominent "40 under 40" young scientists by "Cell" press
- 2014: Weizmann Institute of Science Scientific Council Prize
- 2015: Anniversary Prize, Federation of European Biochemical Societies
- 2017: National Prize, Federation of European Biochemical Societies
- 2017: EMBO Gold Medal
- 2017: Elected member of EMBO
- 2017–2018: Appointed as a TUM-IAS Hans Fischer Senior Fellow
- 2019: Jean Vance prize for breakthroughs in Contact Site research
- 2020: Elected member of the German National Academy of Sciences Leopoldina
- 2020: Ambassador, Technical University of Munich
- 2022: Ira Herskowitz Award for leading yeast geneticist
- 2023: FEBS Bucher medal
- 2023: Jean Vance prize for breakthroughs in Contact Site research
