= Schuldiner =

Schuldiner and Shuldiner is a surname sometimes found among Jewish people. It is popularly thought to mean gabbai, a synagogue sexton, although no evidence exists to justify this meaning. In Pennsylvania during the 18th century the term "shul diener" was used by German Christians in America to designate those who taught children and were literally "school servants" to people who could afford to hire them. Perhaps the most famous of these schul dieners was the American fractur artist, Johann Adam Eyer, who signed his name Johann Adam Eyer, S.D., for "Schul Diener". In all likelihood, Jewish schul dieners were rabbis who, like their Christian counterparts, were also teachers. Notable people with the surname include:

- Ben Shuldiner (born 1977), American social activist and educator
- Chuck Schuldiner (1967–2001), American guitarist and singer
- Maya Schuldiner (born 1975), Israeli biologist
- Michael Schuldiner, American literary historian
- Reed Shuldiner, American law professor
- Shimon Schuldiner (born 1946), Israeli biochemist
