= Gian-Paolo Dotto =

American-Swiss research er and professor

Gian-Paolo Dotto is an Italian researcher and professor at Massachusetts General Hospital, Boston (MA) and the University of Lausanne. His research focuses on genetic and epigenetic determinants of Cancer susceptibility and pre-malignant to malignant conversion.

== Career ==
Dotto obtained his medical degree in 1979 from the University of Turin, Italy and attained his PhD in Genetics at The Rockefeller University, New York, in 1983. In 1984, he pursued postdoctoral work at the Whitehead Institute/MIT in Cambridge Massachusetts. In 1987, he moved on to fulfill a position as assistant professor of Pathology at Yale University, New Haven, Connecticut.

In 1992, Dotto obtained a position of Associate Professor in the Cutaneous Biology Research Center (CBRC) at Massachusetts General Hospital and Harvard Medical School. In 2000 he obtained a full professorship in Dermatology at Harvard Medical School. Dotto became affiliated to the University of Lausanne (UNIL) as a Professor of Biochemistry in 2002, while maintaining a principal investigator position and active research laboratory at MGH. He directed the UNIL PhD program in Cancer and Immunology (2007-2019) and became an emeritus professor at UNIL in 2021. In 2016, he founded the International Cancer Prevention Institute (ICPI), of which he is the president. He is director of the Skin Aging and Cancer Prevention laboratory at CBRC/MGH and of the Head/Neck Personalized Cancer Prevention Program at Centre Hospitalier Universitaire Vaudois (CHUV) and UNIL.

== Research ==
During his doctoral studies in bacteriophage genetics with Norton Zinder at the Rockefeller University, he probed into control of DNA replication through specific DNA sequences and proteins. During his postdoctoral training with Robert Weinberg at the Whitehead Institute/MIT, Dotto was among the first to establish that multistep carcinogenesis results from an interplay between specific genetic alterations and the tumor microenvironment.

Research in his laboratory focuses on the role of intracellular and extracellular communication in early steps of cancer development with skin as model system. His group studies how alterations in key developmental (Notch/CSL) and hormonal (androgens) signaling pathways impinge on cancer cells of origin and intermingled cancer associated fibroblasts (CAFs) and the expansion and multifocality of cancer lesions over time (field cancerization). Additionally, his group focuses on genetic and epigenetic determinants of differences observed in cancer susceptibility across gender and race.

== Distinctions and awards ==
Dotto is a member of the European Molecular Biology Organization, the Academia Europaea, the German National Academy of Sciences Leopoldina, and a former Fellow of the Jane Coffin Childs Memorial Fund for Medical Research. He has received a lifetime achievement award in 2020 from the University of Lausanne. In 2013, he was the recipient of a European Research Council Advanced Investigator Grant, and in 2015, he was awarded the Jurg Tschopp Award for Excellence in Biological Sciences in 2015 from the University of Lausanne (Faculty Biology and Medicine).

== Outreach ==
In 2016, Dotto founded (and is director of) the international Cancer Prevention Institute together with Cathrin Brisken. Through this institute he assembles educators, policy makers and the general public to foster joint interdisciplinary efforts focused on cancer prevention. He has organized courses and workshops focused on cancer prevention and installed a collaborative PhD program focusing on cancer prevention (Marie Skłodowska-Curie Actions (MSCA) Innovative Training Network (ITN)) in 2019.

Dotto has been contributing articles for L'Osservatore Romano and the Science and Society section of EMBO Reports. Additionally, he has dedicated a website to promote dialogue between natural sciences and humanities, and has recently published a book entitled "Death and Resurrection: An experiment in progress".
