= JGP =

JGP may refer to:

- ISU Junior Grand Prix, a figure skating competition
- Jamison Gibson-Park, an Irish rugby union player
- Japanese Grand Prix, a Formula One automobile race
- The Journal of General Physiology
- Jean-Gabriel Pageau, a Canadian ice hockey player
- Johnny G. Plate, an Indonesian politician
