= John Douglas Swales =

English cardiologist (1935–2000)

- Born: 19 October 1935; Leicester, England, UK
- Died: 17 October 2000 (aged 64); Leicester, England, UK
- Known for: founding editorship of the Journal of Hypertension

John Douglas Swales FRCP FMedSci (1935–2000) was an English cardiologist, professor of medicine, medical journal editor, and internationally recognised expert on hypertension.

After secondary education in Leicester, John Douglas Swales was awarded a scholarship to the University of Cambridge and graduated in 1957 from Clare College, Cambridge with first class honours. He then studied medicine at the Westminster Hospital Medical School and in 1961 graduated MB BChir from the University of Cambridge. From 1961 to 1968 he held junior medical appointments. From 1968 to 1970 he was a research fellow at the Royal Postgraduate Medical School. From 1970 to 1974 he was a senior lecturer at the medical school of the University of Manchester, where he was mentored by Sir Douglas Black. Swales qualified in 1964 MRCP and graduated in 1971 with the higher MD degree from the University of Cambridge.

In 1974, he was invited to become the Foundation Professor and Chairman of Medicine at the new medical school at the University of Leicester. ... He served as Chairman of Medicine from 1974 until 1996 ...

He was elected FRCP in 1977 and FMedSci in 1998. The Royal College of Physicians appointed him Bradshaw Lecturer in 1987, Croonian Lecturer in 1991, and Harveian Orator in 1995.

Swales was editor-in-chief of Clinical Science from 1980 to 1982, the Journal of Hypertension (from its founding in 1982 to 1987), and the Journal of the Royal Society of Medicine in 1994. He served on the editorial boards of many journals, including Hypertension and The Lancet. He was also editor-in-chief of the Textbook of Hypertension (Oxford, Blackwell Scientific, 1994). He was elected a fellow of the American Council for High Blood Pressure Research and an honorary fellow of the Australian Blood Pressure Council. In 1980–1981 he assisted in the foundation of the British Hypertension Society (renamed in 2016 the British and Irish Hypertension Society) and served as its second president.

Swales went to London in 1996 to become national director of the National Health Service Research and Development programme. Three years later he retired and returned to Leicester.

On 7 October 1967 in Kensington, London, he married Kathleen Patricia (nicknamed "Dooney") Townsend (b. 1942). Their son Philip Patrick Richard Swales (b. 1972) became a physician in Leicester. Their daughter Charlotte Rachel Swales (b. 1975) became a chartered accountant in London.

== Selected publications ==
- Swales, J. D. (1979). "Editorial review. Arterial wall or plasma renin in hypertension?" (PDF). Clinical Science. 56 (4): 293–298. doi:10.1042/cs0560293. S2CID 33980862. Archived from the original (PDF) on 19 January 2019.
- with N. J. Samani and W. J. Brammar: Samani, N. J.; Swales, J. D.; Brammar, W. J. (1 August 1988). "Expression of the renin gene in extra-renal tissues of the rat". Biochemical Journal. 253 (3): 907–910. doi:10.1042/bj2530907. PMC 1149388. PMID 3052427.
- Swales, J. D. (2 November 1991). "Salt substitutes and potassium intake". BMJ. 303 (6810): 1084–1085. doi:10.1136/bmj.303.6810.1084. PMC 1671298. PMID 1747573.
- Swales, J. D. (December 1991). "Editorial. Antihypertensive drugs and plasma lipids". Br Heart J. 66 (6): 409–410. doi:10.1136/hrt.66.6.409. PMC 1024812. PMID 1772705.
