= Dotto (disambiguation) =

Dotto may refer to:

== People ==
- Dave Del Dotto, a former real estate investor from Modesto, California
- Francesca Dotto (born 1993), an Italian basketball player
- Gian-Paolo Dotto, Italian researcher
- Jean Dotto (1928–2000), first French racing cyclist to win the Vuelta a España
- Luca Dotto (born 1990), an Italian swimmer
- Lydia Dotto (1949–2022), Canadian science journalist and author
- Piermassimiliano Dotto (1970–2012), Italian rugby union player
- Saint Dotto, an early Scottish saint

== Other ==
- Dotto, a 1958 American television game show
- Dotto train, a genericized trademark for a trackless train
- Dotto! Koni-chan, a Japanese anime television series
