= Journal of Molecular and Cellular Cardiology =

- Discipline: Molecular and cellular cardiology
- Language: English
- Edited by: Rong Tian

Publication details
- History: 1970–present
- Publisher: Elsevier
- Frequency: Monthly
- Open access: Hybrid
- Impact factor: 5.0 (2022)

Standard abbreviations
- ISO 4: J. Mol. Cell. Cardiol.

Indexing
- CODEN: JMCDAY
- ISSN: 0022-2828
- LCCN: 71023381
- OCLC no.: 884598618

Links
- Journal homepage; Online access; Online archive

The Journal of Molecular and Cellular Cardiology is a monthly peer-reviewed medical journal covering molecular and cellular aspects of cardiology. The journal was established in 1970 by Richard Bing and Lionel Opie and is published by Elsevier. It is the official journal of The International Society for Heart Research. The editor-in-chief is Rong Tian (University of Washington). Previous editors-in-chief include:

- Richard Bing & Lionel Opie (1970-1977)
- Richard Bing (1978-1979)
- Lionel Opie, Cape Town, South Africa (1980-1986)
- Arnold M. Katz, Farmington, CT, USA (1987-1992)
- Norman Alpert, Burlington, VT, USA (1993-1998).
- Richard Walsh, Cleveland, OH, USA (1999-2007)
- David Eisner, Manchester, UK (2008-2016)
- R. John Solaro, University of Illinois at Chicago (2017-2019)

== Abstracting and indexing ==
The journal is abstracted and indexed in:

- Academic Search Premier
- BIOSIS Previews
- Chemical Abstracts
- EMBASE
- EMBiology
- MEDLINE
- Scopus
- Science Citation Index

According to the Journal Citation Reports, the journal 2022 impact factor is 5.0.
