= David A. Eisner =

David Eisner
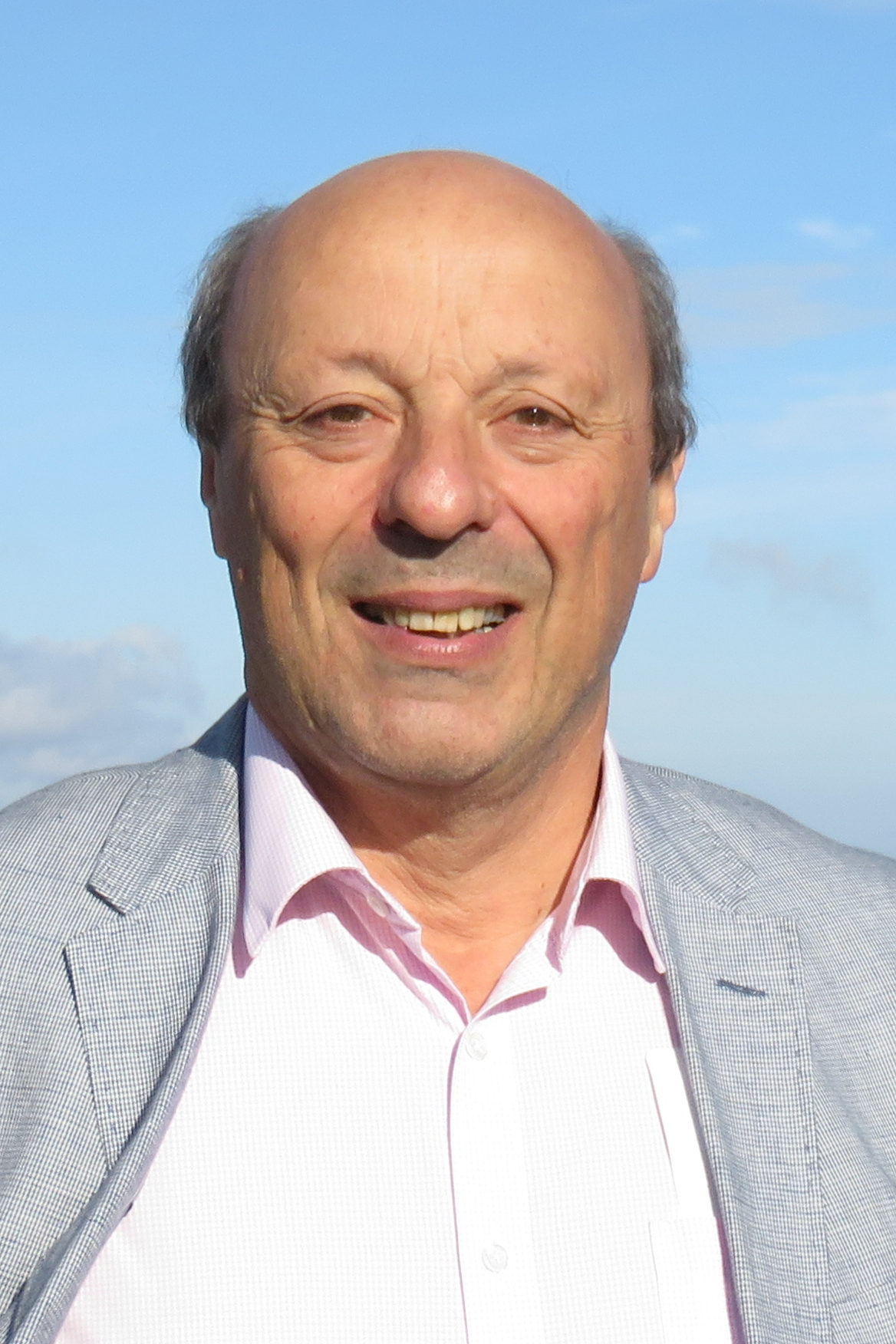
- David A. Eisner in 2016
- Born: David Alfred Eisner; 3 January 1955 (age 71); Manchester
- Awards: Physiological Society Annual Review Prize Lecture (2017)
- Scientific career
- Workplaces: University College London, University of Liverpool, University of Manchester
- Thesis: The effects of sodium pump inhibition on the electrical and mechanical properties of mammalian cardiac muscle. (1979)
- Doctoral advisor: Denis Noble

David Alfred Eisner, FRCP (Hon), FMedSci, (born 3 January 1955) is British Heart Foundation Professor of Cardiac Physiology at the University of Manchester and editor-in-chief of The Journal of General Physiology (JGP).

== Education ==
Eisner was born in 1955 in Manchester, the son of the physicist and writer Herbert Eisner. After attending Manchester Grammar School, he received his B.A. in natural sciences at King's College, Cambridge in 1976. In 1979 he obtained a D.Phil. in physiology at Oxford University in the laboratory of Denis Noble for work on the sodium pump in cardiac muscle.

== Career ==
Following postdoctoral research at the University of Cambridge on the kinetics of the sodium pump in the laboratory of Ian Glynn, he took up a lectureship in the Department of Physiology at University College London in 1980. In 1990 he moved to The University of Liverpool as professor of veterinary biology. In 1999 he took up a chair of cardiac physiology at the University of Manchester and, in 2000, was awarded the BHF Chair of Cardiac Physiology.

Eisner was chair of the editorial board of The Journal of Physiology from 1997 to 2000 and editor-in chief of the Journal of Molecular and Cellular Cardiology from 2007 to 2016. He was president of The Federation of European Physiological Societies (FEPS) from 2011-2015 and The Physiological Society from 2016 to 2018.

== Research ==
Eisner's early research focused on the regulation of intracellular sodium in cardiac muscle and the effects on contraction. He then investigated the control of intracellular calcium concentration and its role in the production of arrhythmias. He has identified the factors that regulate the calcium content of the sarcoplasmic reticulum and how this is altered in disease. His recent research has focused on the control of diastolic calcium and the effects of calcium buffering. He has also written and spoken about scientific reproducibility and fraud. He is interested in the misuse of statistics and, together with Jakub Tomek, he has written a book on Biomedical Statistics as well as a paper on equivalence testing

== Personal life ==
Eisner is married to Susan Wray, professor of cellular and molecular physiology at the University of Liverpool, with whom he has three children.

== Honours and awards ==
Eisner was elected as a Fellow of The Academy of Medical Sciences in 1999 and The International Society for Heart Research in 2001. and as a Member of Academia Europaea in 2007. He was elected to Honorary Fellowship of The Royal College of Physicians in 2010. In 2026 he was elected as a Fellow of the International Union of Physiological Sciences. In 2018 he received an honorary doctorate, Doctor Honoris Causa, from The University of Debrecen. and, in 2021 from The University of Szeged. Prizes awarded to him include: The GL Brown and Annual Review Lecture of The Physiological Society; the Keith Reimer Lecture and the Peter Harris Distinguished Scientist Award of the International Society for Heart Research; the Carmeliet-Coraboeuf-Weidmann Lecture of the European Working Group on Cardiac Cellular Electrophysiology; the Fabio Ruzzier Lecture of The Italian Physiological Society. He has also delivered the Burdon-Sanderson Lecture (Oxford) in 2013.
