= JMCC =

JMCC may refer to:

- Jerusalem Media & Communication Centre, a Palestinian organization which provides information about the West Bank and in Gaza.
- Journal of Molecular and Cellular Cardiology
- Jurupa Mountains Cultural Center, the previous name of the Jurupa Mountains Discovery Center in Jurupa Valley, California
