= Frank Gannon (disambiguation) =

Frank Gannon is an Irish molecular biologist.

Frank Gannon may also refer to:

- Frank Gannon, aide to U.S. President Richard Nixon and NBC television producer who had a relationship with Diane Sawyer
- Frank Gannon, co-founder in 1993 of Tugan Aircraft
- Frank Gannon, P.I. P.I., fictional character in the television program Saturday Night Live
