= The EMBO Journal =

- Discipline: Molecular biology
- Language: English
- Edited by: Facundo D. Batista

Publication details
- History: 1982–present
- Publisher: EMBO Press
- Frequency: Semi-monthly
- Open access: Delayed, after 12 months
- Impact factor: 8.2 (2024)

Standard abbreviations
- ISO 4: EMBO J.

Indexing
- CODEN: EMJ0DG
- ISSN: 0261-4189 (print); 1460-2075 (web)
- LCCN: 82643856
- OCLC no.: 08335096

Links
- Journal homepage; Online access; Online archive

The EMBO Journal is a semi-monthly peer-reviewed scientific journal focusing on full-length papers describing original research of general interest in molecular biology and related areas. The editor-in-chief is Facundo D. Batista (Harvard Medical School).

== History ==
The journal was established in 1982 and was published by Nature Publishing Group on behalf of the European Molecular Biology Organization until the launch of EMBO Press in 2013.

== Abstracting and indexing ==
The journal is abstracted and indexed in:

- Aquatic Sciences and Fisheries Abstracts
- Biological Abstracts
- BIOSIS Previews
- CAB Abstracts
- Chemical Abstracts Service
- Current Contents/Life Sciences
- EBSCO databases
- Embase
- Index Medicus/MEDLINE/PubMed
- Science Citation Index Expanded
- Scopus

According to the Journal Citation Reports, the journal has a 2024 impact factor of 8.2.

== See also ==
- EMBO Reports
- Molecular Systems Biology
