= Para Fuera =

- Directed by: Nick Jasenovec
- Produced by: Sean Carver, Eric Hadley, Loretta Jeneski, Michael Degan
- Starring: Richard Bing
- Edited by: Ryan Brown
- Music by: Richard Bing, Ludwig van Beethoven
- Production company: NonFiction Unlimited
- Release date: January 25, 2010 (Sundance)
- Running time: 9:16
- Country: United States
- Language: English

Para Fuera: A Portrait of Dr. Richard J. Bing is a 2010 short documentary film about Dr. Richard J. Bing on his hundredth birthday. The film was written and directed by award-winning director Nicholas Jasenovec and executive producers Sean Carver, Eric Hadley, Loretta Jeneski, and Michael Degan.

The film was conceptualized when Dr. Richard Bing learned of Microsoft's new search engine Bing, and wrote a letter to Microsoft about his life and upcoming 100th birthday. Sean Carver, Director of Brand Entertainment at Bing and Stefan Weitz, Director, Influentials at Bing traveled to La Canada, CA to meet Dr. Bing. After meeting him, it was apparent he had much to tell about the remarkable decisions he had made in his life, the sacrifices, struggles, successes, and ultimate wisdom of a man who has achieved so much over the last century. Deciding to capitalize on the opportunity to share Dr. Bing's story, Sean Carver enlisted Creative Artists Agency and ultimately director Nick Jasenovec for the project.

Para Fuera was shot from July 2009 to August 2009 before premiering as an Official Selection of the 2010 Sundance Film Festival on January 25, 2010. It was also awarded the Silver Medal in the "Film Documentary" category by The One Show Entertainment Awards in 2010.

Richard Bing died on November 8, 2010, at age 101.
