= EMBO Molecular Medicine =

- Discipline: Molecular medicine
- Language: English
- Edited by: Philippe Sansonetti

Publication details
- History: 2009–present
- Publisher: EMBO Press on behalf of the European Molecular Biology Organization
- Frequency: Continuous
- Open access: Yes
- License: Creative Commons Attribution License
- Impact factor: 7.9 (2025)

Standard abbreviations
- ISO 4: EMBO Mol. Med.

Indexing
- ISSN: 1757-4676 (print); 1757-4684 (web)
- LCCN: 2009243409
- OCLC no.: 971953346

Links
- Journal homepage; Online access; Online archive

EMBO Molecular Medicine is an open-access peer-reviewed medical journal covering research in molecular medicine.

The journal was published by Wiley-Blackwell together with the European Molecular Biology Organization since its launch in 2009, until December 2013, when EMBO Press was started. According to the Journal Citation Reports, the journal had a 2025 impact factor of 7.9.
