= Rockefeller University Press =

Academic press of the Rockefeller University

- Parent company: Rockefeller University
- Founded: 1910
- Founder: Simon Flexner
- Country of origin: United States
- Headquarters location: New York City
- Publication types: Academic journals
- Nonfiction topics: Science
- Official website: www.rupress.org

The Rockefeller University Press (RUP) is a department of Rockefeller University.

== Journals ==
Rockefeller University Press publishes three scientific journals: Journal of Experimental Medicine, founded in 1896, Journal of General Physiology, founded in 1918, and Journal of Cell Biology, founded in 1955 under the title The Journal of Biophysical and Biochemical Cytology. All editorial decisions on manuscripts submitted to the three journals are made by active scientists in conjunction with in-house scientific editors, and all peer-review operations and pre-press production functions are carried out at the Rockefeller University Press offices. In 2018, Rockefeller University Press partnered with EMBO Press and Cold Spring Harbor Laboratory Press to launch the "Life Science Alliance" journal.

== Focus ==
Rockefeller University Press places a strong emphasis on preserving the integrity of primary research data, and it is a pioneer in the application of new technologies to achieve that goal.

== Open access policy ==
Rockefeller University Press provides public access to the articles it publishes. All content of Journal of Experimental Medicine, Journal of Cell Biology, and Journal of General Physiology (back to volume 1, issue 1) is hosted on Silverchair and PubMed Central, where it is available to the public for free 6 months after publication under a Creative Commons license. Some content is published Open Access immediately upon publication under a CC-BY license.

== See also ==
- List of English-language book publishing companies
- List of university presses
