= Arnold Martin Katz =

American cardiologist

Arnold Martin Katz (July 30, 1932 – January 25, 2016) was an American medical doctor, professor of cardiology, medical researcher, and author of medical textbooks and research articles.

== Career ==
Arnold Katz was born in Chicago, Illinois. His mother was a piano teacher. His father, Louis N. Katz M.D. was a cardiologist, winner of the Lasker Award and president of the American Physiological Society and American Heart Association. Katz attended the University of Chicago and earned a Bachelor of Arts in 1952. He graduated as a medical doctor from Harvard Medical School in 1956, and did his medical internship at the Massachusetts General Hospital, where he also served as medical assistant resident in 1959. He spent 1957-1958 studying protein chemistry in the Laboratory of Christian B. Anfinsen at the National Institutes of Health in Bethesda. Katz later worked in medical research at the University of California at Los Angeles and the Columbia University in New York, becoming an established investigator of the American Heart Association. In 1969 Katz became the first Philip J. and Harriet L. Goodhart Professor of Medicine (Cardiology) at the Mount Sinai School of Medicine. In 1977 he moved to the University of Connecticut School of Medicine to become the first chief of cardiology. Since his retirement in 1998 he has been acting as visiting professor of Medicine and Physiology at Dartmouth Medical School. In 2008 he was also appointed Visiting Professor of Medicine at Harvard Medical School.

Katz published over 400 articles and edited or co-edited more than 15 books. His single-authored text Physiology of the Heart is now in its 5th edition. Katz is the recipient of various awards including the 1975 Humboldt Prize, the Research Achievement Award of the American Heart Association, the Peter Harris Distinguished Scientist Award of the International Society for Heart Research, the Lifetime Achievement Award of the Heart Failure Society of America, and the Medal of Merit of the International Academy of Cardiovascular Sciences. The American Heart Association renamed its young investigator award for basic research the Louis N. and Arnold M. Katz Prize in his honour. Among his many contributions, Katz was the first to describe the protein Phospholamban.

Katz died at his home in Norwich, Vermont on January 25, 2016. He is survived by his wife of 56 years, Phyllis B. Katz, and their 4 children and 8 grandchildren.

== Publications (incomplete list) ==
- Physiology of the Heart
- Heart Failure: Pathophysiology, Molecular Biology, Clinical Management
- Effects of acetate and other short-chain fatty acids on yeast metabolism
- Regulation of myocardial contractility 1958-1983: an odyssey
- Regulation of coronary flow.
- Registration of left ventricular volume curves in the dog with the systemic circulation intact.
- Peptide separation by two-dimensional chromatography and electrophoresis.
- Katz AM, Chernoff AI (1959). "Structural similarities between hemoglobins A and F.". Science. 130 (3388): 1574–1576. Bibcode:1959Sci...130.1574K. doi:10.1126/science.130.3388.1574. PMID 14404785. S2CID 40013191.
- Influence of tropomyosin upon the reactions of actomyosin at low ionic strength.
- Purification and properties of a tropomyosin-containing protein fraction that sensitizes reconstituted actomyosin to calcium-binding agents.
- Control of the activity of highly purified cardiac actomyosin by Ca++, Na+ and K+.
- Katz AM, Repke DI (1967). "Quantitative aspects of dog cardiac microsomal calcium binding and calcium uptake". Circulation Research. 21 (2): 153–162. doi:10.1161/01.res.21.2.153. PMID 4952707.
- Kirchberger MA, Tada M, Repke DI, Katz AM (1972). "Cyclic adenosine 3', 5'-monophosphate-dependent protein kinase stimulation of calcium uptake by canine cardiac microsomes". J Mol Cell Cardiol. 4 (6): 673–680. doi:10.1016/0022-2828(72)90120-4. PMID 4347149.
- Tada M, Kirchberger MA, Katz AM (1975). "Phosphorylation of a 22,000-dalton component of the cardiac sarcoplasmic reticulum by adenosine 3', 5'-monophosphate-dependent protein kinase". J Biol Chem. 250 (7): 2640–2647. doi:10.1016/S0021-9258(19)41650-5. PMID 235523.
- Katz AM, Repke DI, Dunnett J, Hasselbach W (1977). "Dependence of calcium permeability of sarcoplasmic reticulum vesicles on external and internal calcium ion concentrations". J Biol Chem. 252 (6): 1950–1956. doi:10.1016/S0021-9258(18)71849-8. PMID 403187.
- Hicks MJ, Shigekawa M, Katz AM (1979). "Mechanism by which cyclic adenosine 3', 5'-monophosphate-dependent protein kinase stimulates calcium transport in cardiac sarcoplasmic reticulum". Circulation Research. 44 (3): 384–391. doi:10.1161/01.res.44.3.384. PMID 216505.
- Shigekawa M, Dougherty JP, Katz AM (1978). "Reaction mechanism of Ca2+-dependent ATP hydrolysis by skeletal muscle sarcoplasmic reticulum in the absence of added alkali metal salts. I. Characterization of steady state ATP hydrolysis and comparison with that in the presence of KCl". J Biol Chem. 253 (5): 1442–1450. doi:10.1016/S0021-9258(17)34886-X. PMID 627548.
- Takenaka H, Adler PN, Katz AM (1982). "Calcium fluxes across the membrane of sarcoplasmic reticulum vesicles". J Biol Chem. 257 (21): 12649–12656. doi:10.1016/S0021-9258(18)33560-9. PMID 6215402.
- Katz AM, Adler PN, Watras J, Messineo FC, Takenaka H, Louis CF (1982). "Fatty acid effects on calcium influx and efflux in sarcoplasmic reticulum vesicles from rabbit skeletal muscle". Biochim Biophys Acta. 687 (1): 17–26. doi:10.1016/0005-2736(82)90165-1. PMID 7074105.
- Herbette LG, Katz AM, Sturtevant JM (1983). "Comparisons of the interaction of propranolol and timolol with model and biological membrane systems". Mol Pharmacol. 24 (2): 259–269. PMID 6888369.
- Herbette LG, Trumbore M, Chester DW, Katz AM (1988). "Possible molecular basis for the pharmacodynamics of three membrane active drugs: propranolol, nimodipine, amiodarone". J Mol Cell Cardiol. 20 (5): 373–378. doi:10.1016/s0022-2828(88)80128-7. PMID 3210248.
- Katz AM (1965). "The descending limb of the Starling Curve and the failing heart". Circulation. 32 (6): 871–875. doi:10.1161/01.cir.32.6.871. PMID 5321024.
- Katz AM "Biochemical "defect" in the hypertrophied and failing heart. Deleterious or compensatory" Circulation 1973;1076-1079.
- Katz AM, Hecht HH (1969). "The early "pump" failure of the ischemic heart". Am J Med. 47 (4): 497–502. doi:10.1016/0002-9343(69)90180-6. PMID 4241836.
- Katz AM, Tada M (1972). "The "Stone Heart": A challenge to the biochemist". Am J Cardiol. 29 (4): 578–580. doi:10.1016/0002-9149(72)90455-9. PMID 5016841.
- Katz AM, Reuter H (1979). "Cellular calcium and cardiac cell death". Am J Cardiol. 44 (1): 188–190. doi:10.1016/0002-9149(79)90270-4. PMID 36745.
- Katz AM (1978). "A new inotropic drug: Its promise and a caution". N Engl J Med. 299 (25): 1409–1410. doi:10.1056/nejm197812212992508. PMID 714118.
- Katz AM. "Potential deleterious effects of inotropic agents in the therapy of heart failure. Circulation 1986;73(Suppl III):184-190.
- Katz AM (1988). "Molecular biology in cardiology, a paradigmatic shift". J Mol Cell Cardiol. 20 (4): 355–366. doi:10.1016/s0022-2828(88)80069-5. PMID 3050135.
- Katz AM (1990). "Cardiomyopathy of overload. A major determinant of prognosis in congestive heart failure". N Engl J Med. 322 (2): 100–110. doi:10.1056/nejm199001113220206. PMID 2403651.
- Katz AM (1990). "Angiotensin II: Hemodynamic regulator or growth factor?". J Mol Cell Cardiol. 22 (7): 739–747. doi:10.1016/0022-2828(90)90086-H. PMID 2231742.
- Katz AM, Katz PB (1989). "Homogeneity out of heterogeneity". Circulation. 79 (3): 712–717. doi:10.1161/01.cir.79.3.712. PMID 2917394.
- Katz AM (1992). "T Wave "Memory": Possible causal relationship to stress-induced changes in cardiac ion channels?". J Cardiovasc Electrophysiol. 3 (2): 150–159. doi:10.1111/j.1540-8167.1992.tb01104.x. S2CID 145397770.
- Katz AM (1992). "Heart Failure in 2001: A prophesy". Am J Cardiol. 70 (10): 126C – 131C. doi:10.1016/0002-9149(92)91370-j. PMID 1414889.
- Katz AM (2001). "Heart Failure in 2001. A prophesy revisited". Am J Cardiol. 87 (12): 1383–1386. doi:10.1016/s0002-9149(01)01557-0. PMID 11397358.
- Katz AM (2008). "The "modern" view of heart failure: How did we get here?". Circ Heart Fail. 1 (1): 63–71. doi:10.1161/circheartfailure.108.772756. PMID 19808272.
- Katz AM (2008). "The "gap" between bench and bedside: Widening or narrowing". J Cardiac Failure. 14 (2): 91–94. doi:10.1016/j.cardfail.2007.10.012. PMID 18325453.
