= Journal of Experimental Medicine =

- Discipline: Medicine
- Language: English

Publication details
- History: 1896–present
- Publisher: Rockefeller University Press (United States)
- Frequency: Monthly
- Open access: Delayed, after 6 months
- License: Creative Commons Attribution-Noncommercial-Share Alike 3.0 Unported
- Impact factor: 10.4 (2024)

Standard abbreviations
- ISO 4: J. Exp. Med.

Indexing
- CODEN: JEMEAV
- ISSN: 0022-1007 (print); 1540-9538 (web)
- LCCN: 06036096
- OCLC no.: 01390073

Links
- Journal homepage; Online access; Online archive

Journal of Experimental Medicine is a monthly peer-reviewed medical journal published by Rockefeller University Press that publishes research papers and commentaries on the physiological, pathological, and molecular mechanisms that encompass the host response to disease. The journal prioritizes studies on intact organisms and has made a commitment to publishing studies on human subjects. Topics covered include immunology, inflammation, infectious disease, hematopoiesis, cancer, stem cells and vascular biology. The journal has no single editor-in-chief, but thirteen academic editors.

== History ==
The journal was established in 1896 at the Johns Hopkins School of Medicine by William H. Welch, the school's founder and also the first president of the Board of Scientific Directors of the Rockefeller Institute (since renamed Rockefeller University). From its inception, Welch edited the journal by himself—even editing manuscripts while attending baseball games. By March 1902, the editorial burden became too great for Welch, who stopped publishing papers and began stockpiling manuscripts and unanswered correspondence in his office, explaining the conspicuous absence of published papers from 1902 to 1904.

In October 1902, Welch appealed to the board of the Rockefeller Institute to take over the journal. The transfer of ownership and publication responsibilities required the physical transfer of manuscripts from Welch's office, which fell to the director of the Rockefeller Institute, Simon Flexner, who carried the abandoned manuscripts from Baltimore to New York City in a suitcase.

The first issue published by the Rockefeller Institute appeared in February 1905, with Flexner serving as editor, and the journal has been published regularly since then. Although the journal was adopted by the Rockefeller Institute as a venue for publication of the institute's own research, it also accepted submissions from outside. Even in the early years, more than half of the papers published in the journal came from external labs.

== Online access ==
An online archive of articles back to 1896 is available in text and PDF formats (material from 1996 and earlier is only available in PDF). Material over six months old is freely accessible and access to all papers is also provided free of charge to developing countries. All content is also deposited in PubMed Central, where it is available to the public six months after publication. Copyright to articles remains with the authors and third parties may re-use content after 6 months under the terms of a Creative Commons Attribution-Noncommercial-Share Alike 3.0 Unported license.

== Impact factor ==
According to the Journal Citation Reports, the journal received a 2024 impact factor of 10.4, ranking it seventh out of 177 journals in the category "Immunology" and fourth out of 189 journals in the category "Medicine, Research & Experimental".
