= Journal of Hypertension =

- Discipline: Cardiology
- Language: English
- Edited by: Anthony M. Heagerty

Publication details
- History: 1982–present
- Publisher: Lippincott Williams & Wilkins
- Frequency: Monthly
- Impact factor: 4.844 (2020)

Standard abbreviations
- ISO 4: J. Hypertens.

Indexing
- CODEN: JOHYD3
- ISSN: 0263-6352 (print); 1473-5598 (web)
- OCLC no.: 9766054

Links
- Journal homepage

Journal of Hypertension is a peer-reviewed medical journal published by Lippincott Williams & Wilkins that was established in 1982. It is the official journal of the International Society of Hypertension and the European Society of Hypertension. The journal is published monthly and includes primary papers, reviews, special reports, and letters.

Since 2021, the editor-in-chief is Anthony M. Heagerty (Manchester, United Kingdom). From 2018 to 2021, the EIC was Giuseppe Mancia. According to the Journal Citation Reports, the journal has a 2020 impact factor of 4.844.
