= Maria Leptin =

German developmental biologist and immunologist (born 1954)

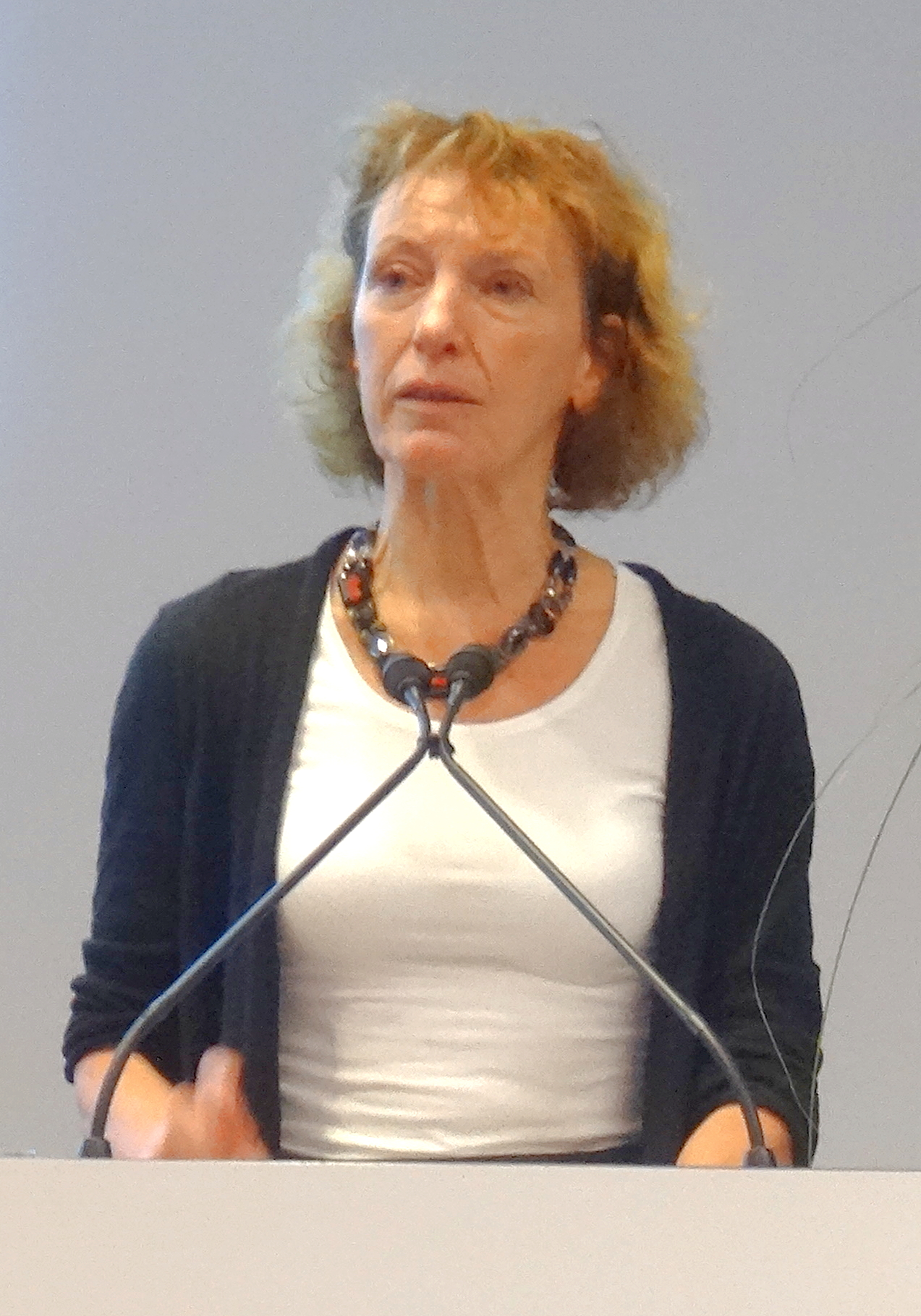
- Leptin in Heidelberg, 2017

President of the European Research Council
- Incumbent
- Assumed office 1 November 2021
- Preceded by: Jean-Pierre Bourguignon (interim)

Director of the European Molecular Biology Organization
- In office 1 January 2010 – 30 October 2021
- Preceded by: Hermann Bujard
- Succeeded by: Fiona Watt

Personal details
- Born: 15 September 1954 (age 72) Hamburg, Germany
- Spouse: Jonathan Howard
- Children: 2
- Education: Basel Institute for Immunology; Heidelberg University; University of Bonn
- Profession: professor at the University of Cologne (1994-present)
- Scientific career
- Fields: Developmental biology Immunology
- Workplaces: European Molecular Biology Organization; European Molecular Biology Laboratory; University of Cologne; Max Planck Institute for Developmental Biology; MRC Laboratory of Molecular Biology
- Thesis: (1983)
- Doctoral advisor: Fritz Melchers

Maria Leptin (born 15 September 1954) is a German developmental biologist and immunologist, and the current president of the European Research Council. She was the director of the European Molecular Biology Organization from 2010 to 2021.

== Education ==
Leptin studied mathematics and biology at the University of Bonn and the Heidelberg University. Initially planning to become a teacher, she decided to pursue a PhD in 1979 at the Basel Institute for Immunology after a practical taught by researchers from the institute. She was supervised by Fritz Melchers and studied B-cell activation and maturation into plasma cells as part of the immune response to infections. She completed her PhD in 1983.

== Career ==
=== Academic research and teaching positions ===
After her PhD, in 1984, Leptin joined Michael Wilcox's group at the MRC Laboratory of Molecular Biology (LMB) in Cambridge as a postdoctoral fellow. It is here that she became involved in developmental biology, studying the role of position-specific integrins in the embryonic development of Drosophila. In 1988, she became a staff scientist at LMB.

Leptin's years at LMB raised her interest in cell shape, early cell movement and gastrulation, the last of which she began researching in 1989 during her brief stay at Patrick O'Farrell's group at the University of California, San Francisco as a guest scientist. Afterwards she moved to the Max Planck Institute for Developmental Biology in Tübingen, Germany, leading a research group focused on gastrulation until 1994 when she became a professor at the University of Cologne, Institute of Genetics, a position she is still holding. She is also leading a research group at Cologne, which initially continued her study on gastrulation, but later shifted to the development of the Drosophila respiratory system. Eventually, Leptin started using zebrafish as a model organism to study the innate immune response.

Subsequently, she had two more experiences as a visiting professor, the first at the École Normale Supérieure in Paris in 2001 and the second as visiting scientist at the Wellcome Sanger Institute in UK between 2004 and 2005.

In 2009, Leptin was appointed the director of the European Molecular Biology Organization, a role she took up in January 2010. She also set up a research group at the European Molecular Biology Laboratory in Heidelberg, which studies the factors determining cell shape in Drosophila and the in vivo imaging of innate immune response in zebrafish.

Leptin had a stay at the University of Oxford in 2018, where she was a visiting professor of Cell and Developmental Biology.

=== Presidency of the European Research Council ===
In June 2021, Leptin was appointed as the next president of the European Research Council, starting from 1 October 2021. It was announced in September, however, that she would delay taking up the new role to 1 November. Unexpected changes to the grant schemes announced by Leptin — including barring most unsuccessful applicants from reapplying for minimum two years — have drawn criticism, with scholars, including various ERC panel members, arguing that these measures undermine the ERC’s mission, exclude innovative scientists, and weaken Europe’s global competitiveness in basic research.

=== Extra-academic positions ===
Other than academic appointments, Leptin was the president of the German Society for Developmental Biology from 1996 to 1997, a member of the advisory board of the German Genetics Society from 2008 to 2012, the president of the Initiative for Science in Europe from 2012 to 2017. She was also a member of the board of trustees of the Max Delbrück Center for Molecular Medicine in the Helmholtz Association from 2004 to 2009 and of the Babraham Institute between 2006 and 2009. She served on the editorial board of Developmental Biology from 1996 to 2001 and Developmental Cell since 2001, as well as a co-editor of Mechanisms of Development and Gene Expression Patterns between 2002 and 2009.

=== Academic advisory and administrative positions ===
She is currently sitting on the Scientific Advisory Board of the Max Planck Institute of Molecular Cell Biology and Genetics, of the Mechanobiology Institute, National University of Singapore, and of the Institute of Molecular Biotechnology, as well as on the University Council of the University of Cologne. She is also one of the directors of the Christiane Nüsslein-Volhard Foundation.

== Honours and awards ==
- Member of the European Molecular Biology Organisation (1996)
- Member of Academia Europaea (1998)
- Corresponding Member of the North Rhine-Westphalian Academy of Sciences, Humanities and the Arts (2010)
- Member of the German National Academy of Sciences Leopoldina (2016)
- Honorary Fellow of the Academy of Medical Sciences (2017)
- Foreign Member of the Royal Society (2022)
