= Giuseppe Mancia =

Italian physician

Giuseppe Mancia (born July 26 1940) is an Italian physician and academic who is a professor emeritus of medicine at the University of Milano-Bicocca. He has worked on arterial hypertension, particularly in out-of-office blood pressure monitoring, cardiovascular control mechanisms ,cardiovascular risk assessment, and antihypertensive therapy.

He has served as president of the International Society of Hypertension,the European Society of Hypertension and the European Society of Clinical Investigation. He is the recipient of Commander of the Order of Merit of the Italian Republic.

== Biography ==
He was born in Carrara, Tuscany, Italy. Mancia completed his secondary education at the Liceo Classico in Teramo. He trained at the University of Siena Medical School, graduating cum laude in 1964. In 1967, he obtained a postgraduate diploma in cardiology and rheumatic diseases, also cum laude. He was awarded the Libera Docenza (PhD) in Physiology in 1970 and subsequently served as a U.S. Public Health Service postdoctoral fellow and research associate at the Mayo Clinic from 1972 to 1974.

== Career ==
Mancia began his academic career at the University of Milan, where he progressed from assistant professor to full professor of medicine. He later served as Chair of Internal Medicine at San Gerardo Hospital in Monza, first within the University of Milan and subsequently at the University of Milano-Bicocca, where he remained until 2012. From 1998 to 2012, he was Chairman of the Hospital Department of Medicine at San Gerardo Hospital.

At Milano-Bicocca, Mancia held leaderships roles, including Chairman of the University Department of Clinical Medicine, Director of postgraduate schools in internal medicine, cardiology, and emergency medicine, and Director of the interuniversity(Milan and Pavia Universities) research center focused on clinical physiology and hypertension. IHe was appointed Professor Emeritus by the Italian Ministry of University and Scientific Research.

He has chaired or co-chaired multiple ESH/ESC and WHO/ISH task forces, including the European guidelines on hypertension. Since 2013, he has served as President of the Foundation of the European Society of Hypertension, and he is Honorary President of the Joint Board of the Italian Scientific Societies for Cardiovascular Prevention.

== Research ==
Mancia’s research spans the epidemiology, pathophysiology, diagnosis, and treatment of hypertension, as well as heart failure, coronary artery disease, and cardiovascular prevention. His has worked in areas such as ambulatory blood pressure monitoring, neural control of the circulation, large artery mechanics, hemodynamics of cardiovascular drugs, therapy adherence and inertia, and large-scale clinical trials.

Early in his career, he conducted studies on hemodynamic changes during sleep and stressful behaviors. Using intra-arterial blood pressure measurement and following a population sample for more than 30 years, he contributed to expanding knowledge on out-of-office blood pressure monitoring. During the COVID-19 pandemic, Mancia co-authored a study demonstrating that angiotensin-converting enzyme inhibitors and angiotensin receptor blockers were not associated with an increased risk of COVID-19 infection or severity, providing critical evidence to support continued use of these therapies in patients with hypertension and cardiovascular disease.

=== Selected publications ===
- Mancia, Giuseppe; Ginnattasio, Cristina; Turrini, Davide; Grassi, Guido; Omboni, Stefano (1995). "Structural cardiovascular alterations and blood pressure variability in human hypertension". Journal of Hypertension. 13 (Supplement 1): S7–S14. doi:10.1097/00004872-199508001-00002. ISSN 0263-6352. PMID 8576791.
- Mancia, Giuseppe (2006). "Total cardiovascular risk: a new treatment concept". Journal of Hypertension. 24 (Suppl 2): S17–S24. doi:10.1097/01.hjh.0000220099.12154.c1. ISSN 0263-6352. PMID 16601556.
- MANCIA, G (2007). "ADVANCE in the Prevention of Cardiovascular Disease in Diabetic Patients". American Journal of Hypertension. 20 (7): S1–S2. doi:10.1016/j.amjhyper.2007.04.015. ISSN 0895-7061.
- Mancia, Giuseppe (2015-03-13). "Introduction to a Compendium on Hypertension". Circulation Research. 116 (6): 923–924. doi:10.1161/circresaha.115.305755. ISSN 0009-7330. PMID 25767280.
- Mancia, Giuseppe; Rosei, Enrico Agabiti; Ambrosioni, Ettore; Avino, Francesco; Carolei, Antonio; Daccò, Maurizio; Di Giacomo, Giovanni; Ferri, Claudio; Grazioli, Irene; Melzi, Gabriella; Nappi, Giuseppe; Pinessi, Lorenzo; Sandrini, Giorgio; Trimarco, Bruno; Zanchin, Giorgio (February 2011). "Hypertension and migraine comorbidity: prevalence and risk of cerebrovascular events: evidence from a large, multicenter, cross-sectional survey in Italy (MIRACLES study)". Journal of Hypertension. 29 (2): 309–318. doi:10.1097/hjh.0b013e3283410404. hdl:11380/853701. ISSN 0263-6352. PMID 21119534.
- Bilo, G; Caldara, G; Styczkiewicz, K; Revera, M; Lombardi, C; Giglio, A; Parati, S; Valentini, M; Mancia, G; Parati, G (2007). "Counteracting the Cardiovascular Effects of Hypobaric Hypoxia at Altitude: Role of Selective and Non-Selective Beta-Blockade". High Blood Pressure & Cardiovascular Prevention. 14 (3): 145–196. doi:10.2165/00151642-200714030-00165. ISSN 1120-9879.
