= Initiative for Science in Europe =

Independent platform of European learned societies and scientific organisations

- Formation: 2017
- Headquarters: Strasbourg, France
- President: Martin Andler
- Website: www.initiative-se.eu

The Initiative for Science in Europe (ISE) is an independent platform of European learned societies and scientific organisations. It provides a common forum for the scientific communities to advocate independent scientific advice in European policy making and to stimulate the involvement of European scientists in the design and implementation of European science policy. Founded as informal organisation back in 2004, it was later registered as a not-for-profit organisation in Strasbourg since October 2017.

== History ==
General dissatisfaction with science policy and funding instruments at European level and the lack of involvement of scientists in policy making has led European learned societies in the early 2000s to seek ways to advocate a stronger role for science in Europe. Initial focus was on the visionary idea of a European funding instrument to foster and fund frontier research of the highest quality in all scientific disciplines.

Activities were first coordinated by the European Life Science Forum, but the initiative was rapidly joined by other disciplines and organisations. As a consequence, the Initiative for Science in Europe was formally launched on 25 October 2004 in Paris, France. The organisation was eventually registered as a not-for-profit organisation in Strasbourg on 12 October 2017.

The first President of ISE was Jose Mariano Gago, former Portuguese Minister of Science, Technology and Higher Education and one of the initiators of concept of European Research Area (ERA), followed by Julio Celis, Federico Mayor Zaragoza former Director General of UNESCO, and Maria Leptin (former director of EMBO and President of the European Research Council). The current President of ISE is Prof. Martin Andler.
