= Frank Gannon =

Irish molecular biologist

Frank (Bernard Francis Xavier) Gannon (born 1947, Ireland) is a molecular biologist, and was the seventh Director of QIMR Berghofer Medical Research Institute in Brisbane, Australia (2011 – 2020). He has held high-profile appointments in scientific management and research in Ireland, England, the United States, France, Germany and Australia.

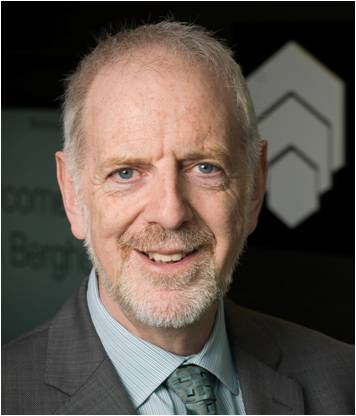
Frank Gannon, director, QIMR Berghofer

== Career ==
=== Education ===
In 1970, Gannon completed a Bachelor of Science with Honours at the National University of Ireland Galway (then known as University College Galway). He then moved to the University of Leicester, where he obtained his PhD in 1973.

=== Early career ===
In 1973, Gannon joined the laboratory of Jack Gorski at the University of Wisconsin-Madison as a post-doctoral researcher. There, he worked on the oestrogen receptor and investigated the mechanisms that resulted in the receptor being localised in the nucleus. This work led to a significant paper being published in the Annual Review of Physiology.

In 1975, Gannon moved to the University of Strasbourg, France to take up a post-doctoral fellowship in the laboratory of Professor Pierre Chambon. In 1977, while still in this role, Gannon was appointed Chargé de Recherche of the French National Institute of Health and Medical Research (INSERM). During this time he was involved in a number of DNA cloning experiments which culminated in the isolation of the chicken ovalbumin gene.

In 1981 Gannon returned to University College Galway (UCG) in Ireland and took up a position in the Department of Microbiology.

== EMBO and EMBL ==
From 1994 to 2007, Gannon was the Executive Director (Secretary at the time) of the European Molecular Biology Organisation (EMBO) and Senior Scientist at the European Molecular Biology Laboratory (EMBL), based in Germany.

During this time, Gannon became the founding editor of the journal EMBO Reports and contributed a monthly editorial on a range of topics, including the impact of research on society. During his time at EMBO, Gannon also showed a commitment to female researchers by analysing fellowship application data to conduct an objective assessment of the potential causes for the lower success rate of female applicants for postdoctoral fellowships.

During this period, Gannon also maintained an active research group that focussed on the manner in which the oestrogen receptor (ER) controlled gene expression. Outstanding from a series of high-impact studies was the demonstration of the cyclical nature of the binding of the ER to its DNA response element that resulted in the sequential recruitment of chromatin-modifying enzymes and ultimately the RNA polymerase, prior to that sequence of events being reversed. Pursuing this research approach, Gannon's team subsequently showed that DNA methylation (previously thought to be an indelible mark) was also subject to dynamic and cyclical change.

=== Scientific Foundation Ireland ===
In 2007, after 13 years at the helm of EMBO, Gannon accepted the position of Director General of Science Foundation Ireland (SFI). SFI had been established by the Irish government 10 years earlier to recruit and retain high-quality researchers based on their excellence, with the expectation that this would provide an extra offering and possibilities for multi-national and local companies that had activities particularly in the areas of pharmaceuticals, information technology and energy.

=== QIMR Berghofer Medical Research Institute ===
Soon after Gannon moved to Dublin for the SFI position, Ireland faced a major economic setback that ultimately required a bailout from the EU and the International Monetary Fund. Faced with the uncertainty of future funding for SFI, Gannon decided to move again, and in 2010, he accepted the position of Director and CEO of the Queensland Institute of Medical Research (QIMR) in Brisbane, Australia. Gannon started at QIMR in January 2011. The name of the institute was changed to QIMR Berghofer Medical Research Institute (QIMR Berghofer), following Gannon's successful attraction of a major donation from Clive Berghofer – a philanthropist and property developer from Toowoomba.

At QIMR Berghofer, Gannon restructured the Institute so that it had four programs (Cancer, Infectious Diseases, Mental Health, and Chronic Disorders) and four departments (Genetics and Computational Biology, Immunology, Cell and Molecular Biology, and Population Health. Gannon made a specific effort to extend translation of the institute's research, through industry, to the clinic. He also placed emphasis on developing better contacts with Asia, which resulted in increased research and commercial collaborations, particularly with China and India. He also reactivated his research group focusing on enzymes involved in epigenetic modifications. In 2019, Gannon announced he was retiring after nine years at the helm of the Institute.

=== Other appointments ===
- Vice-President of the European Heads of Research Council
- Advisor to the EU Commissioner for Research and Innovation
- Co-founded of the European Life Sciences Forum and the Initiative for Science in Europe, which played significant roles in the establishment of the European Research Council
- Scientific advisory board member, International Institute for Molecular and Cell Biology (Warsaw, Poland)
- Elected member of the Royal Irish Academy
- Elected member of Academia Europae
- Elected member of the European Academy of Cancer Sciences
- Elected member of the Queensland Arts and Sciences Academy
- Elected member of the Mexican National Academy of Medicine
- Elected board member of the Australian Academy of Health and Medical Research
- Founder of Bimini Ltd
- Founder of Elara Pharmaceuticals
- Elected Fellow of the Australian Academy of Health and Medical Sciences

== Awards and honours ==
- 1999: Honorary doctorate from the Josef Attila University, Szeged, Hungary
- 2008: Honorary doctorate from Queens University, Belfast, Northern Ireland
- 2008: Honorary doctorate from The University of Queensland, Australia
