= Derek M. Yellon =

South African-British researcher

Derek Miles Yellon
- Born: South Africa
- Education: University of Cape Town; University of Bath (PhD, 1978)
- Known for: Founding and directing the Hatter Cardiovascular Institute
- Medical career
- Sub-specialties: Cardiology

Derek Miles Yellon is a South African-British researcher in the biomedical sciences, known for his work in cardiovascular medicine. He is a professor of molecular and cellular cardiology at University College London, and is director of the Hatter Cardiovascular Institute at University College London Hospitals and Medical School.

== Education and career ==
Yellon was born in South Africa, to a British father and South African mother. He had his early education at the University of Cape Town. He went on to a PhD in cardiovascular pharmacology from the University of Bath, which he received in 1978. His thesis title was Tolbutamide and the Ischaemic Heart. In 1994, the University of Bath awarded him a DSc degree.

After his PhD, Yellon worked for several years in St. Thomas' Hospital in London. He then worked as medical director for Lorex Pharmaceuticals, a small pharmaceutical company, from 1987 until it was acquired by a larger company in 1988.

After leaving his job at the pharmaceutical company, Yellon was approached by University College London and the London Hospital about creating a department for cardiology research. He established the Hatter Cardiovascular Institute, a research centre focused on causes and treatment of cardiovascular disease, between 1990 and 1991 at University College London. He was promoted to the title of professor by the same university in 1993.

Yellon was instrumental in the founding of the Hatter Institute for Cardiovascular Research in Africa (independent of the London Hatter Institute) at the medical school of the University of Cape Town in 1996. He continues to serve on its board. In association with this development Yellon helped begin "At the Limits", a series of medical educational programmes.

== Awards and honors ==
- Yellon was appointed as a fellow of the International Society for Heart Research in 2001.
- The University of Cape Town awarded Yellon an honorary doctorate of science in 2013.
