= Herbert Eisner =

British writer

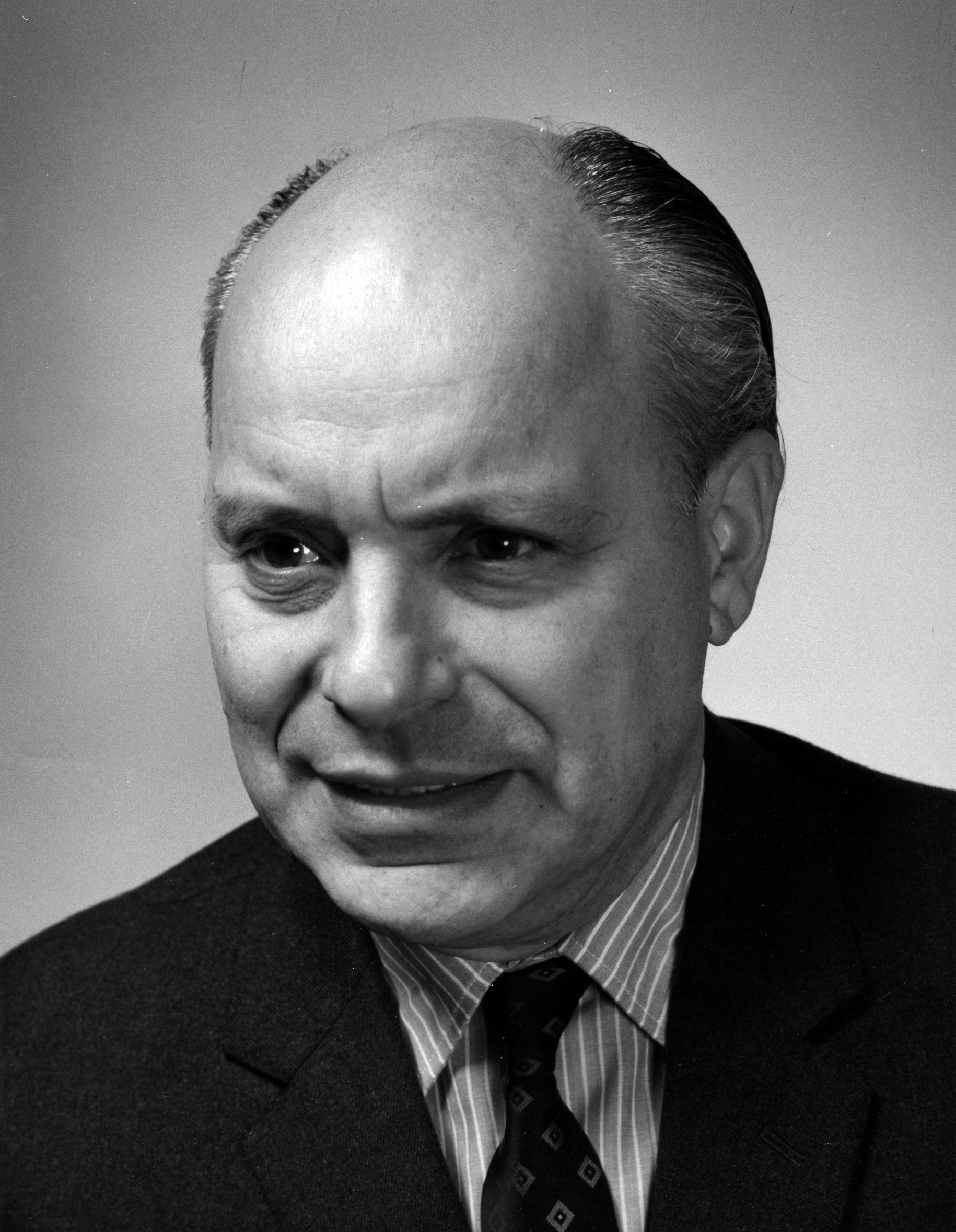
- Born: Herbert Sigmund Eisner; 23 June 1921; Berlin, Weimar Republic
- Died: 28 June 2011 (aged 90); Harrogate, North Yorkshire, England
- Education: University of Nottingham
- Occupation: British Army soldier
- Children: David Eisner

Herbert Sigmund Eisner (23 June 1921 – 28 June 2011) was a British-German scientist whose work led to high-expansion fire fighting foam. He was also a playwright.

== Early life ==
He was born in Berlin.

His paternal grandfather knew the composer Richard Strauss, his maternal grandfather founded Germany's first department store, the Grand Bazaar, in Frankfurt. His mother was a Wagnerian singer who knew the playwright Bertolt Brecht. The family lived near the Tiergarten (lit. Animal Garden) in central Berlin, and as a result often saw Joseph Goebbels walking to work. His aunt was Lotte H. Eisner, a German-French film critic, notably of German Expressionism, and a friend Leni Riefenstahl, the film director.

In 1936 he was sent to Buxton College, a boys' grammar school in Derbyshire. His parents left Berlin in 1939 and moved to London. When war broke out he was sent to the Isle of Man, with future members of the Amadeus Quartet. He joined the British Army, taking the surname Evans, and was sent to Kerala where he repaired tanks, becoming a Staff Sergeant.

He later read physics at University College, Nottingham (the University of Nottingham).

== Career ==
He worked for most of his life at the Safety in Mines Research Establishment (SMRE) in north-west Derbyshire until 1981.

=== Fire-fighting foam ===
In 1956 he carried out work on high-expansion foam to extinguish fires, which would lead directly to foam manufactured as a fire extinguishing agent. In 1964 Walter Kidde & Company (now called Kidde) bought the patents for high expansion foam.

=== Author ===
In the 1960s he wrote radio plays for BBC Radio 4 (the Home Service) and, in 1974 published a children's book, The Monster Plant

== Personal life ==
In 1948 he married Gisela Spanglet, who came to Britain aged 13 with the Kindertransport, having met her at university in Nottingham. In 1951 they moved to Buxton. They had two daughters and two sons. One of the sons is a violinist with the London Philharmonic Orchestra, who married Jessica Duchen, a novelist and classical music journalist and writer, in 1989. One of his daughters became a GP, another Harriet, a regional officer for the UK’s biggest trade union, Unite.Another son, David Eisner, became a professor of physiology at the University of Manchester and married another physiologist, Susan Wray. Herbert Eisner died in Harrogate in 2011.
