= Cathrin Brisken =

German and Swiss cancer researcher

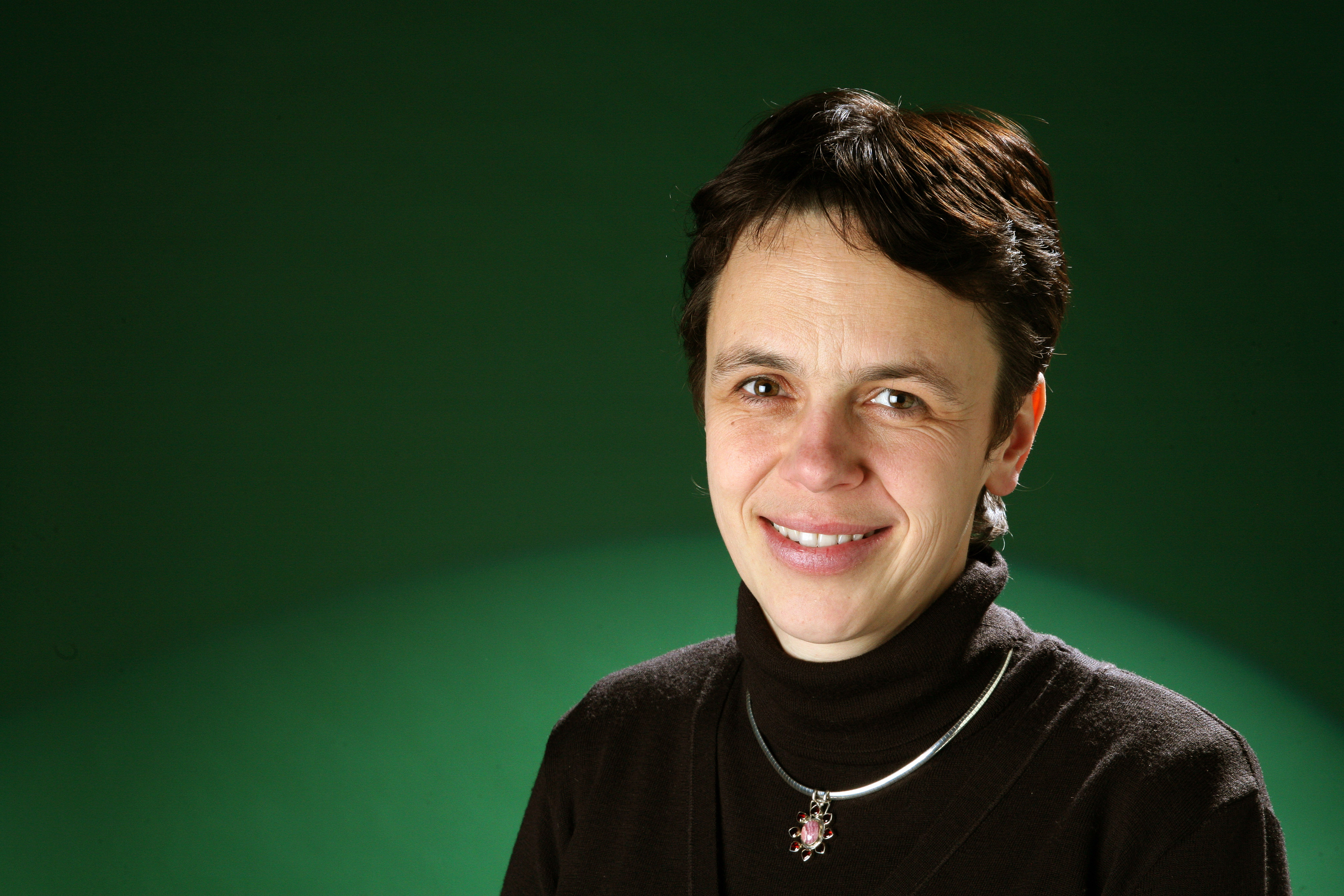
- Cathrin Brisken in 2006
- Born: 1967 (age 58–59)
- Title: Associate Professor
- Spouse: Gian-Paolo Dotto
- Children: 3

Academic background
- Education: Medicine
- Alma mater: University of Göttingen

Academic work
- Discipline: Oncology
- Institutions: École Polytechnique Fédérale de Lausanne (EPFL)
- Main interests: Breast Cancer, Hormones
- Website: https://www.epfl.ch/labs/brisken-lab/

Cathrin Brisken (born in 1967 in Osnabrück, Germany) is a German and Swiss medical doctor, researcher, and professor at the École Polytechnique Fédérale de Lausanne (EPFL). Her research focuses on the mechanisms of hormonal control in breast cancer development.

== Career ==
Brisken obtained a doctoral degree in medicine in 1992 and a PhD in biophysics in 1993 from the University of Göttingen. She then pursued postdoctoral work in the laboratory of Robert Weinberg at the Whitehead Institute for Biomedical Research, MIT. In 2001, she was named assistant professor at the Massachusetts General Hospital Cancer Center. In 2002, she moved to Switzerland to work as an associate scientist at the Swiss Institute for Experimental Cancer Research in Lausanne. In 2005, she was named tenure-track assistant professor at EPFL, where she was promoted to associate professor in 2012. In January 2020, she was appointed professor at the Institute for Cancer Research in London, where she acts part time and leads the Laboratory of Endocrine Control Mechanisms and the Laboratory of In vivo Modelling.

In 2015, she co-founded the International Cancer Prevention Institute together with Gian-Paolo Dotto.

== Research ==
During her postdoctoral studies in Robert Weinberg's laboratory, Brisken combined in vivo tissue reconstitution approaches with mouse genetics, thereby contributing to the understanding that the female sex hormones, estrogens, progesterone, and prolactin act at sequential stages of mammary gland development, with the mammary epithelium as primary target. She also showed that steroid hormones act by paracrine mechanisms and identified specific secreted Wnt factors as essential mediators of progesterone.

Brisken established her own group at EPFL in 2005. Research in her laboratory focuses on the cellular and molecular bases of estrogen, progesterone, and androgen receptor signaling in the breast and the respective roles of these hormones and hormonally active compounds in breast carcinogenesis. Brisken's laboratory aims to understand how recurrent exposures to endogenous and exogenous hormones contribute to breast cancer development in order to better prevent and treat the disease.

Brisken's laboratory has proposed novel genetic in vivo approaches and develops ex vivo and xenograft models using patient samples to study hormone action in human tissues in normal settings and during disease progression. In 2011, it provided evidence that bisphenol A, a common component of consumer products, has persistent effects on mammary gland development of female embryos whose mothers are exposed to environmentally-relevant doses, pointing to epigenetic events influencing life time breast cancer risk during a perinatal window.

== Distinctions ==
Brisken is a member of the Biological Protocol Working Group of the International Breast Cancer Study Group and of the Pezcoller Symposia Scientific Standing Committee. She served as the Dean of the EPFL Doctoral School from 2012 to 2014, as a member of the Hinterzartener Kreis for cancer research, of the oncology think-tank associated with the German Science Foundation, and of various Swiss, European, and AACR committees. She was a member of the Women in Cancer Research Council of the American Association for Cancer Research from 2016 to 2020.

== Personal life ==
Brisken is married to fellow cancer researcher Gian-Paolo Dotto and they have three children. She speaks eight languages including English.
