= Rockefeller University =

Research university in New York City

The Rockefeller University
- Former names: The Rockefeller Institute for Medical Research (1901–1958); The Rockefeller Institute (1958–1965)
- Motto: Scientia pro bono humani generis
- Motto in English: Science for the benefit of humanity
- Type: Private graduate-only university
- Established: 1901; 125 years ago
- Founder: John D. Rockefeller
- Accreditation: NECHE
- Academic affiliations: URA
- Endowment: $2.61 billion (2025)
- President: Richard P. Lifton
- Academic staff: 79
- Postgraduates: 232
- Location: Upper East Side, Manhattan, New York City, United States; 40°45′45″N 73°57′20″W
- Campus: Urban, 16 acres
- Website: rockefeller.edu

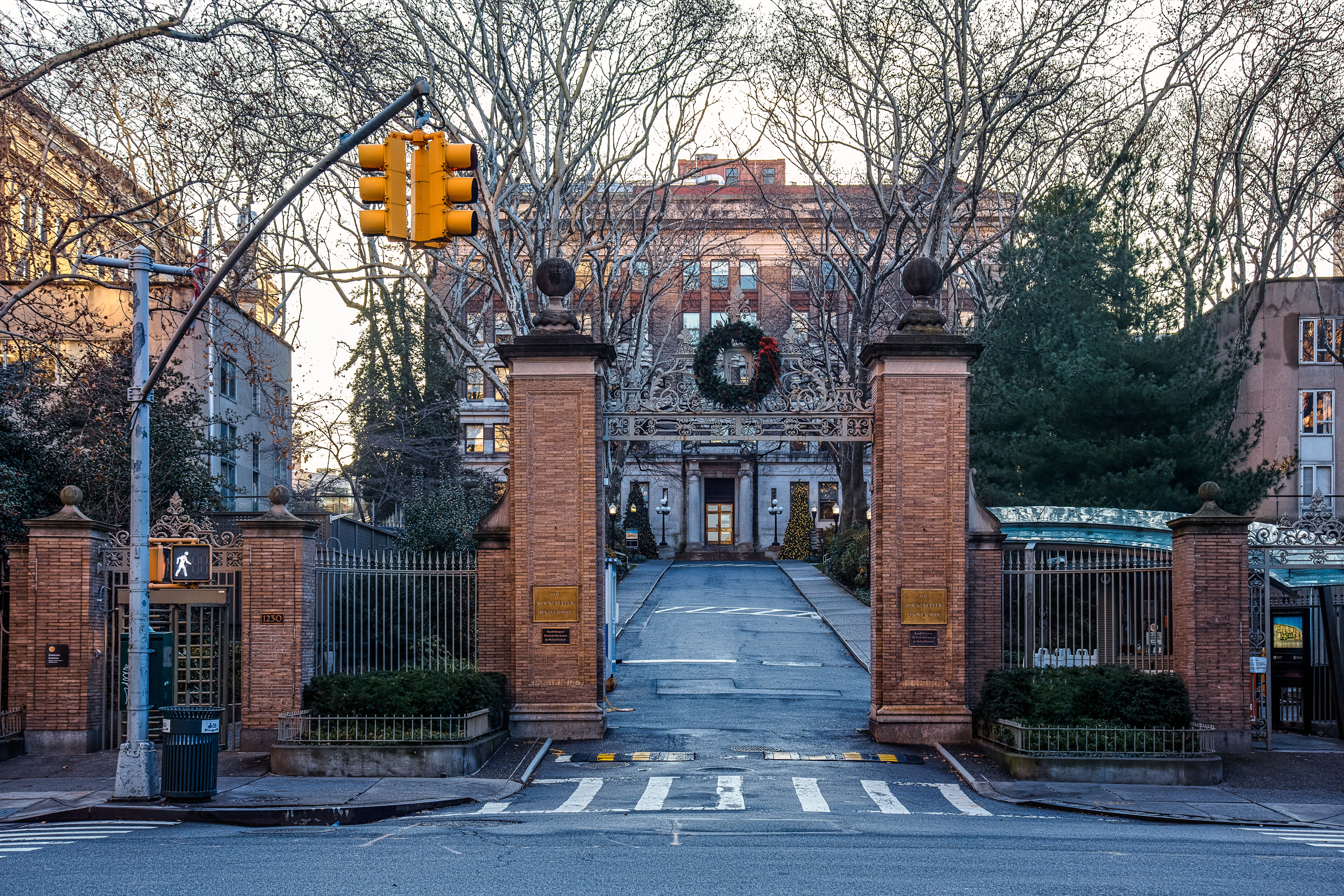
York Avenue gates

The Rockefeller University is a private biomedical research and graduate-only university in New York City, United States. It focuses primarily on the biological and medical sciences and provides doctoral and postdoctoral education. It is classified as a "Special Focus – Research Institution". Rockefeller is the oldest biomedical research institute in the United States.

The university is located on the Upper East Side of Manhattan, between 63rd and 68th streets on York Avenue. Richard P. Lifton became the university's eleventh president on September 1, 2016. The Rockefeller University Press publishes the Journal of Experimental Medicine, the Journal of Cell Biology, and The Journal of General Physiology.

In 2018, the faculty included 82 tenured and tenure-track members, including 37 members of the National Academy of Sciences, 17 members of the National Academy of Medicine, 7 Lasker Award recipients, and 5 Nobel laureates. As of March 2022, a total of 26 Nobel laureates have been affiliated with Rockefeller University.

== History ==
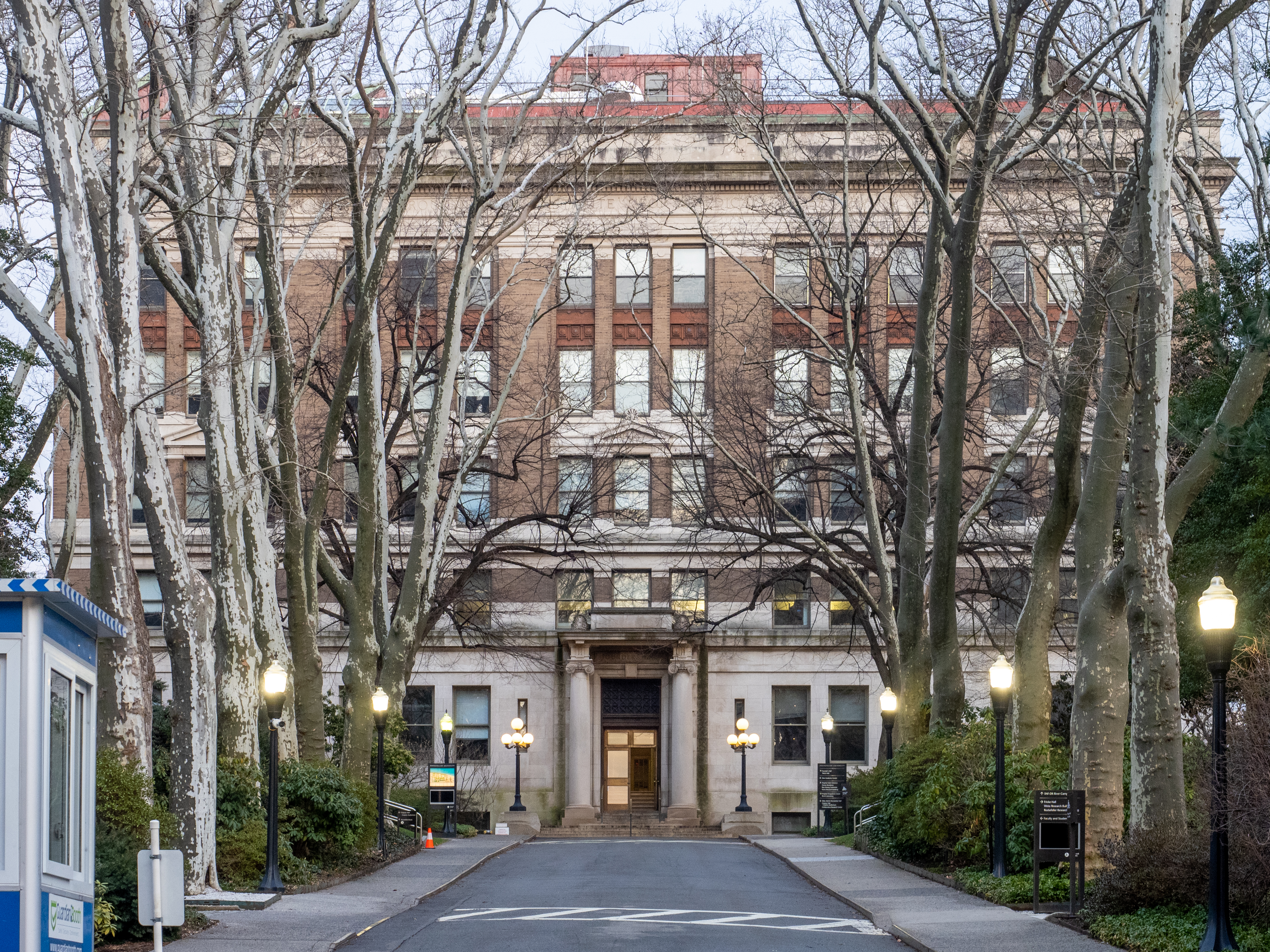
Founder's Hall (2022)

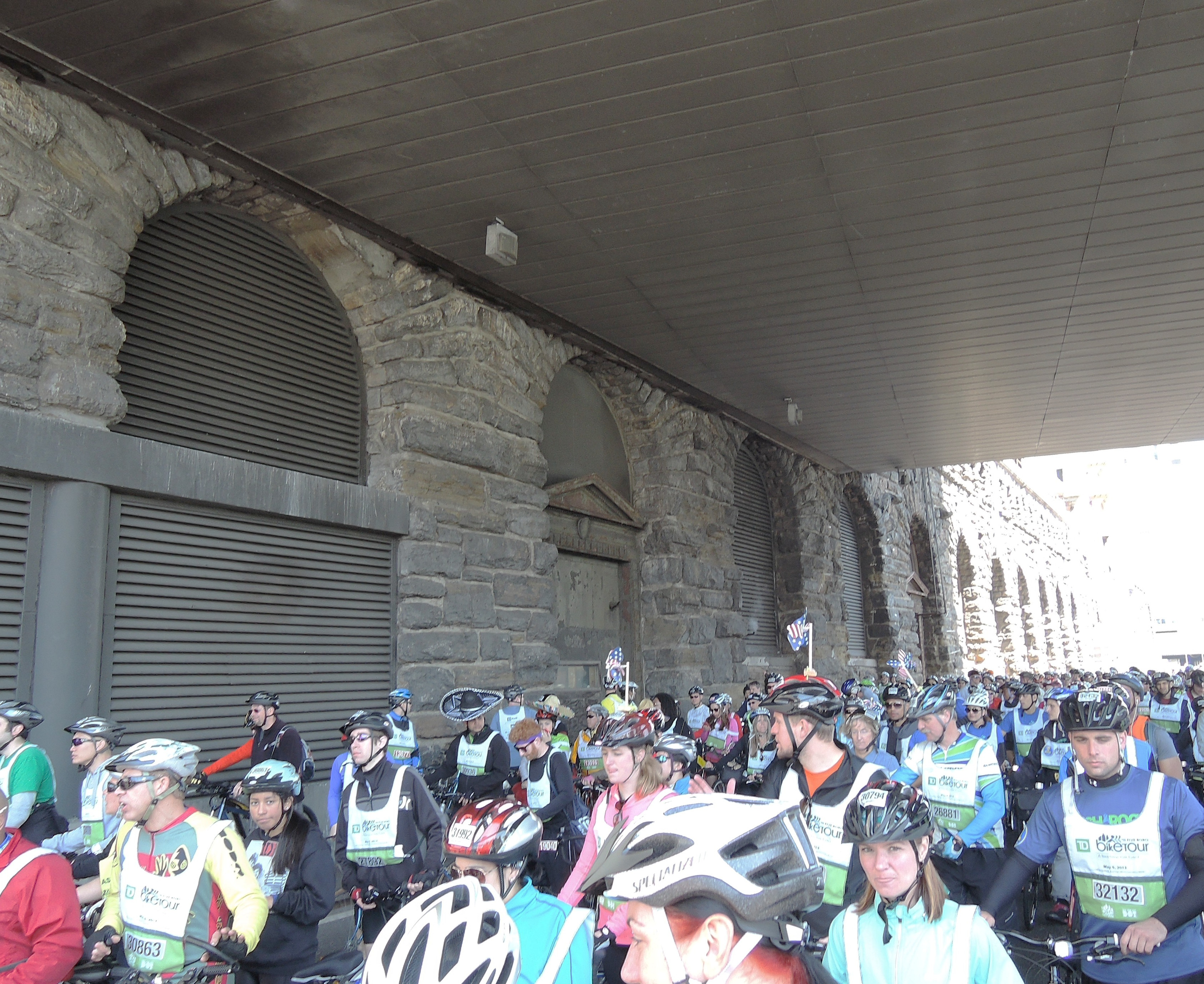
The FDR Drive runs under the campus.

The Rockefeller University was founded in June 1901 as The Rockefeller Institute for Medical Research—often called simply The Rockefeller Institute—by John D. Rockefeller, who had founded the University of Chicago in 1889, upon advice by his adviser Frederick T. Gates and action taken in March 1901 by his son, John D. Rockefeller Jr. Greatly elevating the prestige of American science and medicine, it was America's first biomedical institute, like France's Pasteur Institute (1888) and Germany's Robert Koch Institute (1891). The Rockefeller Foundation, a philanthropic organization founded in 1913, is a separate entity but had close connections mediated by prominent figures holding dual positions.

The first director of laboratories was Simon Flexner, who supervised the development of research capacity at the institute, whose staff made major discoveries in basic research and medicine. While a student at Johns Hopkins University, Flexner had studied under the institute's first scientific director, William H. Welch, first dean of Hopkins' medical school and known as the dean of American medicine. Flexner retired in 1935 and was succeeded by Herbert Gasser. He was succeeded in 1953 by Detlev Bronk, who broadened The Rockefeller Institute into a university that began awarding the PhD degree in 1954. In 1965 The Rockefeller Institute's name was changed to The Rockefeller University.

For its first six decades, the institute focused on basic research to develop basic science, on applied research as biomedical engineering, and, since 1910—when The Rockefeller Hospital opened on its campus as America's first facility for clinical research—on clinical science. The Rockefeller Hospital's first director Rufus Cole retired in 1937 and was succeeded by Thomas Milton Rivers. As director of The Rockefeller Institute's virology laboratory, he established virology as an independent field apart from bacteriology.

In the 1940s, it hosted a "scientific team that overturned medical dogma" and "became the first to demonstrate that genes were made of DNA."

=== Rockefeller family ===
Rockefeller Sr visited the university just once, at the urging of Rockefeller Jr, who was enthusiastic about the institute. Rockefeller Jr and his youngest son David visited more often. At 24 years old, David Rockefeller joined the board of trustees in 1940 and was its chairman from 1950 to 1975. He went on to chair the board's executive committee from 1975 to 1995, became honorary chairman and life trustee. He remained active with the university as a philanthropist until his death at 102 years old in 2017.

=== Institutional changes ===
In 1965, the Rockefeller Institute Hospital was renamed Rockefeller University Hospital.

=== Archives ===
The Rockefeller Archive Center was established in 1974 as part of the university and has been an independent foundation since 2008. Personal and professional papers from faculty of the Rockefeller University are held at the Archive Center in Sleepy Hollow, New York.

== Organization and administration ==
=== Governance ===
- More than 71 heads of laboratories
- 200 research and clinical scientists
- 210 postdoctoral investigators
- 1,050 clinicians, technicians, administrative and support staff

To foster an interdisciplinary atmosphere among its laboratories, faculty members are grouped into one or more of ten interconnecting research areas:

- biochemistry, biophysics, chemical biology, and structural biology
- cancer biology
- cell biology
- genetics and genomics
- immunology, virology, and microbiology
- mechanisms of human disease
- neurosciences and behavior
- organismal biology and evolution
- physical, mathematical, and computational biology
- stem cells, development, regeneration, and aging

== Academics ==
Academic rankings

Global
- ARWU: 43
- U.S. News & World Report: 62

=== Graduate degree programs ===
Rockefeller University admitted its first graduate students in 1955. Today, about 255 graduate students are enrolled in the program, which offers doctoral degrees in the biomedical sciences, chemistry, and biophysics. The university's organization on the basis of laboratories rather than a hierarchical departmental structure extends to the graduate program, where laboratory research is the primary focus and students can meet degree requirements by participating in any combination of courses. In partnership with neighboring Memorial Sloan Kettering Cancer Center and Weill Cornell Medicine, Rockefeller participates in the Tri-Institutional MD–PhD Program as well as a Tri-Institutional chemical biology Ph.D. program.

=== Contemporary research ===
Rockefeller has ranked in the CWTS Leiden Ranking, an international ranking of research impact.

Rockefeller faculty have made contributions to breakthroughs in biomedical sciences. Michael W. Young was one of several scientists who located genes that regulate the sleep–wake cycle in 1984. In 1994, Jeffrey M. Friedman's laboratory discovered leptin, a gene that influences appetite and weight. Charles David Allis helped identify the first enzyme that modifies histones in 1996, providing early evidence that the DNA packaging material plays a crucial role in gene regulation. In 1998, Roderick MacKinnon's laboratory elucidated the structure and mechanism of a potassium channel, explaining how electrical signals are conveyed across cell membranes. Titia de Lange was part of a team that found how telomeres protect chromosome ends, shedding light on the role of genome instability in cancer in 1999. Robert B. Darnell led research that defined the molecular basis of fragile X syndrome, the second leading cause of intellectual disability, in 2001. Vincent A. Fischetti was part of a group that developed a powerful agent that can target and wipe out anthrax bacteria in 2002. Charles M. Rice helped produce an infectious form of the hepatitis C virus in laboratory cultures of human cells in 2005, leading directly to three new classes of hepatitis C drugs. Elaine Fuchs helped define the stem cells that can initiate squamous cell carcinoma in 2011, and also characterized the signaling pathways that drive malignancy. In 2013, Leslie B. Vosshall's laboratory identified a gene in mosquitoes that is responsible for their attraction to humans and their sensitivity to the insect repellent DEET. Ali Brivanlou's laboratory developed a method to grow embryos outside the uterus for up to 13 days in 2016, allowing scientists to study the earliest events of human development.

In 2020, many Rockefeller scientists shifted the focus of their research in response to the COVID-19 pandemic. Michel C. Nussenzweig pioneered a method to isolate and clone antibodies from people who successfully recovered from COVID-19 to design a treatment that prevents people from developing severe disease. Jean-Laurent Casanova identified genetic mutations that are responsible for a subset of unexpectedly severe cases of COVID-19.

== Campus and student life ==
Founder's Hall was the first building on Rockefeller's campus, built between 1903 and 1906. It housed the nation's first major biomedical research laboratory and was declared a National Historic Landmark in 1974. Caspary Auditorium, a 40-foot-high, 90-foot round geodesic dome, was built in 1957 and hosts a variety of concert series and lectures. The completion of the Stavros Niarchos Foundation–David Rockefeller River Campus in 2019, built along the East River over FDR Drive, added two acres to Rockefeller's footprint. Rockefeller's campus houses a childcare center for researchers and other university employees.

Graduate students are offered subsidized housing on campus and receive an annual stipend. Student groups include People at Rockefeller Identifying as Sexual/Gender Minorities (PRISM), Women in Science at Rockefeller (WISeR), and the Science and Education Policy Association (SEPA). The student-run publication Natural Selections is produced monthly.

== Promotion of women in science and outreach activities ==
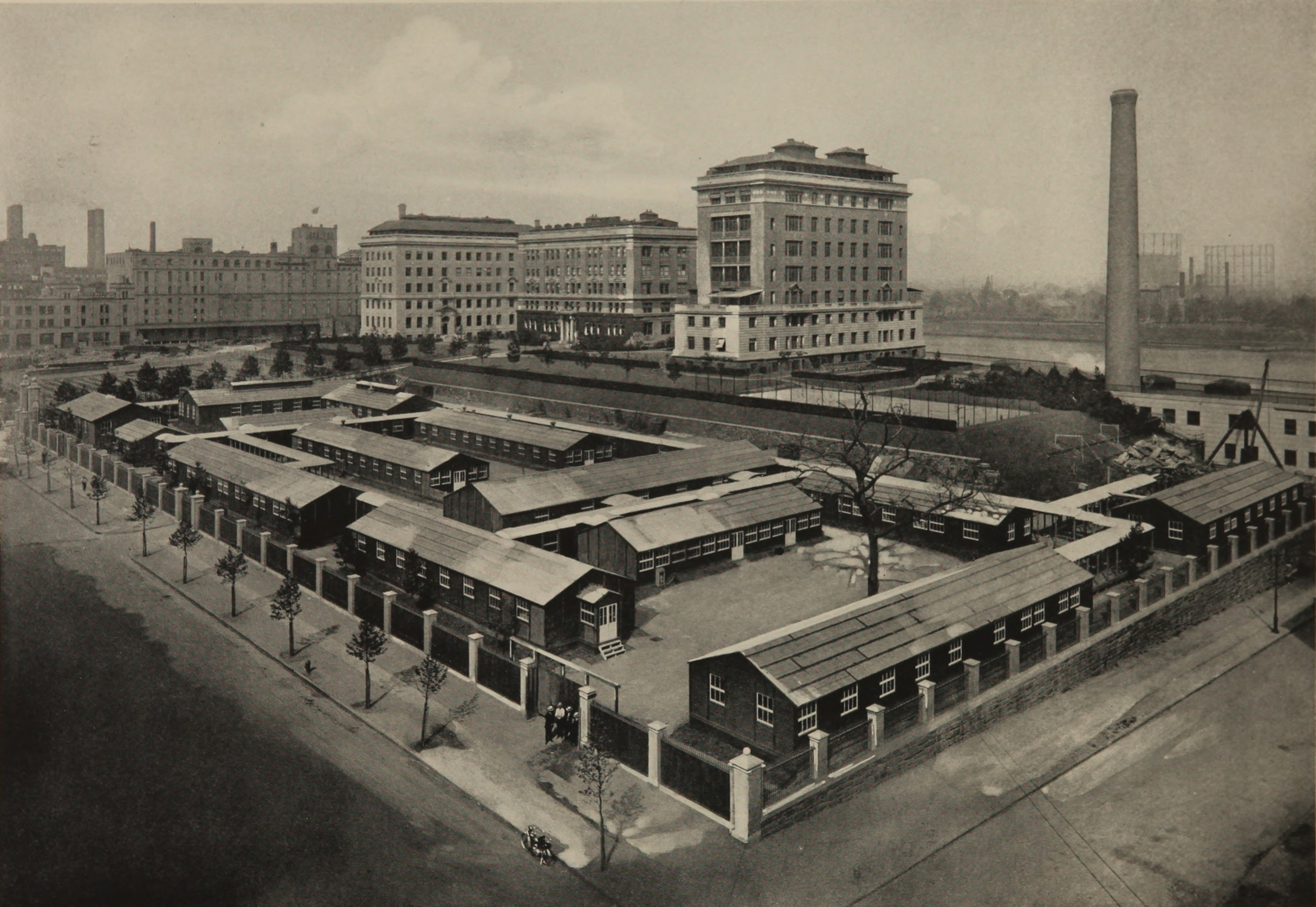
War Demonstration Hospital, 1917

The Rockefeller University established a Women in Science initiative in 1998 to address the underrepresentation of women in the field. It is founded mainly by female philanthropists. The program includes scholarships and an entrepreneurship found to help increase the low number of female researchers that commercialize their discoveries. In 2004 Rockefeller's professor Paul Greengard donated the full amount of his Nobel Prize to establish the Pearl Meister Greengard Prize given annually to a woman scientist in the field of biology.

Rockefeller also host diverse initiatives to promote science and culture: Parents & Science Initiative, The RockEDU Science Outreach for K-12 students and teachers that includes lab experience and professional development and The Lewis Thomas Prize for writing about science is given annually.

In addition, Rockefeller hosts the Peggy Rockefeller Concerts and in collaboration with Cornell University and Memorial Sloan Kettering Cancer Center it hosts the Tri-Institutional Noon concert Series.

In 2012, Rockefeller began participating in Open House New York's OHNY Weekend.

== Notable people ==
=== Nobel laureates ===
| Year | Nobel Laureate | Prize | Rockefeller Affiliation |
|---|---|---|---|
| 2020 | Charles M. Rice | Physiology or Medicine | Faculty when prize awarded |
| 2020 | Emmanuelle Charpentier | Chemistry | Postdoctoral fellow before prize awarded |
| 2017 | Michael W. Young | Physiology or Medicine | Faculty when prize awarded |
| 2016 | Yoshinori Ohsumi | Physiology or Medicine | Postdoctoral fellow before prize awarded |
| 2011 | Ralph Steinman | Physiology or Medicine | Faculty when prize awarded |
| 2011 | Bruce Beutler | Physiology or Medicine | Postdoctoral fellow before prize awarded |
| 2003 | Roderick MacKinnon | Chemistry | Faculty when prize awarded |
| 2001 | Paul Nurse | Physiology or Medicine | President and faculty after prize awarded |
| 2000 | Paul Greengard | Physiology or Medicine | Faculty when prize awarded |
| 1999 | Günter Blobel | Physiology or Medicine | Faculty when prize awarded |
| 1984 | R. Bruce Merrifield | Chemistry | Faculty when prize awarded |
| 1981 | Torsten Wiesel | Physiology or Medicine | President and faculty after prize awarded |
| 1975 | David Baltimore | Physiology or Medicine | Alumnus; President after prize awarded |
| 1974 | Albert Claude | Physiology or Medicine | Faculty before prize awarded |
| 1974 | Christian de Duve | Physiology or Medicine | Faculty when prize awarded |
| 1974 | George E. Palade | Physiology or Medicine | Faculty before prize awarded |
| 1972 | Stanford Moore | Chemistry | Faculty when prize awarded |
| 1972 | William H. Stein | Chemistry | Faculty when prize awarded |
| 1972 | Gerald M. Edelman | Physiology or Medicine | Alumnus; Faculty when prize awarded |
| 1967 | H. Keffer Hartline | Physiology or Medicine | Faculty when prize awarded |
| 1966 | Peyton Rous | Physiology or Medicine | Emeritus faculty when prize awarded |
| 1958 | Joshua Lederberg | Physiology or Medicine | President and then faculty after prize awarded |
| 1958 | Edward L. Tatum | Physiology or Medicine | Faculty when prize awarded |
| 1953 | Fritz Lipmann | Physiology or Medicine | Rockefeller fellow before and faculty after prize awarded |
| 1946 | John H. Northrop | Chemistry | Member when prize awarded |
| 1946 | Wendell M. Stanley | Chemistry | Member when prize awarded |
| 1944 | Herbert S. Gasser | Physiology or Medicine | Director when prize awarded |
| 1930 | Karl Landsteiner | Physiology or Medicine | Member when prize awarded |
| 1912 | Alexis Carrel | Physiology or Medicine | Member when prize awarded |

Award affiliations taken from "The Rockefeller University » Nobel Laureates".

=== Alumni ===
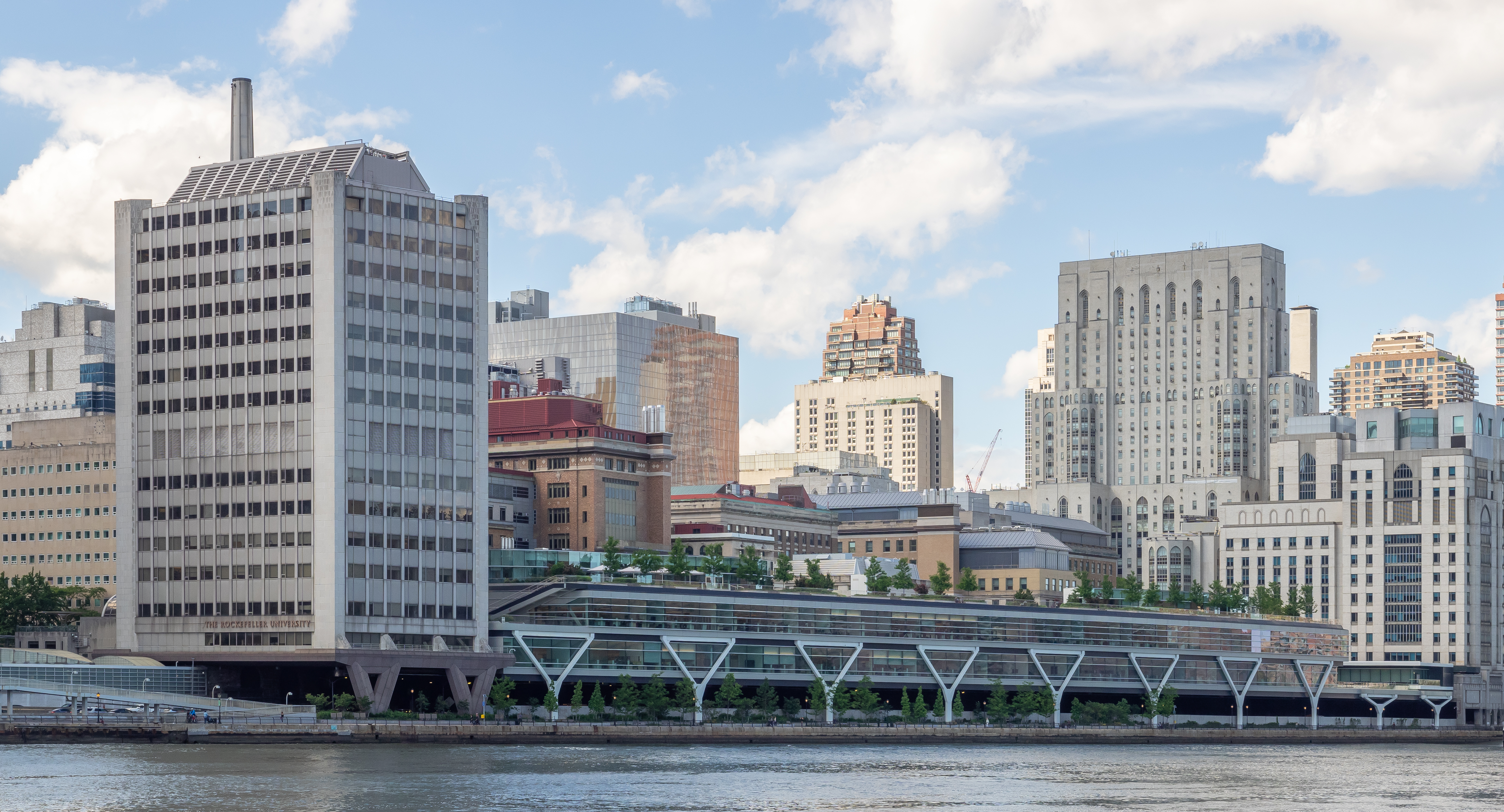
Rockefeller University as seen from Roosevelt Island (2019)

There are more than 1,262 alumni.

- David Albert, physicist and philosopher
- David Baltimore, recipient of Nobel Prize in Physiology & Medicine in 1975 for the discovery of reverse transcriptase. Has served as president of both the Rockefeller University and the California Institute of Technology.
- Michael Bratman, Durfee Professor of philosophy at Stanford University.
- Gerald Edelman, recipient of the 1972 Nobel Prize in Physiology or Medicine.
- Barbara Ehrenreich, social commentator and author of the 2001 book Nickel and Dimed: On (Not) Getting By In America.
- Alice F. Healy, psychologist, College Professor of Distinction at the University of Colorado Boulder
- Roy S. Herbst, oncologist, lung cancer researcher, and academic, Yale Cancer Center and Yale School of Medicine
- Bertil Hille, Professor of Physiology and Biophysics at the University of Washington, Lasker Award winner who specializes in cell signaling by ion channels, neurotransmitters and hormones.
- Mandë Holford, Professor in Chemistry at Hunter College with appointments at the American Museum of Natural History and Weill Cornell Medical College
- Jonathan Lear, the John U. Nef Distinguished Service Professor in the Committee on Social Thought and professor of philosophy at the University of Chicago, who specializes in Aristotle and psychoanalysis.
- Erich Jarvis, HHMI Investigator and head of the Neurogenetics of Language Laboratory at Rockefeller University.
- Seth Lloyd, physicist
- Harvey Lodish, professor of biology at the Massachusetts Institute of Technology and Founding Member of the Whitehead Institute for Biomedical Research
- Kiran Musunuru, professor of medicine at the Perelman School of Medicine at the University of Pennsylvania, co-founder of Verve Therapeutics, recipient of the Presidential Early Career Award for Scientists and Engineers
- Nina Papavasiliou, Helmholtz Professor in the Division of Immune Diversity at the German Cancer Research Center
- Manuel Elkin Patarroyo, Colombian pathologist who made the world's first attempt of synthetic vaccine for malaria. Recipient of Prince of Asturias Award in 1994.
- Vanessa Ruta, Head of the Laboratory of Neurophysiology and Behavior at Rockefeller University.
- Robert Sapolsky, Stanford professor, MacArthur "Genius" Grant recipient, and writer of numerous books on stress and natural history.
- Amos Smith, Rhodes-Thompson professor of chemistry at the University of Pennsylvania
- Leslie B. Vosshall, HHMI Investigator and the Robin Chemers Neustein Professor of Neurogenetics and Behavior at The Rockefeller University.
- Richard Wolfenden, professor of chemistry, biochemistry and biophysics at the University of North Carolina at Chapel Hill
- Gian-Paolo Dotto, professor and researcher, cancer domain.
- Martin Yarmush, Paul and Mary Monroe Chair and Distinguished Professor of Biomedical Engineering at Rutgers University and founding director of the Center for Engineering in Medicine at the Massachusetts General Hospital, Member of US National Academy of Engineering and National Academy of Inventors

=== Individual affiliates ===
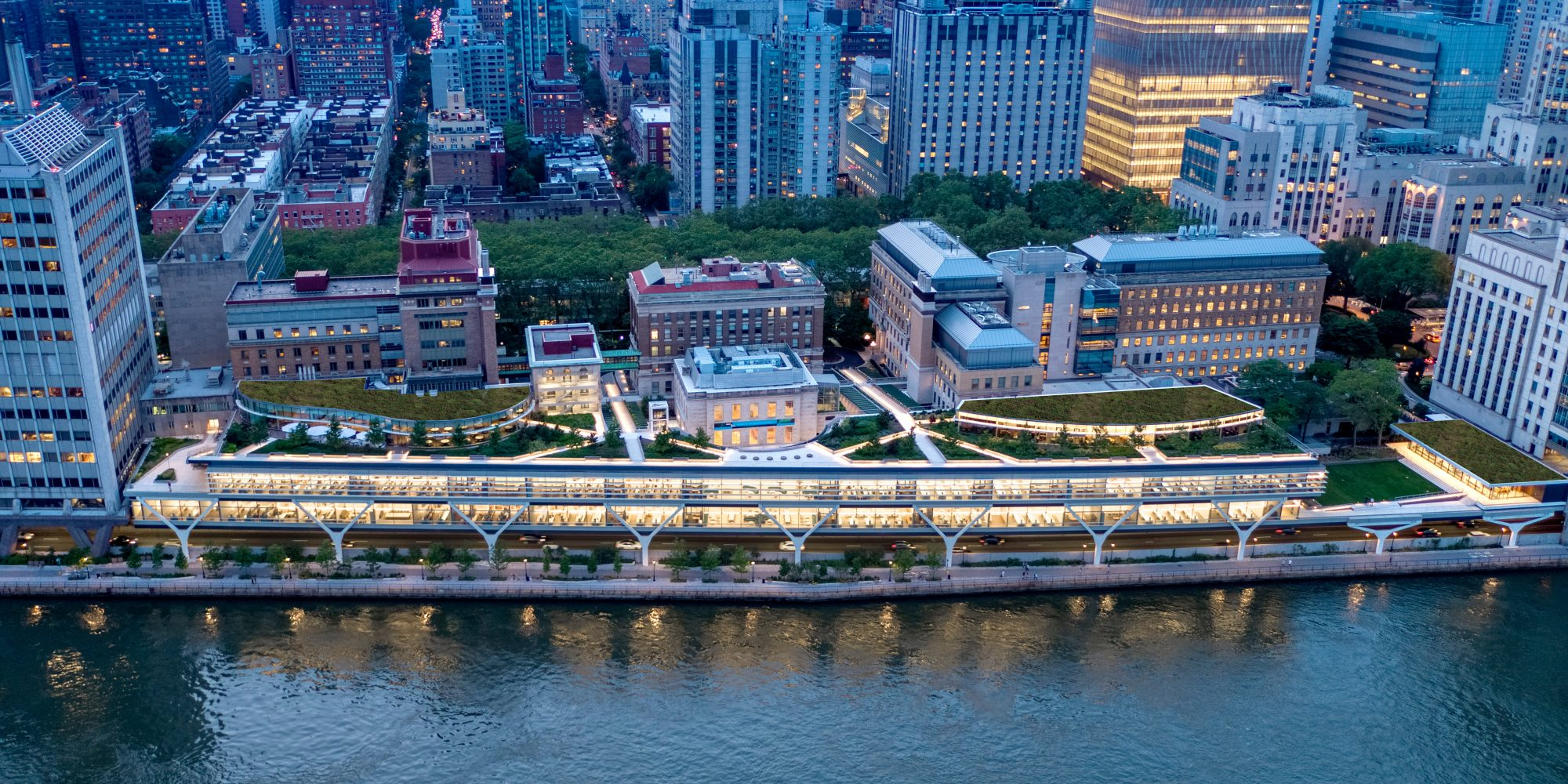
Rockefeller University campus on the FDR Drive, New York, NY, 2021

Notable figures to emerge from the institution include Alexis Carrel, Peyton Rous, Hideyo Noguchi, Thomas Milton Rivers, Richard Shope, Thomas Francis Jr, Oswald T. Avery, Frederick Griffith, Colin MacLeod, Maclyn McCarty, Rebecca Lancefield, Wendell Meredith Stanley, René Dubos, Ashton Carter, and Cornelius P. Rhoads. Others attained eminence before being drawn to the university. Joshua Lederberg, who won the Nobel Prize in Physiology or Medicine in 1958, served as president of the university from 1978 to 1990. Paul Nurse, who won the Nobel Prize in Physiology or Medicine in 2001, was president from 2003 to 2010. (Before Nurse's tenure, Thomas Sakmar was acting-president from 2002.) Barry Coller, who invented the Abciximab, currently serves as the vice president for medical affairs. In all, as of October 2020, 38 Nobel Prize recipients have been associated with the university. In the mid-1970s, the university attracted a few prominent academicians in the humanities, such as Saul Kripke.

== Controversy ==
Reginald Archibald, an endocrinologist at the university from 1948 to 1982, allegedly abused dozens or hundreds of boys during his time at the university while studying growth problems in children, including molestation and photographing them naked. Officials at Rockefeller University knew of the legitimacy of the claims for years before notifying the public. The university and hospital issued a statement confirming that Archibald had "engaged in certain inappropriate conduct during patient examinations" and that they "deeply regret[ted]" any "pain and suffering" the former patients felt. New York State passed a law known as the Child Victims Act, which created a one-year window for civil suits brought by former child victims, allowing them to make cases against the university.
