= The Journal of General Physiology =

Journal of General Physiology
- Discipline: Physiology
- Language: English
- Edited by: David Eisner (physiologist)

Publication details
- History: 1918-present
- Publisher: Rockefeller University Press (United States)
- Frequency: Monthly
- Open access: After 6 months
- Impact factor: 4 (2021)

Standard abbreviations
- ISO 4: J. Gen. Physiol.

Indexing
- CODEN: JGPLAD
- ISSN: 0022-1295 (print); 1540-7748 (web)
- OCLC no.: 01390169

Links
- Journal homepage; Online access; Online archive

Journal of General Physiology is a peer-reviewed scientific journal published by Rockefeller University Press. The journal covers biological, chemical, or physical mechanisms of broad physiological significance. The major emphasis is on physiological problems at the cellular and molecular level.

== Editorial history ==
The journal was established in 1918 by Jacques Loeb. Editing duties were shared with Winthrop Osterhout of Harvard University. The initial rationale for the journal was stated in this extract from the 1918 announcement of publication:

Under the pressure of demands of medicine and other professions, physiology has developed in the direction of an applied science, with limited opportunity for the investigation of purely theoretical problems. On the other hand, the physico-chemical methods of analyzing life phenomena have thus far made little inroad into the domain of zoology and botany. Under these circumstances, it has happened that what might be regarded as the most fundamental of all the biological sciences, namely general physiology, has not come to have a journal of its own. It is this condition which the establishment of The Journal of General Physiology is intended to correct.

Following the death of Loeb in 1924, the editorship was passed to Osterhout, who moved to the Rockefeller Institute shortly thereafter. He was joined by William Crozier of Harvard and John Howard Northrop of Rockefeller, who served as fellow editors. For the next 20-plus years, this trio read and evaluated all submissions. They were joined in 1946 by Wallace Fenn and in 1950 by Alfred Mirsky and Lawrence Blinks. In the mid-1950s, Detlev Bronk and Frank Brink Jr. also became editors.

This practice of editorial review and evaluation continued into the mid-1950s. However, with Mirsky acting as a de facto editor in chief (and formally appointed as such in 1960), the practice of peer review using outside reviewers took hold. In 1960 associate editors were added. Mirsky was succeeded by Clarence Connolly, who served from 1961 to 1964. Prior to Connolly, it was common practice for editors to publish in the journal, as evidenced by Osterhout, Crozier, and Northrop each publishing over 100 articles (the time frame of Northrup's publications—the first in 1919, the last in 1968—bears out his longevity). Connolly was the first editor to not publish in the journal and subsequent editors have published infrequently. When an editor or associate editor does submit an article, the review process is handled by an outside guest editor, usually a member of the editorial board.

From 1964 to 1966, J. Woodland Hasting of Harvard University served as editor in chief. In 1966, the Rockefeller University recruited Paul Cranefield to establish a laboratory of cardiac physiology, and he became editor in chief. Under Cranefield, the journal began to be published on a monthly basis (it had been a bimonthly publication since its inception). Beginning in 1968 and continuing until 1984, Cranefield acted as the sole editor; though with the support of honorary editors and an editorial board. In 1984 Cranefield recruited several associate editors. At this time, the practice of weekly editorial meetings became standard, with discussion of reviews and consensus of the editors being the modus operandi that continues to the present day (though the meetings now partially occur in cyberspace). In 1995, Andersen succeeded Cranefield as editor in chief. In 2008, Andersen was succeeded by Edward Pugh Jr and then by Sharona Gordon in 2014. The current editor in chief, David Eisner, assumed the role in January 2020.

Over the past several years, the journal has instituted a series of Perspectives. The purpose of the Perspectives is to provide a forum in which scientific uncertainties or controversies can be discussed in an authoritative yet open manner. To frame the issue, two or more experts are invited to present brief points of view on the problem, which are published back-to-back in the journal. The Perspectives are accompanied by a short introductory editorial that introduces the problem and also invites the submission of comments in the form of Letters to the Editor.

While the journal is still printed as a monthly publication, articles are posted online daily.
