= Life Science Alliance =

- Discipline: life sciences, biomedicine
- Language: English
- Edited by: Tim Fessenden

Publication details
- History: April 2018–present
- Publisher: Life Science Alliance, LLC
- Frequency: Continuous
- Open access: Yes (Gold model)
- License: CC-BY 4.0
- Impact factor: 2.9 (2024)

Standard abbreviations
- ISO 4: Life Sci. Alliance

Indexing
- ISSN: 2575-1077

Links
- Journal homepage

Life Science Alliance is a peer-reviewed, open access and not-for-profit journal for the biomedical and life sciences. EMBO Press, Rockefeller University Press and Cold Spring Harbor Laboratory Press jointly established the journal in 2018. It is a signatory of the San Francisco Declaration on Research Assessment. The journal is currently edited by the Executive Editor Tim Fessenden.

== Abstracting, indexing and memberships ==
The journal is abstracted and indexed in Scopus, Web of Science, PubMed Central, and Medline. It is member of OASPA, DOAJ, CLOCKSS, COPE, ORCID, Crossref.

As of June 2025, Life Science Alliance has received an impact factor of 2.9, ranking in the first quartile (25% of the listed titles) of its category.
