= Richard Bing =

American cardiologist

- Born: October 12, 1909; Nuremberg, Germany
- Died: November 8, 2010 (aged 101); La Cañada Flintridge, California
- Education: Ludwig-Maximilians-Universität München; University of Bern
- Spouse: Mary Whipple
- Children: 4
- Scientific career
- Workplaces: Rockefeller University; Columbia University; Johns Hopkins University; Washington University in St. Louis; Wayne State University; Huntington Medical Research Institutes

Richard John Bing (12 October 1909 in Nuremberg, Germany – 8 November 2010 in La Cañada Flintridge, California) was a cardiologist who made significant contributions to his field of study. He was elected to the American Philosophical Society in 1995.

== Early life and education ==
Born in Nuremberg to a hops merchant and a professional singer, he studied at the Conservatory at the Nuremberg Gymnasium but also took an interest in medicine. Trying to determine which path to take, after an indifferent reception from Richard Strauss and being inspired by Arrowsmith, he went into medicine, earning a degree at the Ludwig-Maximilians-Universität München in 1934. His family—who were Jewish—left Nazi Germany shortly thereafter, and he studied further at the University of Bern, and was awarded another medical degree in 1935.

== Career as cardiologist ==
Bing then took a fellowship in Copenhagen at the Carlsberg Biological Institute. There he was visited by the Nobel prize-winning surgeon Alexis Carrel and aviator Charles Lindbergh. From that meeting came an invitation to work at the Rockefeller Institute in New York on the early development of machine perfusion. Following his work at the Rockefeller Institute, he took a position in physiology at the Columbia University College of Physicians and Surgeons, where he worked under Allen Whipple.

He took an assistant residency at Johns Hopkins University in order to allow him to join the Medical Corps. After two years in the Corps, he returned to Hopkins as a junior faculty member. There, he did pioneer research into cardiac metabolism, enabling the accurate measurement of the effects of drugs and drug candidates on the heart. After stints at Washington University School of Medicine and Wayne State University, he moved to California, and joined the Huntington Medical Research Institutes. There, he continued research, studying the chemistry of heart attacks, developing techniques for high-speed photography of the coronary vessels, and measurement of blood flow using nitric oxide.

Bing was life president of the International Society for Heart Research, having helped establish the group that evolved into that organization. He continued work into his 90s, and published more than 500 academic papers and books. Continuing his interest in music, he also wrote 300 works of music and five works of fiction.

== Personal life/death ==
Bing married Mary Whipple, the daughter of his supervisor at Columbia, in 1938 (died in 1990), and had two sons and two daughters; His daughter Barbara Bing died in 1999. He was the subject of a short 2009 documentary, Para Fuera: A Portrait of Dr. Richard J. Bing. He died November 8, 2010, aged 101.

== See also ==
- Lopez, Steve (September 12, 2010). "A remarkable life continues at age 100". Los Angeles Times.
- "Biography of Richard Bing at Bing Centennial 2009". Huntington Medical Research Institutes. Archived from the original on April 5, 2010.
- "Caltech Visiting Associate Richard J. Bing, 101". California Institute of Technology. November 10, 2010.
- "In Memoriam: Richard John Bing (1909–2010): The man "for all seasons" passes to the Elysian fields of science" (PDF). Hell J Nucl Med, Vol. 13, No. 3, Sept. - Dec. 2010.
