= Molecular Systems Biology =

- Discipline: Systems biology
- Language: English
- Edited by: M. Madan Babu

Publication details
- History: 2005–present
- Publisher: EMBO Press
- Frequency: Continuous
- Open access: Yes
- Impact factor: 6.7 (2025)

Standard abbreviations
- ISO 4: Mol. Syst. Biol.

Indexing
- ISSN: 1744-4292
- LCCN: 2005243561
- OCLC no.: 58795151

Links
- Journal homepage

Molecular Systems Biology is a peer-reviewed open-access scientific journal covering systems biology at the molecular level (examples include: genomics, proteomics, metabolomics, microbial systems, the integration of cell signaling and regulatory networks), synthetic biology, and systems medicine. It was established in 2005 and published by the Nature Publishing Group on behalf of the European Molecular Biology Organization. As of December 2013, it is published by EMBO Press.
