= European Molecular Biology Organization =

Organization of researchers in the life science

The European Molecular Biology Organization (EMBO)
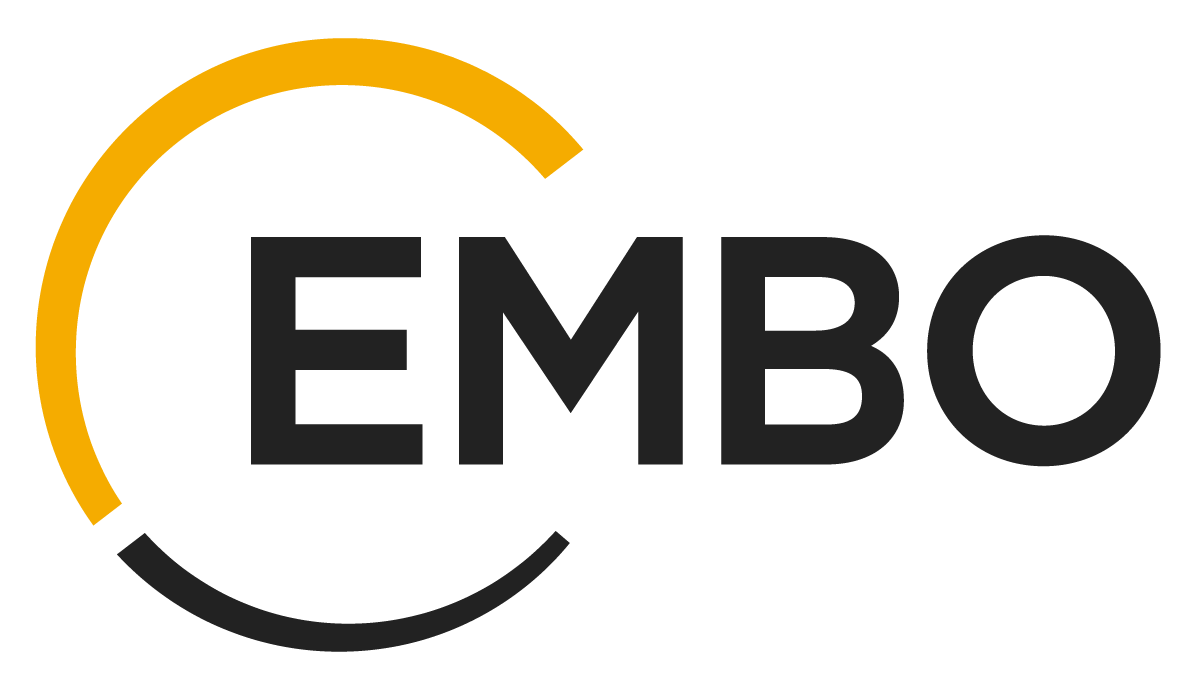
- Formation: 1964
- Purpose: Promote life science research in Europe and beyond
- Headquarters: Heidelberg, Germany
- Members: 2,100 members
- Director: Fiona Watt
- Key people: Maria Leptin (Director 2010 - 2021); Hermann Bujard (Director 2007 - 2010); Frank Gannon (Director 1994 - 2007); John Tooze (Director 1973 - 1994); Raymond Appleyard (Director 1965 - 1973); Paul Nurse (Secretary General); Maria Rescigno (Chair of the EMBO Council)
- Website: embo.org

The European Molecular Biology Organization (EMBO) is a professional, non-profit organization of more than 2,100 life scientists. Its goal is to promote research in life science and enable international exchange between scientists. It co-funds courses, workshops and conferences, publishes five scientific journals and supports individual scientists. The organization was founded in 1964 and is a founding member of the Initiative for Science in Europe. As of 2022 the Director of EMBO is Fiona Watt, a stem cell researcher, professor at King's College London and a group leader at the European Molecular Biology Laboratory.

== Conferences and journals ==
In recent years, EMBO has funded more than 80 meetings with more than 12,000 participants each year.

EMBO publishes five peer-reviewed scientific journals: The EMBO Journal, EMBO Reports, Molecular Systems Biology, EMBO Molecular Medicine, and Life Science Alliance.

== History ==
The European Molecular Biology Organization (EMBO) was launched in July 1964 after a group of European biologists had discussed the idea earlier at a meeting in Ravello. The initial goals of EMBO consisted of creating a central European laboratory for life sciences and increasing scientific interactions between researchers in Europe. At the Ravello meeting, Max Perutz was elected as the first EMBO chairman and John Kendrew as secretary general.

Initially, 140 biologists were elected EMBO members and in 1969, the European Molecular Biology Conference (EMBC) was set up as a political body with 14 countries as initial members. Since 1964, scientists have been elected annually as members of EMBO based on excellence in research. There are currently more than 2,100 Members of the European Molecular Biology Organization, 92 of whom have received the Nobel Prize. As of 2023, there are 31 EMBC Member States and five EMBO / EMBC global partners. Agreements are in place with India (Department of Biotechnology, DBT), Singapore (Agency for Science, Technology and Research, A*STAR), Taiwan (National Science and Technology Council, NSTC, and Academia Sinica), Chile (National Agency for Research and Development of Chile, ANID) and Japan (Japan Science and Technology Agency, JST).

In 1982, the EMBO Journal was launched, in 1986, the EMBO Gold Medal, an annual award for young scientists, was established. The EMBO Young Investigator Programme which awards grants to young group leader was established in 2000 and four additional journals were launched in 2000 (EMBO Reports), 2005 (Molecular Systems Biology), 2008 (EMBO Molecular Medicine) and 2019 (Life Science Alliance). Life Science Alliance is co-published with Rockefeller University Press and Cold Spring Harbor Laboratory Press. In 2022, Fiona Watt was appointed sixth director of EMBO succeeding the previous EMBO Directors Raymond Appleyard, John Tooze, Frank Gannon, Hermann Bujard and Maria Leptin.

In 2011, EMBO established a Policy Programme which interacts with policymakers and provides analysis of concerns emerging from advances in scientific research.

Closely affiliated organisations to EMBO include the European Molecular Biology Laboratory (EMBL) and the Federation of European Biochemical Societies (FEBS) which like EMBO, primarily operate in the European Research Area (ERA).
