= Shimon Schuldiner =

Israeli biochemist

- שמעון שולדינר
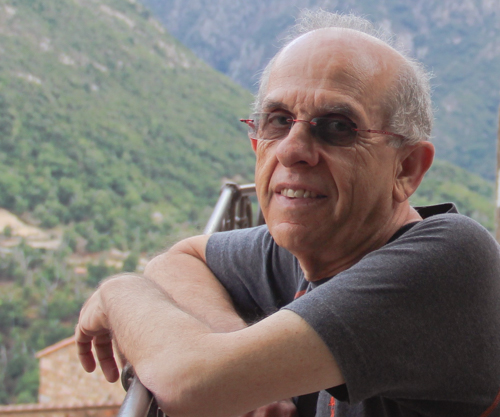
- Born: August 10, 1946 (age 80); Buenos Aires, Argentina
- Known for: Research of trans-membrane transporters
- Scientific career
- Fields: Biochemistry
- Workplaces: The Hebrew University of Jerusalem

Shimon Schuldiner (Hebrew: שמעון שולדינר; born August 10, 1946) is an Israeli biochemist. He has made important contributions to the understanding of proteins that couple the movement of ions and other molecules across membranes. Schuldiner is Mathilda Marks-Kennedy Professor at the Alexander Silberman Institute of Life Sciences, the Hebrew University of Jerusalem. He received a B.Sc. in 1967 and an M.Sc. in 1968 from the Hebrew University of Jerusalem, and a Ph.D. from the Weizmann Institute of Science in Rehovot in 1973.

== Biography ==
Schuldiner was born on August 10, 1946, in Buenos Aires, Argentina, to Hana Joszpe and Berko Schuldiner, who were Jewish immigrants from Ukraine. In 1964 he emigrated to Israel, where he has been living since. He earned a B.Sc. in 1967 and a M.Sc. in 1968 from the Hebrew University of Jerusalem, the latter working with Itzhak Ohad. In 1973 he received a Ph.D. for work performed in the laboratory of Mordhay Avron (z"l) at the Weizmann Institute of Science in Rehovot . From 1973 to 1976 he did postdoctoral research in the laboratory of Howard Ronald Kaback at the Roche Institute for Molecular Biology in Nutley, New Jersey. In 1976 he returned to Israel and joined the Department of Molecular Biology at Hadassah Medical School, and in 1990 he moved to the Alexander Silberman Institute of Life Sciences, both at the Hebrew University of Jerusalem. Between 1999 and 2002, he served as Chairman of the Silberman Institute. Schuldiner is married to Monica Schuldiner, with whom he has two children and six grandchildren. He and his wife are long-time supporters of civil rights in Israel and of the advancement of peace. His son Oren and his daughter-in-law Maya Schuldiner are also research biologists, working at the Weizmann Institute of Science. His son Ilan is a physiotherapist at Maccabi Health Services and his daughter in law, Hila Zadka, is a researcher at The Israel Center for Disease Control, Israel Ministry of Health.

== Career ==
Schuldiner is a world expert in the expression, purification, and characterization of membrane proteins. Specifically, he focuses on the multidrug antiporter EmrE. Investigation of its subunit structure led the Schuldiner Group to propose a dimer of topologically parallel subunits. This led to a long-running controversy over EmrE topology that eventually led Schuldiner to demonstrate that both parallel and antiparallel dimers are functional. His work on the Vesicular Monoamine Transporter (VMAT), elucidating its mechanism of action, is essential for the development of better drugs for brain disorders.

== Selected articles ==
1. Schuldiner, S., Rottenberg, H., and Avron, M. (1972) Membrane potential as a driving force for ATP synthesis in chloroplasts. FEBS Lett. 28, 173-176
2. Ramos, S., Schuldiner, S., and Kaback, H. R. (1976) The electrochemical gradient of protons and its relationship to active transport in Escherichia coli membrane vesicles. Proc. Natl. Acad. Sci. USA 73, 1892-1896
3. Schuldiner, S., and Kaback, H. R. (1975) Membrane Potential and Active Transport in Membrane Vesicles from Escherichia coli. Biochem 14, 5451-5461
4. Taglicht, D., Padan, E., and Schuldiner, S. (1993) Proton-sodium stoichiometry of NhaA, an electrogenic antiporter from Escherichia coli. J. Biol. Chem. 268, 5382-5387
5. Schuldiner, S., Shirvan, A., Stern-Bach, Y., Steiner-Mordoch, S., Yelin, R., and Laskar, O. (1994) From bacterial antibiotic resistance to neurotransmitter uptake. A common theme of cell survival. Ann. N. Y. Acad. Sci. 733, 174-184
6. Yaffe, D., Radestock, S., Shuster, Y., Forrest, L. R., and Schuldiner, S. (2013) Identification of Molecular Hinge Points Mediating Alternating Access in the Vesicular Monoamine Transporter VMAT2. Proceedings of the National Academy of Sciences 110, E1332-E1341
7. Stern-Bach, Y., Greenberg-Ofrath, N., Flechner, I., and Schuldiner, S. (1990) Identification and Purification of a Functional Amine Transporter from Bovine Chromaffin Granules. J. Biol. Chem. 265, 3961-3966
8. Yerushalmi, H., Lebendiker, M., and Schuldiner, S. (1995) EmrE, an Escherichia coli 12-kDa multidrug transporter, exchanges toxic cations and H+ and is soluble in organic solvents. J. Biol. Chem. 270, 6856-6863
9. Nasie, I., Steiner-Mordoch, S., Gold, A., and Schuldiner, S. (2010) Topologically Random Insertion of Emre Supports a Pathway for Evolution of Inverted Repeats in Ion-Coupled Transporters. J. Biol. Chem. 285, 15234-15244
10. Shuster, Y., Steiner-Mordoch, S., Alon Cudkowicz, N., and Schuldiner, S. (2016) A Transporter Interactome Is Essential for the Acquisition of Antimicrobial Resistance to Antibiotics. PLoS One 11, e0152917
