= EMBO Reports =

- Discipline: Molecular biology
- Language: English
- Edited by: Bernd Pulverer

Publication details
- History: 2000–present
- Publisher: EMBO Press
- Frequency: Monthly
- Open access: Delayed, after 12 months
- Impact factor: 6.0 (2025)

Standard abbreviations
- ISO 4: EMBO Rep.

Indexing
- ISSN: 1469-221X (print); 1469-3178 (web)

Links
- Journal homepage

EMBO Reports is a peer-reviewed scientific journal covering research related to biology at a molecular level. It publishes primary research papers, reviews, and essays and opinion. It also features commentaries on the social impact of advances in the life sciences and the converse influence of society on science. A sister journal to The EMBO Journal, EMBO Reports was established in 2000 and was published on behalf of the European Molecular Biology Organization by Nature Publishing Group since 2003. It is now published by EMBO Press.
