= Cardiovascular Drugs and Therapy =

- Discipline: Cardiology, pharmacotherapy
- Language: English
- Edited by: Yochai Birnbaum

Publication details
- History: 1987-present
- Publisher: Springer Science+Business Media
- Frequency: Bimonthly
- Impact factor: 3.727 (2020)

Standard abbreviations
- ISO 4: Cardiovasc. Drugs Ther.

Indexing
- CODEN: CDTHET
- ISSN: 0920-3206 (print); 1573-7241 (web)
- LCCN: 89646567
- OCLC no.: 15991683

Links
- Journal homepage; Online archive

Cardiovascular Drugs and Therapy is a bimonthly peer-reviewed medical journal covering pharmacotherapy as it relates to cardiology. It was established in 1987 and is published by Springer Science+Business Media.The editor-in-chief is Yochai Birnbaum (Baylor College of Medicine). According to the Journal Citation Reports, the journal has a 2020 impact factor of 3.727.
