= International Society for Heart Research =

The International Society for Heart Research began as an "International Study Group for Research in Cardiac Metabolism" in Dubrovnik in 1968; at the 1976 World Congress in Tokyo, it adopted the name "International Society for Heart Research". It currently has over 3,000 members and comprises 8 international Sections (Australasian, South-East Asian, Chinese, European, Indian, Japanese, Latin American and North American). The current president is Dr. Yoshihiko Saito Nara.

The Society publishes its own journals (Journal of Molecular and Cellular Cardiology, (Journal of Molecular and Cellular Cardiology Plus (JMCC-Plus)) and newsletter (Heart News and Views).

The ISHR has developed a number of awards (Peter Harris Distinguished Scientist Award, Research Achievement Award, Outstanding Investigator Award, three named Distinguished Lecture Awards and Distinguished Leader Award for Faculty). It also gives the Richard J. Bing Award for Young Investigators, an award named after its first President and founder.
