= George Stark =

American chemist (born 1933)

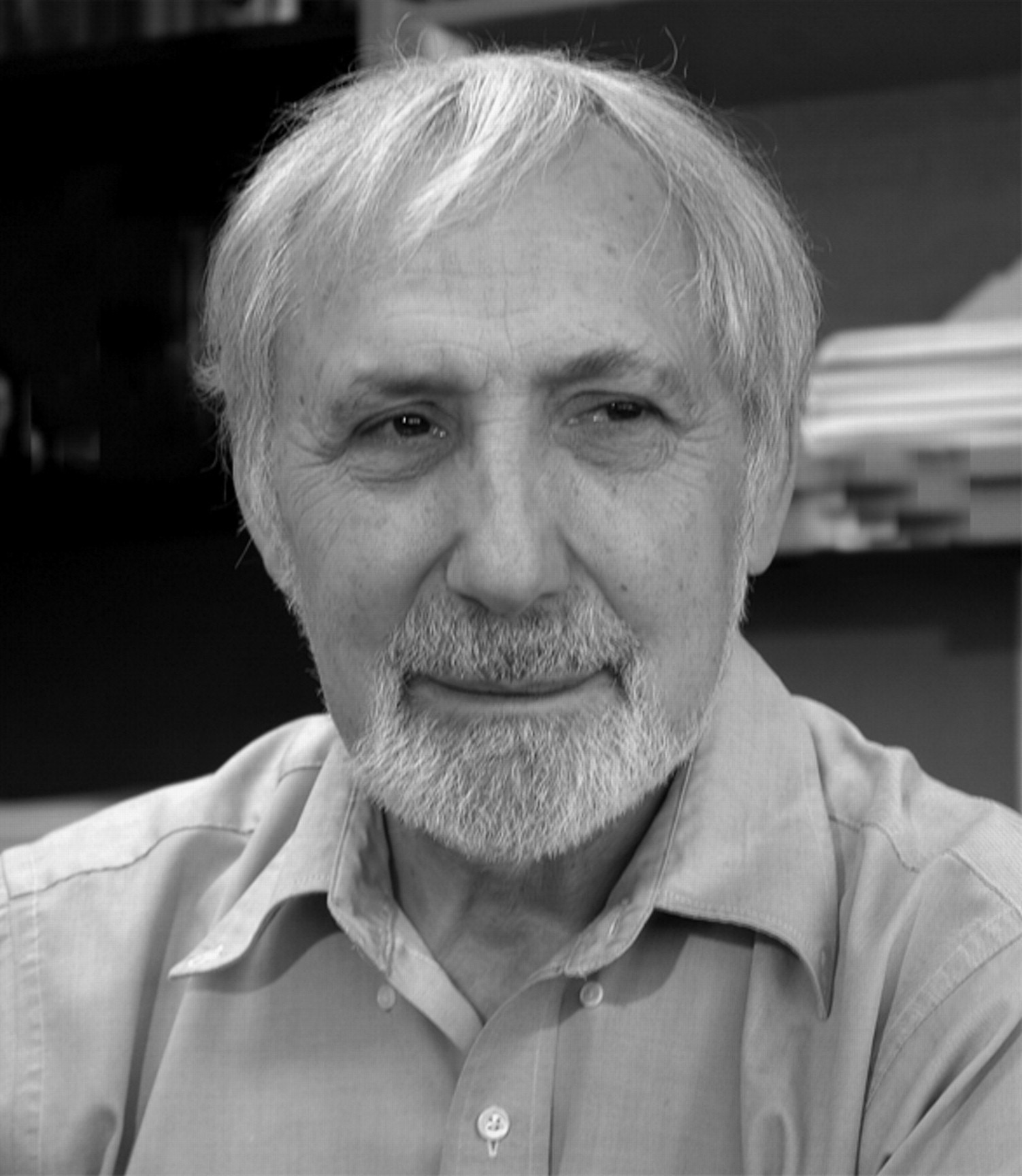
- Born: 1933 (age 92–93); New York City, U.S.
- Occupations: Chemist; biochemist; professor

Academic background
- Education: Columbia College; Columbia University

George Stark (born 1933) is an American chemist and biochemist. His research interests include protein and enzyme function and modification, interferons and cytokines, signal transduction, and gene expression.

== Personal life ==
George Stark was born in New York City in 1933. His father, Jack Stark, was a restaurant owner, and his mother, Florence Stark, was a bookkeeper. He was the youngest of three children, with two older sisters, Edna and Bernyce.

Stark and his family moved to semi-rural Maryland (around the Washington, D.C. area) at the start of World War II. His father opened a restaurant named “Stark's Beef and Beans,” which Stark would often help at. The family remained there until Stark was through his third year of high school, after which they relocated back to New York City, NY in 1950.

Stark would then finish his education in New York City. Over the course of his career, he relocated to various cities to conduct his research ranging from California to the United Kingdom. His most recent employment landed him in Cleveland, Ohio.

He met his wife, Mary Beck, during his undergraduate years, and the two married shortly after they both graduated. She went on to become a radiation physicist. They have two children, Janna and Robert.

== Education and career ==
While living in the Washington, D.C. area, Stark attended Hyattsville High School in Maryland for three years. He then went on to attend the Bronx High School of Science for his final year.

Stark went on to receive his undergraduate and graduate degrees from Columbia College of Columbia University. He received his undergraduate degree in 1955 and his Ph.D. in 1959. He began his undergraduate studies as a premedical student but changed his path after having difficulty with a comparative anatomy course. His graduate studies were in the field of chemistry, and he did his research in the lab of Charles Dawson, who was a professor of organic chemistry and biochemistry. He then completed a postdoctoral fellowship at Rockefeller University, where he did extensive research involving different enzymes.

Following his fellowship, he secured a research position at Stanford University, where he conducted research and served as a professor of biochemistry for 20 years. Following several sabbaticals in London, he accepted an offer to permanently work at the Imperial Cancer Research Fund (ICRF) in 1983. Here, he ran a laboratory and worked as the associate director of Research.

In 1992, to avoid ICRF mandated retirement, Stark returned to the United States to continue his research. He settled in Cleveland, Ohio, where he worked as a chairman at the Cleveland Clinic Foundation, where he helped expand the Lerner Research Institute from 1992 to 2002. During this time, he also worked as a professor of genetics at Case Western Reserve University. He later served as a chair of the advisory committee at the Center for Gene Regulation in Health and Disease at Cleveland State University, and he assisted in development of the Cellular and Molecular Medicine Specialization (CMMS) program that was jointly offered by Cleveland State University and the Lerner Research Institute. He is currently continuing his research in Cancer Biology at the Cleveland Clinic Foundation.

== Research ==
Stark is the author of over 250 publications and has worked alongside several Nobel Laureates. Most of his research is centered on the use of enzymes, the modification, cleavage, and analysis of proteins, and the manipulation of biochemical pathways.

In graduate school at Columbia, Stark investigated ascorbic acid oxidase, which was concentrated in the skin of yellow crook-necked squash, and focused specifically on the role of its sulfhydryl groups. Previous work had been done on inhibition of ascorbic acid oxidase, and observations led researchers to postulate that the sulfhydryl group may only be exposed during enzymatic activity, and thus crucial for oxidizing ascorbic acid. Through inhibition studies with p-chloro-mercuribenzoic acid, Stark came to the conclusion that the functionality of this particular enzyme is not dependent upon its sulfhydryl functional groups. The details and results of these studies were explained in Stark's PhD dissertation.

During his fellowship at Rockefeller, he worked with Nobel Laureates Stanford Moore and William Howard Stein. He did significant work with cyanate, which can be produced from urea. His experiments set out to explain why enzymatic activity, namely of ribonuclease, decreased when in solution with urea. Using chromatography, Stark was able to detect a change in the amino acid sequence of ribonuclease, specifically the loss of lysine residues, in the presence of cyanate, and so he postulated that the cyanate facilitated the carbamylation of amino groups in the urea solution. He then conducted several experiments to evaluate his hypothesis using various proteins and urea. Upon further chromatography analysis and acid hydrolysis of the modified proteins, Stark came to the conclusion that cyanate indeed reacts with amino and sulfhydryl groups, with the latter being a more rapid reaction. Stark and his colleague Derek Smyth then used these findings to develop a new method of determining the N-terminal residues to assist with sequencing peptide chains. Essentially, cyanate reacts with the amino groups and exposes them in order for them to react with acid and form hydantoins, which can be broken down into their corresponding amino acids. This process is similar to the dinitrofluorobenzene method for sequencing proteins.

Following his Rockefeller fellowship, Stark was recruited by Arthur Kornberg, another Nobel Laureate, to conduct research at Stanford. His research was now focused on aspartate transcarbamylase, which catalyzes the transfer of a carbamyl group from phosphate to aspartate, and he and his colleague Kim Collins investigated a certain intermediate of this reaction, namely N-phosphonacetyl-l-aspartate, better known as PALA. They postulated that this particular intermediate could be a feasible inhibitor, and after synthesizing it, found that it indeed inhibited ATCase. This is where Stark's research on mammalian cells began. Aspartate transcarbamylase is one of the first three enzymes necessary for de novo synthesis of pyrimidine nucleotides, and after Stark was able to isolate this protein complex in hamster cells, he then treated them with PALA and found this pathway inhibited. Furthermore, with another colleague Randall Johnson, Stark began testing the use of PALA as a treatment for tumors in mice cells, with significant rudimentary results. PALA was able to successfully inhibit growth of transplantable tumors, but was less successful with solid tumors. It was later found that this ability did not translate well to human cells and has minimal therapeutic uses on its own.

Another major advancement made by Stark and his colleagues at Stanford was the development of the Northern blot and Western blot techniques, which allow researchers to more efficiently detect isolated mRNA. To do this, they first developed a method to couple DNA with diazotized cellulose, which was reactive with both DNA and RNA. They were then able to use gel electrophoresis and cellulose chromatography paper to isolate mRNA molecules, and then probe them with complementary DNA strands. In contrast with the previously used Southern blot, this method allowed for the analysis of RNA instead of DNA. A similar method was used for identification of proteins, leading to the method referred to as the Western blot., variations of which were also reported by two other groups, working independently at about the same time: Harry Towbin and coworkers in Basel, Switzerland, and W. Neil Burnett in Robert Nowinski's lab at Fred Hutchinson Cancer Research Center in Seattle, who also coined the name "Western" blotting. The Towbin group used secondary antibodies for detection, which is now the predominant method in Western blotting.

Some of Stark's most important advancements have been within the realm of interferon-dependent signalling. These studies began at Stanford and continued during his time in London, where his lab focused on these pathways, along with mechanisms of gene amplification, and this research has continued throughout the rest of his career. Stark's lab group, in collaboration with Ian M. Kerr’s group at the Imperial Cancer Research Fund, was attempting to identify the key components of IFN-dependent signaling. Interferons induce antiviral activities, inhibit cell growth, control apoptosis, and are implicated in promoting immune responses. Concurrently with James E. Darnell’s lab group, Stark's group was able to uncover a new direct signal transduction pathway through their study of interferon alpha and interferon gamma. This particular pathway, better known as the JAK-STAT signaling pathway, is characterized by the interaction of interferon receptors at the cell's surface with Janus kinases (JAKs), which are then able to phosphorylate substrate proteins called signal transducers and activators of transcription (STATs). These STAT proteins then migrate to the nucleus and then initiate transcription. These proteins are also involved in the resistance of cancer cells to DNA damaging therapies, and this is just one of the many topics that Stark has focused on during his research career at the Case Comprehensive Cancer Center.

== Awards and legacy ==
=== Awards ===
- American Society of Biological Chemists 1986 H. A. Sober Memorial Lectureship
- 1997 Milstein Award Winner for Excellence in Interferon and Cytokine Research
- University of Connecticut, Department of Molecular and Cell Biology 1998 Hugh Clark Distinguished Lectureship
- Distinguished Scientist of the Lerner Research Institute
- Cancer Research Institute 1999 William B. Coley Award for Distinguished Research in Basic and Tumor Immunology
- 2019 Steven C. Beering Award, 37th annual recipient

=== Memberships ===
- Member of the US National Academy of Sciences
- Member of the National Academy of Medicine
- Member of the European Molecular Biology Organisation
- Fellow of the American Association for the Advancement of Science
- Fellow of the Royal Society of London, elected in 1990
- Representative for the American Society for Biochemistry and Molecular Biology in the U.S. National Committee for Biochemistry and Molecular Biology from 1995 to 2000

=== Legacy ===
In 2015, Stark and his wife endowed a graduate scholarship at the Center for Gene Regulation in Health and Disease at Cleveland State University.
