= Sofia Simmonds =

American biochemist (1917–2007)

Sophia S. Simmonds
- Born: July 31, 1917
- Died: July 27, 2007 (aged 89); New Haven, Connecticut
- Education: Barnard College; Cornell University
- Known for: General Biochemistry (with Joseph Fruton)
- Spouse: Joseph Fruton
- Awards: Garvan–Olin Medal (1969)
- Scientific career
- Fields: Biochemistry, microbiology
- Workplaces: Yale University
- Doctoral advisor: Vincent du Vigneaud

Sofia S. "Topsy" Simmonds (July 31, 1917 – July 27, 2007) was an American biochemist who studied amino acid metabolism and peptide metabolism in E. coli. Following training with Vincent du Vigneaud at Cornell University, she spent most of her career at Yale University. After decades as a researcher and then associate professor there, Simmonds became a full professor of biochemistry in 1975, and later served as Associate Dean of Yale College. With her husband Joseph Fruton, Simmonds coauthored the influential General Biochemistry, the first comprehensive biochemistry textbook. Simmonds received the American Chemical Society's Garvan Medal in 1969.

== Youth, education, and early career ==
Sofia, who went by the childhood nickname "Topsy" throughout her life, was the second child of Lionel Julius Simmonds and Clara Gottfried Simmonds. She was raised in Manhattan, where her father was the superintendent of the Hebrew Orphan Asylum. After graduating high school, she met biochemistry graduate student Joseph Fruton in 1933; the two began courting and they married in 1936. After high school and several months as a laboratory assistant at the Columbia College of Physicians and Surgeons (where Fruton was earning his PhD), Simmonds attended Barnard College, where she earned a BA in chemistry in 1938. After that, she started graduate work in the lab of Hans Thacher Clarke (who had been Fruton's advisor), but soon transferred to Cornell Medical College to work under Vincent du Vigneaud. She worked in Vigneaud's laboratory on the study of transmethylation, completing her PhD in biochemistry in 1942 and continuing as a research associate until she and Fruton moved to New Haven, Connecticut in 1945.

== Yale ==
In 1945, Fruton and Simmonds began working at Yale: Fruton as an associate professor and Simmonds as an instructor of physiological chemistry. The next year, Simmonds joined the Yale laboratory of Edward Tatum. Opportunities for career advancement for women scientists were very limited at the time, and discrimination (often in the form of anti-nepotism rules) prevented the advancement of women scientists who worked in the same field as their husbands, as Simmonds did.

Fruton became a full professor in 1950, and subsequently became chairman of his department; Simmonds only became associate professor by 1959, and she was initially denied promotion to full professorship in 1966, only reaching that rank in 1975, nearly 30 years after starting at Yale. In his memoir Eighty Years, Fruton recounts that the "delay had adverse effect on Topsy's personal research, but the recognition of the merits of her scientific work and the quality of her contributions as a teacher could no longer be denied" by then. Fruton and Simmonds remained at Yale in the 1950s, when Fruton had the opportunity to join departments at other universities, in part because Simmonds—as a woman and the wife of a senior scientist—would have had even fewer opportunities for an independent career elsewhere.

In 1969, after being nominated by Edward Tatum, Simmonds received the Garvan Medal of the American Chemical Society, which recognizes contributions to chemistry by women scientists.

== Books ==
- Fruton, Joseph S., and Sofia Simmonds. General Biochemistry. New York: John Wiley & Sons Inc. 1953 (first edition), 1958 (second edition).
- Shearer, Benjamin F. (1997). Notable women in the physical sciences : a biographical dictionary (1. publ. ed.). Westport, Conn.: Greenwood Press. ISBN 0313293031.

== Bibliography ==
- Fruton, Joseph S. (1994). Eighty Years. New Haven, Connecticut: Epikouros Press. pp. 66–119. ISBN 0964046709.
