= Wilhelm Eschweiler =

German chemist (1860–1936)

- Born: December 1, 1860; Euskirchen, Kingdom of Prussia
- Died: March 21, 1936 (aged 75)
- Education: University of Rostock
- Known for: Eschweiler–Clarke reaction
- Scientific career
- Fields: Chemistry
- Workplaces: Technical University of Hanover

Wilhelm Eschweiler (born December 1, 1860, in Euskirchen and died March 21, 1936) was a German chemist. He was a professor at the Technical University of Hanover.

== Biography ==
He passed his final exam (Obersekunda) at the Knickeberg Institute in Telgte and completed his pharmacy studies in Goch. He then visited pharmacies in Düsseldorf, Frankfurt, Elberfeld, Wiesbaden, Metz, and Hamburg, and studied pharmacy at the Ludwig-Maximilians-Universität München, passing the state exam in 1886.

A year later, he became an assistant to Karl Kraut (chemist) at the Inorganic Institute of the Technical University of Hanover. During this time, he earned his doctorate in 1889 at the University of Rostock, focusing on contributions to the understanding of formaldehyde. In 1892, he became a private lecturer in analytical chemistry at Hanover, where he also taught food chemistry. In 1895, he received the title of professor, and in 1921, he became an associate professor. From 1927 to 1929, he was a senior assistant. From 1900 to 1934, he lectured in analytical chemistry.

He particularly studied mineral dyes, polythionic acids, and was considered an expert in explosives and gunpowder. In the latter field, he often acted as an industry consultant and investigated, among other things, the Oppau explosion at Ludwigshafen-Oppau in 1921. Much of his research was published in the theses, diplomas, and dissertations of his students. One of his students was Fritz Strassmann.

The Eschweiler-Clarke methylation is named after him and Hans Thacher Clarke. Eschweiler published work on this in 1905, and Clarke in 1933. Sometimes, it is known only as the Eschweiler method · .

== Publications ==
- "On the Constitution of Acid Amides", Berichte der deutschen chemischen Gesellschaft ("Reports of the German Chemical Society"), year 30, 1897, number 8.
- "Replacement of Hydrogen Atoms Bound to Nitrogen by the Methyl Group with the Help of Formaldehyde", Berichte der deutschen chemischen Gesellschaft ("Reports of the German Chemical Society"), vol. 38, no. 1, 1905.
