= Joseph S. Fruton =

Polish-American biochemist and historian of science

- Born: Joseph Fruchtgarten; May 14, 1912; Częstochowa, Poland
- Died: July 29, 2007 (aged 95); New Haven, Connecticut
- Education: Columbia University 1934
- Known for: General Biochemistry (with Sofia Simmonds; in its time the best known textbook of biochemistry)
- Spouse: Sofia Simmonds
- Awards: Eli Lilly Award in Biological Chemistry (1944); Dexter Award (1993)
- Scientific career
- Fields: Biochemistry, history of science
- Workplaces: Rockefeller Institute Yale University
- Doctoral advisor: Hans Thacher Clarke

Joseph Stewart Fruton (May 14, 1912 – July 29, 2007), born Joseph Fruchtgarten, was a Polish-American biochemist and historian of science. His most significant scientific work involved synthetic peptides and their interactions with proteases; with his wife Sofia Simmonds he also published an influential textbook, General Biochemistry (1953; 1958). From 1970 until his death, Fruton worked extensively on the history of science, particularly the history of biochemistry and molecular biology.

== Childhood and education ==
Joseph Fruchtgarten was born in Częstochowa, Poland; his father Shama Nuta (Charles) Fruchtgarten was a grain merchant, and his mother Ella (Aisenstadt) Fruchtgarten was a French teacher. Like many other Polish Jews, the Fruchtgartens immigrated to the United States shortly before the outbreak of World War I. They lived in New York City from 1913 to 1917, and in April 1917 they moved to Minsk (then occupied by the Red Army in the midst of the Russian Civil War). Between 1917 and 1923, Fruchtgarten attended school intermittently, moving from Minsk to Siedlce to Warsaw to Berlin, and learning French, German and Latin (in addition to Polish and English). In 1923, the Fruchtgartens returned to New York and changed their name to Fruton to avoid being targets of anti-Semitism. Joseph Fruton followed his father in rejecting religion, but learned early on "not to advertise either [his] Jewishness or [his] atheism."

After a few months at De Witt Clinton High School, Fruton joined the first class of students at James Madison High School. He graduated in 1927, excelling particularly in chemistry. He applied to Columbia University, and after an initial rejection—possibly because he was only 15 at the time, possibly because the school had already admitted the quota of New York Jews—his mother convinced an admissions official to reverse the decision. Inspired by the character Max Gottlieb from the Sinclair Lewis novel Arrowsmith, Fruton planned his Columbia education around becoming a scientist. The lectures and lab-work of organic chemist John M. Nelson turned Fruton on to biochemistry. He received his degree in chemistry in 1931, and entered graduate school in the Department of Biological Chemistry in the Columbia College of Physicians and Surgeons, working under Hans Thacher Clarke. Fruton's PhD work focused on "the lability of cystine in alkali", although he developed a broad interest in the range of biochemistry-related research being pursued at the College of Physicians and Surgeons.

During graduate school Fruton also became active politically, opposing fascism, militarism and anti-Semitism. In 1933 he met Sophia "Topsy" Simmonds, whom he married in 1936. Upon completing his PhD in May 1934, Fruton became a research assistant to Max Bergmann at the Rockefeller Institute for Medical Research.

== Research at the Rockefeller Institute ==
Fruton was a researcher at the Rockefeller Institute from 1934 to 1945, part of Max Bergmann's long-term and very successful research program in protein chemistry. In his earliest work there, Fruton tested the stereochemical specificity of dipeptidase. Under the tutelage of fellow Bergmann lab researcher Leonidas Zervas, a pioneer in peptide synthesis, Fruton synthesized stereospecific dipeptides and other small peptides as enzyme substrates. Fruton and his colleagues found significant instances of specificity in a range of proteases—observations that were relevant to the ongoing theoretical discussions of protein structure. His most significant discovery at the Rockefeller Institute was a synthetic peptide substrate for pepsin, contrary to the common idea that pepsin would not act on short synthetic peptides. As a side project, he also worked on applications of Bergmann and Zervas's carbobenzoxy method of peptide synthesis and some of the associated side reactions.

Between December 1941 and the end of World War II, research in Bergmann's lab shifted from basic protein chemistry to war-related research under the National Defense Research Committee, part of the Office of Scientific Research and Development. Fruton studied the chemistry of nitrogen mustards. In 1943, Fruton won the American Chemical Society's Eli Lilly Award.

== Biochemistry at Yale ==
In 1945, after Max Bergmann's death, Fruton joined the Yale University Department of Physiological Chemistry (part of the medical school) —headed then by C. N. Hugh Long—where he taught biological chemistry to medical students. Fruton joined a growing science faculty, which included the editor of the Journal of Biological Chemistry, Rudolph Anderson; biochemist Edward Tatum also came to Yale at the same time. In addition to research and teaching at Yale, in 1948 Fruton visited the laboratories of several eminent biochemists: Kaj Linderstrøm-Lang's chemistry department at the Carlsberg Laboratory; Hugo Theorell's lab in Stockholm; and Alexander Todd's lab at Cambridge University. At the end of his five-year appointment as assistant professor, Fruton was promoted to full professor received a joint appointment in the chemistry department—at the time, the only Jewish full professor in the medical school. By 1952, he was elected to the National Academy of Sciences, and that year he also became chairman of the Department of Physiological Chemistry (which was renamed Biochemistry, reflecting the shift in research focus from medical to general biological problems). He was elected to the American Academy of Arts and Sciences in 1953.

Most of Fruton's early research at Yale was funded by a grant from the Rockefeller Foundation; Warren Weaver was making enzymology one of the Foundation's research focuses. Fruton headed a growing lab that included doctoral students, postdoctoral researchers, and technical assistants. The two main areas of research were the action of proteolytic enzymes and the chemical (as opposed to biological) synthesis of peptides (the substrates used to explore the enzymatic reactions). Members of Fruton's lab studied cathepsin C and several other peptidases, as well as proteinases that catalyzed transpeptidation, which was thought (and ultimately confirmed) to be part of the biosynthesis of proteins. Rather than leading a team effort focused on a small number of high-priority problems, Fruton allowed members of his laboratory to choose their own problems (usually within the broad bounds of protein synthesis and proteinases). Ph.D. students and postdoctoral researchers who worked in Fruton's lab include: Mary Ellen Jones, Melvin Fried, Hannelore Würz, Peter Heinrich, Karen Nilsson, Bob Metrione, Yoshihiro Okuda, George Taborsky, Christine Zioudrou, Maxine Singer, Louis Cohen, Frederick Newth, John Thanassi, Charles Drey, Derek George Smyth, Atsuo Nagamatsu, and Milton Winitz. A number of prominent biochemists from outside Yale also spent time in Fruton's biochemistry department during his tenure as chair, including: Harry Kroll, Rosabelle McManus, John Clark Lewis, Herbert Gutfreund, Max Gruber, Frank Hird, Vernon Ingram, Hans Kornberg, Dimitrios Theodoropoulos, and Hans Tuppy.

In 1953, Fruton and Simmonds completed the textbook General Biochemistry, which became one of the most influential textbooks for a generation of biochemistry students. They produced a second edition in 1958.

=== Administrative work ===
In 1959, after offering advice to Yale president A. Whitney Griswold on strengthening the sciences at Yale, Fruton became director of the division of science, a position he held until 1962. His work led to the creation of the short-lived department of molecular biology and biophysics (MBB), although his initial proposal to create a similar department that combined the existing biophysics and biochemistry departments was rejected. Fruton became burnt out on Yale politics after an extended conflict with provost Kingman Brewster, in which Brewster attempted to bypass Fruton's science advisory committee and create a molecular biology department independent of biochemistry department; the MBB department was created only after Brewster had failed to attract a prominent scientist from outside Yale to head a molecular biology department, and the department of biochemistry remained separate as part of the medical school until the creation of the department of molecular biophysics & biochemistry (MB&B) in 1969 (which was itself created after a lengthy and unsuccessful attempt to find a suitably eminent replacement for Fruton to head the department of biochemistry).

Fruton was elected to the American Philosophical Society in 1968. He and Sophia Simmonds traveled abroad during the 1962–1963 academic year, returning just as the MBB department was being created and the Department of Biochemistry was entering a "crisis" because of the loss of experienced faculty (in particular, Fred Richards, the new head of MBB, and Ernie Pollard, who had left to head a biophysics department at Penn State).

== Death ==
Fruton died two days after his wife in New Haven on 29 July 2007.

== Works ==
- General Biochemistry (1953, 1958), with Sophia Simmonds
- Molecules and Life: Historical Essays on the Interplay of Chemistry and Biology (1972)
- A Bio-bibliography for the History of the Biochemical Sciences since 1800 (1982, 1985, 1994)
- Contrasts in Scientific Style: Research Groups in the Chemical and Biochemical Sciences (1990)
- A Skeptical Biochemist (1992)
- Eighty Years (1994)
- Proteins, Enzymes, Genes: The Interplay of Chemistry and Biology (1999)
- Methods and Styles in the Development of Chemistry (2002)

== Awards and honors ==
In 1993, Fruton received the Dexter Award for Outstanding Achievement in the History of Chemistry from the American Chemical Society.
