= Derek George Smyth =

British biochemist (1927–2024)

Derek Smyth
- Born: 24 April 1927; Kingston Upon Thames, England
- Died: 28 October 2024 (aged 97); Enfield, England
- Scientific career
- Fields: Biochemistry
- Workplaces: Medical College of St Bartholomew's Hospital, Yale School of Medicine, Rockefeller University, National Institute for Medical Research Battersea Polytechnic, University of London

Derek George Smyth, FRSC (24 April 1927 – 28 October 2024) was a British biochemist who specialised in peptide structure and function. In 2002, he was admitted as a Fellow of the Royal Society of Chemistry.

== Life and career ==
Smyth started working at the National Institute for Medical Research in 1963. He was Head of the Laboratory of Peptide Chemistry in Mill Hill, London from 1972 to 1992. He had worked previously with Professor Joseph Fruton, Head of the Biochemistry Department at Yale University, where he gained experience in protein and peptide chemistry and in 1960 transferred to Rockefeller University in New York City where, in the laboratory of Stanford Moore and William Howard Stein, he reinvestigated and established the amino acid sequence of pancreatic ribonuclease.

His major contribution came from studies of β-lipotropin, now recognised as a component of the pro-opiomelanocortin locus.

After retiring from NIMR, Smyth continued his research at the Institute for Molecular Biology in Salzburg, in the Pharmacology Department of the University of Murcia and in the William Harvey Research Institute, University of London. For a number of years (1977–1982) he was invited formally to assist the Nobel Committee in their nomination of candidates for the Nobel Prize in Physiology or Medicine and in 1997 he was elected as an honorary member (Excmo) of the Royal Academy of Medicine and Surgery in Murcia.

Smyth died on 28 October 2024, at the age of 97.
