= Vincent du Vigneaud =

American biochemist and Nobel laureate (1901–1978)

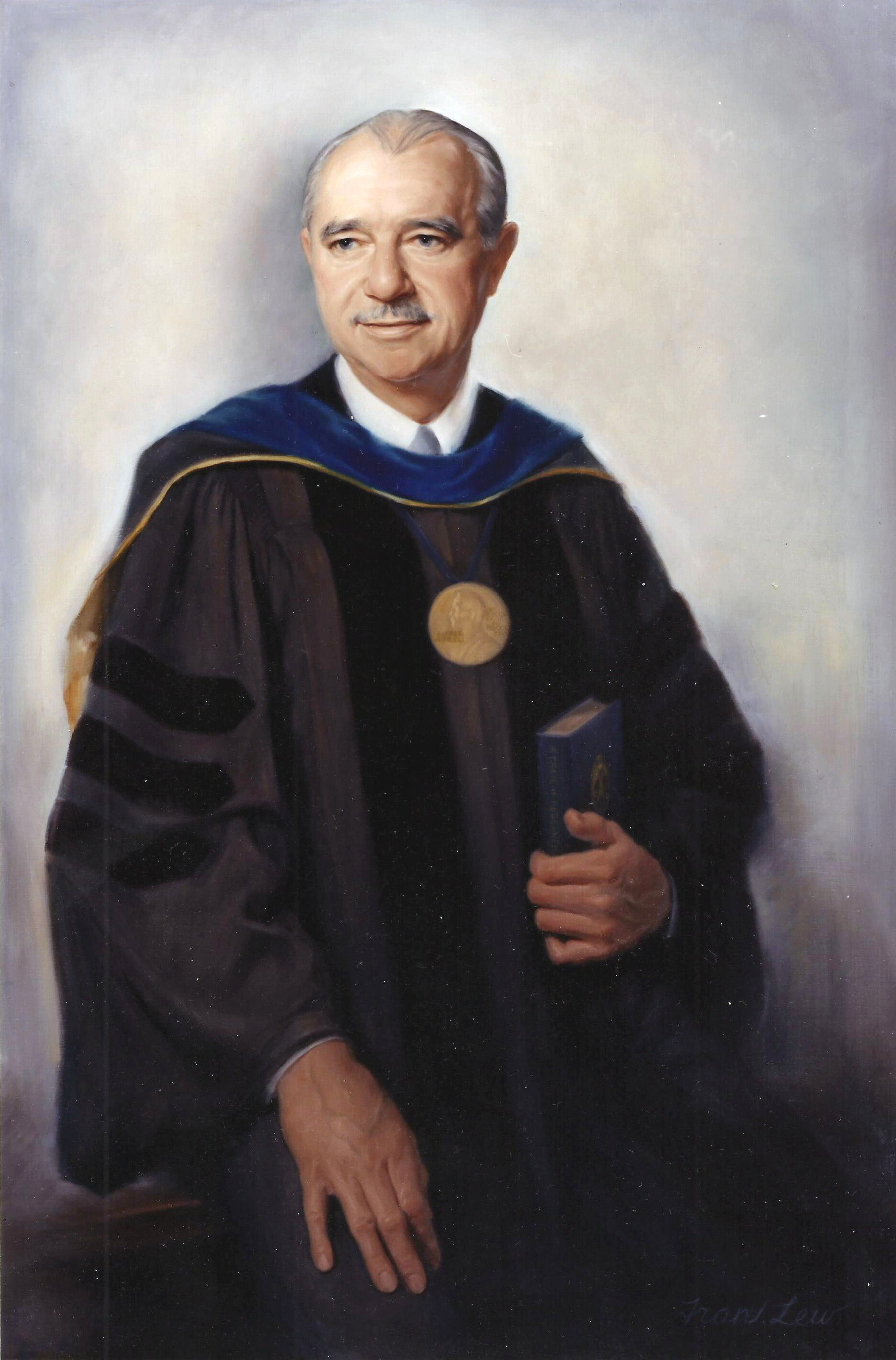
- du Vigneaud in 1955
- Born: May 18, 1901; Chicago, Illinois, United States
- Died: December 11, 1978 (aged 77); White Plains, New York, United States
- Education: University of Illinois Urbana-Champaign; University of Rochester
- Known for: synthesis of oxytocin and vasopressin
- Awards: William H. Nichols Medal (1945); Albert Lasker Award for Basic Medical Research (1948); Nobel Prize for Chemistry (1955); Willard Gibbs Award (1956)
- Scientific career
- Fields: Organic chemistry, Peptide synthesis
- Workplaces: University of Edinburgh; Johns Hopkins University; George Washington University; Cornell University
- Thesis: The Sulfur of Insulin (1927)
- Doctoral advisor: John R. Murlin
- Doctoral students: Sofia Simmonds

Vincent du Vigneaud (May 18, 1901 – December 11, 1978) was an American biochemist. He was recipient of the 1955 Nobel Prize in Chemistry "for his work on biochemically important sulphur compounds, especially for the first synthesis of a polypeptide hormone," a reference to his work on the peptide hormone oxytocin.

== Biography ==
Vincent du Vigneaud was born in Chicago in 1901. Of French descent, he was the son of inventor and mechanic Alfred du Vigneaud and Mary Theresa. He studied at the Schurz High School and completed secondary education in 1918. His interest in sulfur began when he entered high school and his new friends invited him to run chemical experiments on explosives using sulfur. During World War I, senior students were made to work on farms, and du Vigneaud worked near Caledonia, Illinois. There he became an expert in milking cows, which inspired him to become a farmer. However, his elder sister, Beatrice, persuaded him to take up chemistry at the University of Illinois at Urbana-Champaign, after which he enrolled in the chemical engineering course. He later recalled:

I found during the first year that it was chemistry rather than engineering that appealed to me most. I switched to a major in chemistry, since I was deeply impressed by the senior student's work, especially in organic chemistry. I also found that I was most interested in those aspects of organic chemistry that had to do with medical substances and began to develop an interest in biochemistry.

His interest was aroused by lectures of Carl Shipp Marvel and Howard B. Lewis, whom he remembered as being 'extremely enthusiastic about sulfur." With little support from the family, he found odd jobs to support himself. After receiving his MS in 1924 he joined DuPont.

He married Zella Zon Ford, whom he met on June 12, 1924, while working as a waiter during his university course. During the fall of 1924, Marvel found him a job as an assistant biochemist at the Philadelphia General Hospital that helped him to teach clinical chemistry at the Graduate School of Medicine, University of Pennsylvania. Marvel would pay for the trip to Pennsylvania in exchange for du Vigneaud's preparation of 10 pounds of cupferron. Resuming his academic career in 1925, du Vigneaud joined the group of John R. Murlin at the University of Rochester for his PhD thesis. He graduated in 1927 with his work The Sulfur of Insulin.

After a post-doctoral position with John Jacob Abel at Johns Hopkins University Medical School (1927–1928), he traveled to Europe as a National Research Council Fellow in 1928–1929, where he worked with Max Bergmann and Leonidas Zervas at the Kaiser Wilhelm Institute for Leather Research in Dresden, and with George Barger at the University of Edinburgh Medical School. He then returned to the University of Illinois as a professor.

In 1932, he started working at the George Washington University Medical School in Washington, D.C., and in 1938, he attended the Cornell Medical College in New York City, where he stayed until his emeritation in 1967. Following retirement, he held a position at Cornell University in Ithaca, New York.

In 1974, du Vigneaud had a stroke which forced his retirement. He died in 1978, one year after his wife's death in 1977.

== Scientific contributions ==
Du Vigneaud's career was characterized by an interest in sulfur-containing peptides, proteins, and especially peptide hormones. Even before his Nobel-Prize-winning work on elucidating and synthesizing oxytocin and vasopressin via manipulating the AVP gene, he had established a reputation from his research on insulin, biotin, transmethylation, and penicillin.

He also carried out a series of structure-activity relationships for oxytocin and vasopressin, perhaps the first of their type for peptides. That work culminated in the publication of a book entitled A Trail of Research in Sulphur Chemistry and Metabolism and Related Fields.

== Honours ==
Du Vigneaud joined Alpha Chi Sigma while at the University of Illinois in 1930. He was elected to the United States National Academy of Sciences and the American Philosophical Society in 1944, and the American Academy of Arts and Sciences in 1948. He received the 1955 Nobel Prize in Chemistry "for his work on biochemically important sulphur compounds, especially for the first synthesis of a polypeptide hormone," a reference to his work on the peptide hormone oxytocin.

== See also ==
- University of Rochester
- List of Nobel Laureates affiliated with the University of Rochester
