= Symmetry in Mechanics =

Undergraduate textbook on mathematics and mathematical physics

Symmetry in Mechanics: A Gentle, Modern Introduction
- Author: Stephanie Singer
- Genre: Mathematics
- Publisher: Birkhäuser
- Publication date: 2001
- Media type: Textbook

Symmetry in Mechanics: A Gentle, Modern Introduction is an undergraduate textbook on mathematics and mathematical physics, centered on the use of symplectic geometry to solve the Kepler problem. It was written by Stephanie Singer, and published by Birkhäuser in 2001.

== Topics ==
The Kepler problem in classical mechanics is a special case of the two-body problem in which two point masses interact by Newton's law of universal gravitation (or by any central force obeying an inverse-square law). The book starts and ends with this problem, the first time in an ad hoc manner that represents the problem using a system of twelve variables for the positions and momentum vectors of the two bodies, uses the conservation laws of physics to set up a system of differential equations obeyed by these variables, and solves these equations. The second time through, it describes the positions and variables of the two bodies as a single point in a 12-dimensional phase space, describes the behavior of the bodies as a Hamiltonian system, and uses symplectic reductions to shrink the phase space to two dimensions before solving it to produce Kepler's laws of planetary motion in a more direct and principled way.

The middle portion of the book sets up the machinery of symplectic geometry needed to complete this tour. Topics covered in this part include manifolds, vector fields and differential forms, pushforwards and pullbacks, symplectic manifolds, Hamiltonian energy functions, the representation of finite and infinitesimal physical symmetries using Lie groups and Lie algebras, and the use of the moment map to relate symmetries to conserved quantities. In these topics, as well, concrete examples are central to the presentation.

== Audience and reception ==
The book is written as a textbook for undergraduate mathematics and physics students, with many exercises, and it assumes that the students are already familiar with multivariable calculus and linear algebra, a significantly lower level of background material than other books on symplectic geometry in mechanics. It is not comprehensive in its coverage of symplectic geometry and mechanics, but could be used as auxiliary reading in a class that covers that material from other sources, such as Abraham and Marsden's Foundations of Mechanics or Arnold's Mathematical Methods of Classical Mechanics. Alternatively, on its own, it can provide a more accessible first course in this material, before presenting it more comprehensively in another course.

Reviewer William Satzer writes that this book "makes serious efforts to address real students and their potential difficulties" and shifts comfortably between mathematical and physical views of its problem. Similarly, reviewer J. R. Dorfman writes that it "removes some of the language barriers that divide the worlds of mathematics and physics", and reviewer Jiří Vanžura calls it "remarkable" in its dual ability to motivate mathematical methods for physics students and provide applications in physics for mathematics students, adding that "The book is perfectly written and serves very well its purpose." Reviewer Ivailo Mladenov notes with approval the book's attention to example-first exposition, and despite pointing to a minor inaccuracy regarding the nationality of Sophus Lie, recommends it to both undergraduate and graduate students. Reviewer Richard Montgomory writes that the book does "an excellent job of leading the reader from the Kepler problem to a view of the growing field of symplectic geometry".
