= Eschweiler–Clarke reaction =

Chemical reaction

Named after	Wilhelm Eschweiler; Hans Thacher Clarke
Reaction type	Substitution reaction

Identifiers
Organic Chemistry Portal	eschweiler-clarke-reaction
RSC ontology ID	RXNO:0000376

The Eschweiler–Clarke reaction (also called the Eschweiler–Clarke methylation) is a chemical reaction whereby a primary (or secondary) amine is methylated using excess formic acid and formaldehyde. Reductive amination reactions such as this one will not produce quaternary ammonium salts, but instead will stop at the tertiary amine stage. It is named for the German chemist Wilhelm Eschweiler (1860–1936) and the British chemist Hans Thacher Clarke (1887–1972).

The Eschweiler–Clark reaction

== Mechanism ==
The reaction is generally performed in an aqueous solution at close to boiling. The first methylation of the amine begins with imine formation with formaldehyde. The formic acid acts as a source of hydride and reduces the imine to a secondary amine. Loss of carbon dioxide gas renders the reaction irreversible. Despite being more hindered, the formation of the tertiary amine is more favorable, as the intermediate in iminium ion is formed without needing to protonate. Hence the treatment of a primary amine with less than 2 equivalents of formaldehyde will give more tertiary than secondary amine, along with unreacted starting material.

The mechanism of the Eschweiler–Clark reaction

From this mechanism it is clear that a quaternary ammonium salt will never form, because it is impossible for a tertiary amine to form another imine or iminium ion.

Chiral amines typically do not racemize under these conditions.

Altered versions of this reaction replace formic acid with sodium cyanoborohydride.

== See also ==
- Leuckart–Wallach reaction
- Pictet–Spengler reaction
