= Maxine Singer =

American biologist (1931–2024)

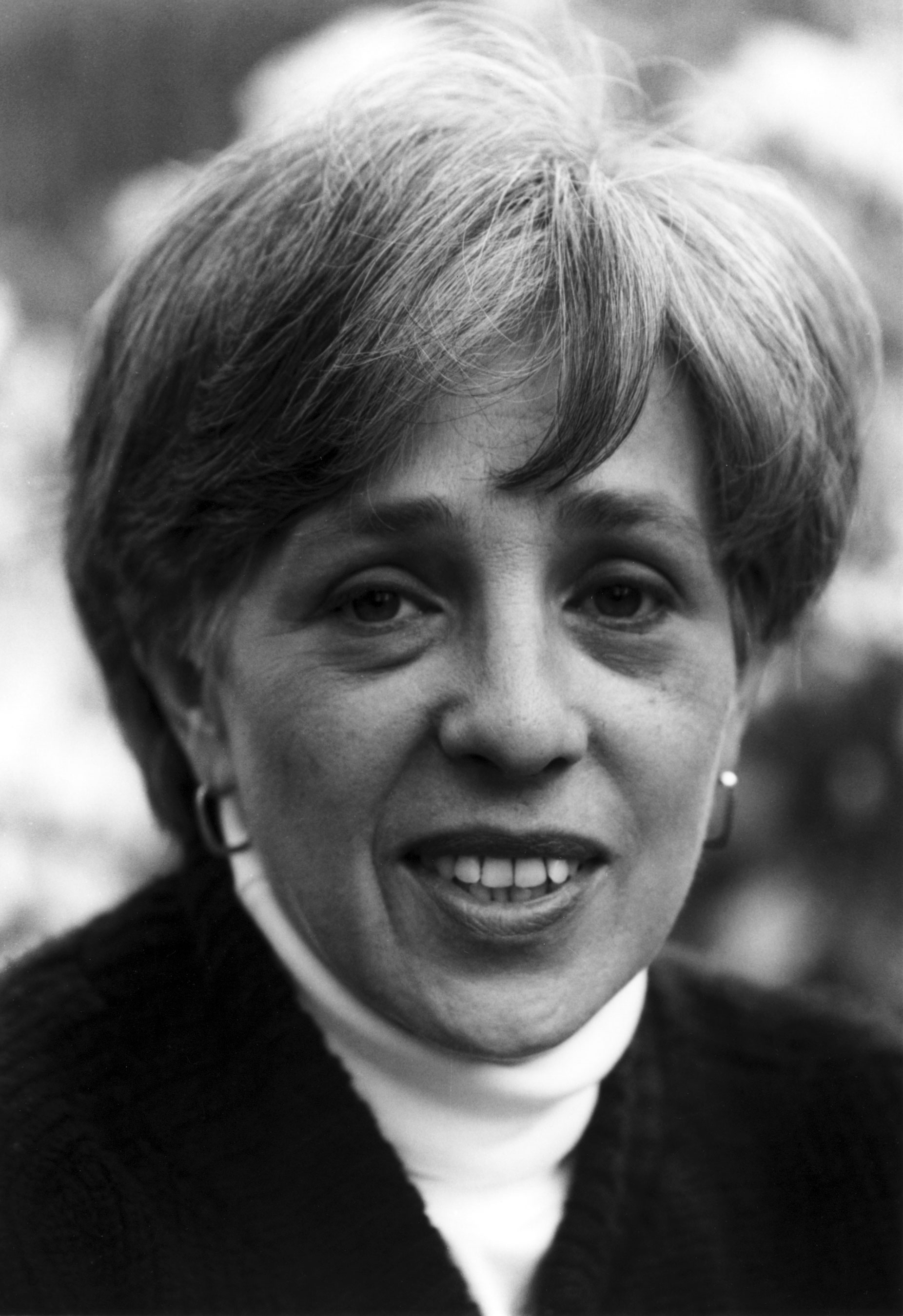
- Born: Maxine Frank; February 15, 1931; New York City, New York, U.S.
- Died: July 9, 2024 (aged 93); Washington, D.C., U.S.
- Education: Swarthmore College (BA); Yale University (PhD)
- Known for: Recombinant DNA techniques
- Spouse: Daniel Singer (m. 1952)
- Children: 4, including Amy and Stephanie
- Awards: AAAS Award for Scientific Freedom and Responsibility (1982); National Medal of Science (1992); Vannevar Bush Award (1999); Public Welfare Medal (2007); ASCB Public Service Award (2008)
- Scientific career
- Fields: Molecular Biology Biochemistry
- Doctoral advisor: Joseph Fruton

Maxine Frank Singer (née Frank; February 15, 1931 – July 9, 2024) was an American molecular biologist and science administrator. She was known for her contributions to solving the genetic code, her role in the ethical and regulatory debates on recombinant DNA techniques (including the organization of the Asilomar Conference on Recombinant DNA), and her leadership of Carnegie Institution of Washington.

In 2002, Discover magazine recognized her as one of the 50 most important women in science.

== Early life and education ==
Maxine Frank was born in New York City to Henrietta and Hyman Frank. Her father was a lawyer, and her mother a homemaker.

After attending Midwood High School in Brooklyn, she majored in chemistry and minored in biology at Swarthmore College. She went on to earn a PhD in 1957 at Yale University, researching protein chemistry under Joseph Fruton.

== Career ==
After graduating, Fruton encouraged her to specialize in nucleic acids, and in 1956 she joined the Laboratory of Biochemistry of Leon A. Heppel at the National Institutes of Health. She led various biochemical research groups as the Chief of the Laboratory of Biochemistry at the National Cancer institute between 1980 and 1987.

In the wake of the 1973 report of the first use of recombinant DNA techniques to introduce genes from one species into another, Singer was among the first to call attention to the possible risks of genetic engineering. She was a chairperson of the 1973 Gordon Conference on Nucleic Acids, where the possible public health risks of the technique were discussed, and she helped to organize the 1975 Asilomar Conference on Recombinant DNA that resulted in guidelines for dealing with the largely unknown risks of the technique.

Singer was elected a Fellow of the American Academy of Arts and Sciences in 1978. In 1988, she became president of the Carnegie Institution of Washington, a position she held until 2002. She was elected to the American Philosophical Society in 1990. Singer received the National Medal of Science in 1992 "for her outstanding scientific accomplishments and her deep concern for the societal responsibility of the scientist" and was the first woman to receive the Vannevar Bush Award, in 1999. In 2007, she was awarded the Public Welfare Medal from the National Academy of Sciences. In 2010, she was awarded the Viktor Hamburger Outstanding Educator Prize from the Society for Developmental Biology.

=== Research contributions ===
Singer made important contributions to the fields of biochemistry and molecular biology. Her research with Leon Heppel on the role of enzymes that regulate synthesis of nucleic acids played a part in helping Marshall Nirenberg and Heinrick Matthaei to decipher the genetic code. They studied polynucleotide phosphorylase, an enzyme that can join individual nucleotides into random RNA sequences. They investigated the base compositions of these polynucleotides using electrophoresis and paper chromatography, which enabled them to understand how the enzyme catalyzed their synthesis. These experiments allowed them to create a library of artificial RNA strands with defined sequences, such as a molecule made of only triplets of uracil that would code for phenylalanine. These artificial polynucleotides were used by Nirenberg to support the hypothesis that RNA plays a key role in the synthesis of proteins using information from DNA. The RNA sequences that Singer produced were used to match each of the twenty amino acids to a different RNA nucleotide triplet.

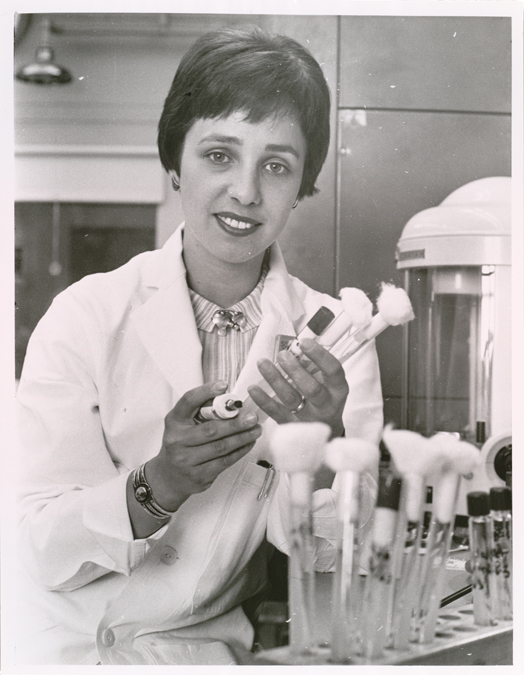
Singer in 1956

Singer's research included the study of chromatin structure and genetic recombination of viruses. During her time as the head of the Laboratory of Biochemistry at the National Cancer Institute in the 1980s, her research focused on LINEs, or long interspersed nucleotide elements. She focused on LINE-1, a retrotransposon found in mammalian genomes that is scattered in thousands of places in the human genome, which she concluded is capable of movement and insertion into new places in the chromosomal DNA. She studied the mechanism of how LINE-1 replicates and disperses copies to new locations in the genome, and found that the insertion of these elements could induce mutations in nearby genes, playing a role in genetic disease.

=== Contributions to scientific community ===
Besides her scientific research, Singer was influential in refining science policy. When she was the co-chair of the Gordon Conference in 1973, she raised concerns over the potential health effects and risks in the relatively new field of recombinant DNA technology. She organized the 1975 Asilomar conference in order to bring together scientists to impose restrictions and draw guidelines on recombinant DNA research, where she recommended resumption of research under cautious safeguards until more was known about the potential biohazards of recombinant DNA technology.

Singer was also an advocate for women and inclusivity in science. She wrote an editorial in Science arguing that universities should encourage women pursuing science and engineering rather than wasting their skills due to unintentional bias against them. Singer also introduced the "First Light" project, a science education program for elementary school students in Washington, D.C. aiming to improve mathematics and science education in schools.

Singer wrote over 100 scientific papers, and also published several books with co-author Paul Berg intended to help the public have a better understanding of molecular genetics, including Genes and Genomes (1991), Dealing with Genes (1993), and George Beadle: An Uncommon Farmer (2003). In 2018 she published Blossoms: And the Genes that Make Them, which describes the genetic and evolutionary reasons that flowers bloom.

== Personal life ==
Maxine married Daniel Singer, a Swarthmore classmate and political science major, in 1952. They had four children: Ellen, Amy, David, and Stephanie.

Singer died from chronic obstructive pulmonary disease and emphysema at her home in Washington, D.C., on July 9, 2024, at the age of 93.
