= Stephanie Singer =

American mathematician and politician

Stephanie Frank Singer (born 1964) is an American mathematician and politician in Philadelphia, Pennsylvania. Singer was a professor at Haverford College from 1991 to 2002 before founding Campaign Scientific, a computer data business for political organizations. She was elected as a Philadelphia City Commissioner in November 2011.

== Early life and education ==
Singer was born in 1964 to Maxine and Daniel Singer. Her mother was a molecular biologist and her father was an attorney for Fried, Frank, Harris, Shriver & Jacobson.

Singer graduated from Yale University and earned a Ph.D. in 1991 at New York University. She spent a year in graduate studies at Stanford University for computer science.

== Career ==
=== Academic ===
Singer was a professor at Haverford College from 1991 to 2002, where she earned tenure. She experienced sexual harassment while at the school, which she discussed in a 2017 article in The Chronicle of Higher Education.

She founded Campaign Scientific, which provided data services to political organizations and businesses. In 2002, she began requesting data from the Office of the Philadelphia Commissioners, which is responsible for conducting elections in the city, to post the data on an unofficial website for the city's Democratic party. The commission would only provide data in paper form until Singer threatened to sue them in 2008.

=== Politics ===
Singer became increasingly active in politics after volunteering to work on election data for the 2004 presidential campaign of John Kerry. In 2008, she was elected Democratic Party committeeperson for Philadelphia's 8th Ward, an influential position representing Center City.

In 2011, she was elected as a Philadelphia City Commissioner, defeating 36-year incumbent Marge Tartaglione. She ran an aggressive campaign, describing her opponent as "an embarrassment". Her campaign was endorsed by the Philadelphia Daily News and John Dougherty and his IBEW Local 98. She was sworn into office on January 3, 2012. During her time in office, she clashed with the other commissioners, Republican Al Schmidt and Democrat Anthony Clark, as well as the chair of the Philadelphia Democratic Party, U.S. Representative Bob Brady. The day after the city's handling of the November 6, 2012 elections led to criticism of the commission, Schmidt and Clark voted to remove Singer as chair of the commissioner and appoint themselves as co-chairs. The Philadelphia Inquirer reported that the removal did not appear related to the election, however, and noted that the commissioners "had been bickering for months at their weekly public sessions over seemingly small issues" as well as Singer's vocal opposition to the state's new voter ID law. Prior to their election, Singer and Schmidt had both run as progressive reformers, and Schmidt had initially voted with Singer to appoint her chair.

Singer's reelection attempt in 2015 was challenged by three Democratic voters for failing to obtain the required 1,000 signatures on nomination petitions, falling four short. In March 2015, Common Pleas Court Judge Joel Johnson removed her from the Democratic primary ballot. Her term as city commissioner ended in 2016.

In October 2018, Singer launched a podcast entitled Defend Democracy! where she reflects on her experience as a former election official, data strategist, and successful candidate, with advice to those who have interests in entering politics.

== Personal life ==
She is the daughter of molecular biologist and science administrator Maxine Singer and the sister of historian Amy Singer.

Singer married Stephen Fischer in 1993 in a ceremony officiated by Ruth Bader Ginsburg, then a judge for the United States Court of Appeals for the District of Columbia Circuit.

== Bibliography ==
Author

- Linearity, Symmetry, and Prediction in the Hydrogen Atom (Springer, Undergraduate Texts in Mathematics 115, 2005)
- Symmetry in Mechanics: A Gentle, Modern Introduction (Birkhauser Boston, 2001).

Translator

- Yvette Kosmann-Schwarzbach, Groups and Symmetries: From Finite Groups to Lie Groups (Springer, 2010).
