= Asilomar Conference on Recombinant DNA =

Influential 1975 academic meeting held in California

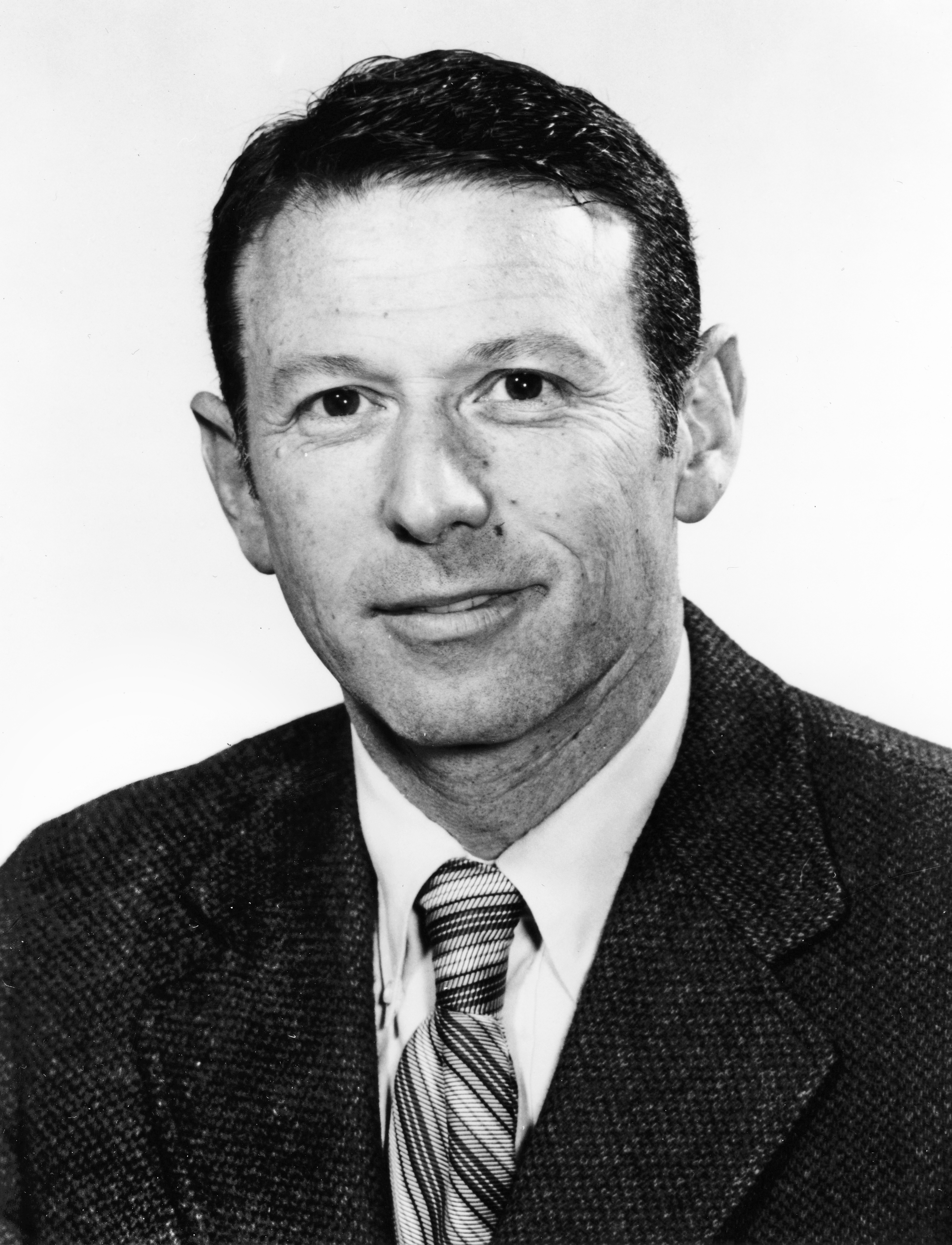
Paul Berg, a leading researcher in the field of recombinant DNA technology, who subsequently shared the 1980 Nobel Prize in Chemistry with Walter Gilbert and Frederick Sanger, helped organize the 1975 conference.

The Asilomar Conference on Recombinant DNA was an influential conference organized by Paul Berg, Maxine Singer, and colleagues to discuss the potential biohazards and regulation of biotechnology, held in February 1975 at a conference center at Asilomar State Beach, California. A group of about 140 professionals (primarily biologists, but also including lawyers and physicians) participated in the conference to draw up voluntary guidelines to ensure the safety of recombinant DNA technology. The conference also placed scientific research more into the public domain, and can be seen as applying a version of the precautionary principle.

The effects of these guidelines are still being felt through the biotechnology industry and the participation of the general public in scientific discourse. Due to potential safety hazards, scientists worldwide had halted experiments using recombinant DNA technology, which entailed combining DNAs from different organisms. After the establishment of the guidelines during the conference, scientists continued with their research, which increased fundamental knowledge about biology and the public's interest in biomedical research.

== Background ==
Recombinant DNA technology arose as a result of advances in biology that began in the 1950s and '60s. During these decades, a tradition of merging the structural, biochemical, and informational approaches to the central problems of classical genetics became more apparent. Two main underlying concepts of this tradition were that genes consisted of DNA and that DNA encoded information that determined the processes of replication and protein synthesis. These concepts were embodied in the model of DNA produced through the combined efforts of James Watson, Francis Crick, Rosalind Franklin, and Maurice Wilkins. Further research on the Watson-Crick model yielded theoretical advances that were reflected in new capacities to manipulate DNA. One of these capacities was recombinant DNA technology.

=== Experimental design ===
This technology entails the joining of DNA from different species and the subsequent insertion of the hybrid DNA into a host cell. One of the first individuals to develop recombinant DNA technology was a biochemist at Stanford by the name of Paul Berg. In his experimental design in 1974, he cleaved (cut into fragments) the monkey virus SV40. He then cleaved the double helix of another virus, an antibacterial agent known as bacteriophage lambda. In the third step, he fastened DNA from the SV40 to DNA from the bacteriophage lambda. The final step involved placing the mutant genetic material into a laboratory strain of the E. coli bacterium. This last step, however, was not completed in the original experiment.

=== Initial bio-safety concerns ===
Berg did not complete his final step due to the pleas of several fellow investigators, including Robert Pollack, who feared the biohazards associated with the last step. The SV40 was known to cause cancer tumors to develop in mice. Additionally, the E. coli bacterium (although not the strain used by Berg) inhabited the human intestinal tract. For these reasons, the other investigators feared that the final step would create cloned SV40 DNA that might escape into the environment and infect laboratory workers. These workers could then become cancer victims.

Concern about this potential biohazard, along with others, caused a group of leading researchers to send a letter to the president of the National Academy of Sciences (NAS). In this letter, they requested that he appoint an ad hoc committee to study the bio-safety ramifications of this new technology. This committee, called the Committee on Recombinant DNA molecules of the National Academy of Science, U.S.A., held in 1974, concluded that an international conference was necessary to resolve the issue and that until that time, scientists should halt experiments involving recombinant DNA technology.

== Asilomar Conference ==
=== Court: Established principles ===
The Asilomar Conference on Recombinant DNA took place at the Asilomar Conference Center on California's Monterey Peninsula in 1975. The main goal of the conference was to address the biohazards presented by recombinant DNA technology. During the conference, the principles guiding the recommendations for how to conduct experiments using this technology safely were established. The first for dealing with potential risks was that containment should be made an essential consideration in the experimental design. A second principle was that the effectiveness of the containment should match the estimated risk as closely as possible.

The conference also suggested the use of biological barriers to limit the spread of recombinant DNA. Such biological barriers included fastidious bacterial hosts that were unable to survive in natural environments. Other barriers were nontransmissible and equally fastidious vectors (plasmids, bacteriophages, or other viruses) that were able to grow in only specified hosts.

In addition to biological barriers, the conference advocated the use of additional safety factors. One such factor was physical containment, exemplified by the use of hoods or, where applicable, limited access or negative pressure laboratories. Another factor was the strict adherence to good microbiological practices, which would limit the escape of organisms from the experimental situation. Additionally, the education and training of all personnel involved in the experiments would be essential to effective containment measures.

=== Recommendations given ===
The Asilomar Conference also gave recommendations for matching the types of containment necessary for different types of experiments. These recommendations were based on the different levels of risk associated with the experiment, which would require different levels of containment. These levels were minimal, low, moderate, and high risk. The minimal risk level of containment was intended for experiments in which the biohazards could be accurately assessed and were expected to be minimal. Low-risk containment was appropriate for experiments that generated novel biotypes but where the available information indicated that the recombinant DNA could not either alter the ecological behavior of the recipient species, increase its pathogenicity significantly, or prevent effective treatments of any resulting infections. The moderate risk level of containment was intended for experiments in which there was a probability of generating an agent with a significant potential for pathogenicity or ecological disruption. High-risk containment was intended for experiments in which the potential for ecological disruption or pathogenicity of the modified organism could be severe and thereby pose a serious biohazard to laboratory personnel or to the public. These levels of containment, along with the previously mentioned safety measures, formed the basis for the guidelines used by investigators in future experiments that involved the construction and propagation of recombinant DNA molecules using DNA from prokaryotes, bacteriophages, and other plasmids, animal viruses, and eukaryotes.

=== Recommendations applied to experiments ===
For prokaryotes, bacteriophages, and other plasmids, experiments could be performed in minimal risk containment facilities when the construction of recombinant DNA molecules and their propagation involved prokaryotic agents that were known to exchange genetic information naturally. For experiments involving the creation and propagation of recombinant DNA molecules from DNAs of species that ordinarily do not exchange genetic information and generate novel biotypes, the experiments were to be performed in at least a low-risk containment facility. If the experiment increased the pathogenicity of the recipient species or resulted in new metabolic pathways in the species, then moderate or high-risk containment facilities were to be used. In experiments where the range of resistance of established human pathogens to therapeutically useful antibiotics or disinfectants was extended, the experiments were to be undertaken only in moderate or high-risk containment facilities.

When working with animal viruses, experiments that involved the linkage of viral genomes or genome segments to prokaryotic vectors and their propagation in prokaryotic cells were to be conducted only with vector-host systems that had demonstrated restricted growth capabilities outside the laboratory and in moderate risk containment facilities. As safer vector-host systems became available, such experiments could be performed in low-risk facilities. In experiments designed to introduce or propagate DNA from non-viral or other low-risk agents in animal cells, only low-risk animal DNA could be used as vectors, and the manipulations were to be confined to moderate risk containment facilities.

With eukaryotes, attempts to clone segments of DNA using recombinant DNA technology from warm-blooded vertebrates' genomes were to be performed only with vector-host systems that had demonstrably restricted growth capabilities outside the laboratory and in a moderate risk containment facility. This was because they potentially contained cryptic viral genomes that were potentially pathogenic to humans. However, unless the organism made a dangerous product, recombinant DNAs from cold-blooded vertebrates and all other lower eukaryotes could be constructed and propagated with the safest vector-host system available in low-risk containment facilities. Additionally, purified DNA from any source that performed known functions and was judged to be non-toxic could be cloned with available vectors in low-risk containment facilities.

=== Prohibited experiments ===
In addition to regulating the experiments that were conducted, the guidelines also forbade the performance of other experiments. One such experiment was the cloning of recombinant DNAs derived from highly pathogenic organisms. In addition, neither the cloning of DNA containing toxin genes nor large-scale experiments using recombinant DNAs that were able to make products that were potentially harmful to humans, animals, or plants were allowed under the guidelines. These experiments were banned because the potential biohazards could not be contained by the then-current safety precautions.

=== Science and the general public ===
The participants of the Asilomar Conference also endeavored to bring science into the domain of the general public, with a possible motivation being the Watergate scandal. That scandal resulted from a bungled break-in at the Watergate hotel in Washington, D.C., which served as the Democratic National Committee headquarters in 1972. Two years after the burglary, taped evidence was discovered that indicated that U.S. President Nixon had discussed a cover-up a week after it. Three days following the release of the tape, Nixon resigned from his presidential office. This event focused the nation's attention on the problem of government secrecy fostering illegal and immoral behavior, and it has been suggested by the political scientist Ira H. Carmen that this motivated the scientists at the Asilomar Conference to bring science into the public eye to ensure that they would not be accused of a cover-up. Additionally, according to Dr. Berg and Dr. Singer, by being forthright, scientists avoided restrictive legislation due to the development of a consensus on how they were to conduct their research.

Bringing science into the public eye also coincided with the rapid rate at which recombinant DNA technology entered the industrial world. Because of the practical applications of the technology, funding for research using it started coming more from the private sector and less from the public sector. In addition, many molecular biologists who once confined themselves to academia developed ties with private industry as equity owners, corporate executives, and consultants. This led to the creation of a biotechnology industry, although during this time, public debates occurred over the hazards of recombinant DNA. These debates were eventually won over by scientists who stated that the hazards were exaggerated and that the research could be conducted safely. Such was seen in the Ascot report, found in the U.S. Federal Register in March 1978. This report emphasized that the hazards of recombinant DNA to the general community were small to the point that they were of no practical consequence to the general public. For this reason, along with high economic pressures for industrial development and a more supportive political environment that existed after 1979, research and industry based on recombinant DNA continued to expand.

== Significance of the conference ==
Years after the conference, people ascribed a large amount of significance to it. According to Paul Berg and Maxine Singer in 1995, the conference marked the beginning of an exceptional era for both science and the public discussion of science policy. The guidelines devised by the conference enabled scientists to conduct experiments with recombinant DNA technology, which by 1995 dominated biological research. This research, in turn, increased knowledge about fundamental life processes, such as the cell cycle. Additionally, the conference, along with public debates on recombinant DNA, increased public interest in biomedical research and molecular genetics. For this reason, by 1995, genetics and its vocabulary had become a part of the daily press and television news. This, in turn, stimulated knowledgeable public discussion about some of the social, political, and environmental issues that emerged from genetic medicine and the use of genetically modified plants in agriculture. Another significant outcome of the conference was the precedent it set about how to respond to changes in scientific knowledge. According to the conference, the proper response to new scientific knowledge was to develop guidelines that governed how to regulate it.

== See also ==
- Genetically modified organism
- History of biotechnology
