= Mary Ellen Jones (chemist) =

American biochemist

- Born: December 25, 1922; La Grange Park, Illinois
- Died: August 23, 1996 (aged 73); Waltham, Massachusetts
- Education: University of Chicago; Yale University
- Known for: Discovery of carbomoyl phosphate
- Scientific career
- Fields: Biochemistry
- Workplaces: Brandeis University; University of North Carolina at Chapel Hill; University of Southern California
- Doctoral advisor: Joseph Fruton

Mary Ellen Jones (December 25, 1922 – August 23, 1996) was an American biochemist. She was notable for discovery of carbamoyl phosphate, a chemical substance that is key to the biosynthesis of arginine and urea, and for the biosynthesis of pyrimidine nucleotides. Jones became the first woman to hold a chair at the University of North Carolina at Chapel Hill, and the first woman to become a department chair at the medical school. She was a member of the National Academy of Sciences. She was also president of the Association of Medical School Departments of Biochemistry, president of the American Society for Biochemistry and Molecular Biology, and president of the American Association of University Professors. The New York Times called her a "crucial researcher on DNA" and said that her studies laid the foundation for basic cancer research. She died of cancer on August 23, 1996.

== Early life ==
Jones was born in La Grange Park, Illinois, on December 12, 1922. Her parents were Elmer and Laura Klein Jones.

== Education ==
Jones pursued her bachelor's degree in biochemistry at the University of Chicago. While an undergraduate, she began to work part-time for Armour and Company. Upon her graduation in 1944, having paucity of funds to pursue graduate school, she continued to work for Armour, where she collaborated with Paul Munson, the director of the research laboratory. Their research led to Munson and Jones publishing two papers on androsterone and monopalmitin in the Journal of Biological Chemistry.

After marrying Munson in 1948, Jones moved to Yale University to pursue her Ph.D. in biochemistry, while Munson became an assistant professor in pharmacology. Under the direction of Joseph S. Fruton, Jones' dissertation research involved the catalytic properties of cathepsin C, a type of protease. Her doctorate was entitled: Transamidation reactions catalyzed by cathepsin C. Jones completed her studies in three years receiving her doctorate in 1951.

Upon receiving her Ph.D., Jones moved to Boston, where she did a postdoctoral fellowship with Fritz Lipmann in the Chemical Research Laboratory at Massachusetts General Hospital. When the Department of Biochemistry was established at Brandeis University was established in 1957, she joined the faculty as an assistant professor, and was later promoted to associate professor.

In 1966, Jones joined the University of North Carolina at Chapel Hill as an associate professor in the Department of Biochemistry, and in 1968 was appointed professor in the Department of Zoology. She left UNC Chapel Hill in 1971 for the University of Southern California and was a professor of biochemistry there until 1978. She then returned to the University of North Carolina as a professor and chair of Department of Biochemistry and was named a Kenan Professor in 1980. Jones was the first female scientist to hold an endowed chair at the University of North Carolina and the first woman to become a department chair at the medical school. She resigned as chairwoman in 1989, but remained active in research and teaching until early in 1995.

== Academic work ==
Although Jones had started out as a bacteriologist at Armour, she eventually found her passion to be research chemistry and enzymology. She pursued these interests by studying androsterone and monopalmitin at Armour, and cathepsin C at Yale.

Jones worked as postdoctoral fellow under Fritz Lipmann at Massachusetts General Hospital from 1951 to 1957. During this time, in 1953, Lipmann was awarded the Nobel prize in Physiology or Medicine. Her work with Lipmann and Leonard Spector included the novel demonstration of ATP being involved in a reaction to activate Coenzyme A and produce pyrophosphate, and the discovery of carbamoyl phosphate, a key component of nucleotides which are essential to energy transfer within cells.

By the time Jones joined Brandeis as a faculty member, she had published 13 papers: two from when she was a technician at Armour, two more from her graduate work at Yale, plus another nine papers from her work in the Lipmann laboratory. She continued her prolific work at Brandeis while collaborating with Leonard Spector. The two continued to work on carbamoyl phosphate, identifying carbon dioxide or bicarbonate as the source for the initial activation step for carbamoyl phosphate formation. Jones also suspected that there were two separate carbamoyl-phosphate synthetase isozymes. In 1966, fellow chemist Sally E. Hager and Jones published their work identifying a key enzyme that required glutamine for the synthesis of orotate. Jones and Hager were able to find a way to stabilize the enzyme so that it could be studied further.

In addition to studying amino acid metabolism, Jones was also active in studying pyrimidine nucleotide metabolism. She was one of the first researchers to study multi-functional proteins, including working with the enzymes dihydroorotate synthase and uridine monophosphate synthase.

When Jones moved to University of North Carolina at Chapel Hill in 1966 as an associate professor, space in the biochemistry department was limited. She had to make do with room the basement of the zoology department.

In 1997, Mary Ellen Jones was recognized for her many contributions to UNC as a "scientist, humanist, and warrior in the struggle for gender equality in science" when the university chose to name a building after her. "Mary Ellen was a paragon whose personal and scientific leadership shaped much of the basic research education at this institution," according to Dr. Stuart Bondurant.

Overall, her research into DNA, RNA, and mechanisms of metabolic pathways helped people to understand how cells divide and differentiate, which in turn helped researchers to understand the action of cancer cells.

== Personal life ==
Mary Ellen Jones married Paul Munson in 1948 and divorced in 1971. They had two children: Ethan V. Munson (born 1956), currently an associate professor of computer science at the University of Wisconsin-Milwaukee, and Catherine Munson (born 1960), currently a psychiatrist in Charlotte, North Carolina. She retired in 1995, soon after being diagnosed with esophageal cancer. She died in Waltham, Massachusetts, on August 23, 1996.

== Notable awards and distinctions ==
- the Wilbur Lucius Cross Medal from Yale University (1982)
- president of the Association of Medical School Departments of Biochemistry (1985)
- president of the American Society for Biochemistry and Molecular Biology (1986)
- the North Carolina American Chemical Society Distinguished Chemist (1986)
- president of the American Association of University Professors (1988)
- the Thomas Jefferson Award from the University of North Carolina (1990)
- the Award in Science awarded by the state of North Carolina (1991)
- elected to the Institute of Medicine (1981)
- elected to the National Academy of Sciences (1984)
- elected to the American Academy of Arts and Sciences (1991)
- elected to the American Philosophical Society (1994)
- an 11-story research center dedicated with her name at the University of North Carolina at Chapel Hill
