= Amy Singer (historian) =

Scholar in the history of the Ottoman period

Academic background
- Education: Swarthmore College (BA); Princeton University (PhD)

Academic work
- Discipline: History
- Institutions: Tel Aviv University; Brandeis University
- Notable works: Palestinian Peasants and Ottoman Officials: Rural Administration around Sixteenth-century Jerusalem (1994)

Amy Singer is an American historian. She is a Professor of Ottoman and Islamic History at Brandeis University. Her major research areas are agrarian relations, philanthropy, and the city of Edirne.

== Education ==
Singer earned her BA at Swarthmore College (1982). She completed a PhD in Near Eastern Studies at Princeton University in 1989.

== Career ==
In 1989, she was appointed as a lecturer in the Department of Middle Eastern and African History at Tel Aviv University. In 2007 she was promoted to professor. Singer served as head of the Women's Studies Forum at Tel Aviv University.

In 2018, she was appointed to the department of history and the Sylvia K. Hassenfeld Chair in Islamic and Middle Eastern Studies at Brandeis University.

She has held a number of research grants and fellowships including from the Israel Academy of Sciences and Humanities, the Institute for Advanced Study (Princeton) (2014–15), and a visiting fellowship at All Souls College, Oxford (2018–19). Singer has also held visiting professorships at the Boğaziçi University (2011) and Bologna University (2010).

Singer is on the editorial board of Mediterranean Historical Review, the Journal on Muslim Philanthropy and Civil Society and Turcica and is president of the Ottoman and Turkish Studies Association. She established OpenOttoman, a digital platform for Ottoman studies.

== Awards and recognition ==
In 2010, she received the Association for Research on Nonprofit Organizations and Voluntary Action (ARNOVA) Book Prize for the Outstanding Book in Non-profit and Voluntary Action Research, for Charity in Islamic Societies. In 2008, she received the Sakıp Sabancı International Research Award 2008, First Prize, for the article: “The Persistence of Philanthropy”.

She is the daughter of molecular biologist and science administrator Maxine Singer and the sister of mathematician and politician Stephanie Singer.

== Selected publications ==
=== Books ===
- A. Singer.1994. Palestinian Peasants and Ottoman Officials: Rural Administration around Sixteenth-century Jerusalem. Cambridge: Cambridge University Press. Turkish translation: Kadılar, Kullar, Kudüslü Köylüler. İstanbul: Tarih Vakfı Yurt Yayınları, 1996. Turkish translation republished: Kadılar, Kullar, Kudüslü Köylüler. Istanbul: Türkiye İş Bankası Kültür Yayınları, 2008.
- A. Singer 2002. Constructing Ottoman Beneficence: An Imperial Soup Kitchen in Jerusalem. Albany: State University of New York Press. Turkish translation: Osmanlı'da Hayirseverlik: Kudüs’te bir Haseki Sultan İmareti. İstanbul: Tarih Vakfı Yurt Yayınları, 2004
- A. Singer. 2008. Charity in Islamic Societies. Cambridge: Cambridge University Press. Turkish translation: İyilik Yap, Denize At: Musulman Toplumlarda Hayırseverlik (Istanbul: Kitap Yayınevi, 2012).

=== Edited volumes ===
- A. Singer with Michael Bonner and Mine Ener, eds. 2003. Poverty and Charity in Middle Eastern Contexts. Albany: State University of New York Press.
- A. Singer with Nina Ergin and Christoph K. Neumann, eds. 2007. Feeding People, Feeding Power: Imarets in the Ottoman Empire. Istanbul: Eren Yayıncılık.
- A. Singer. 2011. Starting with Food: Culinary Approaches to Ottoman History. Princeton: Markus Wiener Publishers. Published simultaneously under the same title as a special issue of Princeton Papers. Interdisciplinary Journal of Middle Eastern Studies 16 (2011). Turkish translation: Haydi Sofraya! Mutfak Penceresinden Osmanlı Tarihi. Istanbul: Kitap Yayınevi, 2015.

=== Articles ===
- A. Singer 2005. Serving up charity: The Ottoman public kitchen. Journal of Interdisciplinary History 35.3: 481-500.
- A. Singer 2006. Soup and sadaqa: Charity in Islamic societies. Historical Research 79.205: 306-324.
- A. Singer 2011. The Persistence of Philanthropy. Comparative Studies of South Asia, Africa and the Middle East, 31:3: 557-568.
- A. Singer 2016. Making Jerusalem Ottoman. In Living in the Ottoman Realm: Sultans, Subjects and Elites, eds. Christine Isom-Verhaaren and Kent F. Schull. Indianapolis: Indiana University Press, pp. 123–136.
- A. Singer 2016. Enter, Riding on an Elephant: One Approach to Early Ottoman Edirne. Journal of the Ottoman and Turkish Studies Association, 3:1: 89 -109.
- A. Singer, 2016. Introducing the Ottoman Gazetteer and OpenOttoman. Journal of the Ottoman and Turkish Studies Association 3(2): 407-412.
