= William Howard Stein =

American biochemist (1911–1980)

- Born: June 25, 1911; New York City, New York, USA
- Died: February 2, 1980 (aged 68); New York City, New York, USA
- Education: Harvard University; Columbia University
- Spouse(s): Phoebe Hockstader (1936–1980; his death; 3 children) (1913–1989)
- Awards: Nobel Prize in Chemistry (1972)
- Scientific career
- Fields: Biochemistry
- Workplaces: Rockefeller University, University of Chicago
- Thesis: The Composition of Elastin (1938)
- Doctoral advisor: Hans Thacher Clarke

William Howard Stein (June 25, 1911 – February 2, 1980) was an American biochemist who collaborated in the determination of the ribonuclease sequence, as well as how its structure relates to catalytic activity, earning a Nobel Prize in Chemistry in 1972 for his work. Stein was also involved in the invention of the automatic amino acid analyzer, an advancement in chromatography that opened the door to modern methods of chromatography, such as liquid chromatography and gas chromatography.

== Life and education ==
=== Early life and education ===
William H. Stein was born on June 25, 1911 in New York City into a Jewish family. His father, Fred M. Stein, was a businessman who retired early to support local New York health organizations. His mother, Beatrice Borg Stein, was a children's rights activist who developed afterschool activities. Staunch advocates for the welfare of society, Stein's parents fostered his interests in the life sciences from a young age. As a child, Stein attended the recently established "progressive" Lincoln School which was sponsored by the Teachers College of Columbia University; there, he was able to explore the natural sciences through field trips and science projects. At the age of sixteen, Stein was transferred to the Phillips Exeter Academy in New England to prepare for higher education.

In 1936, during his graduate studies at Columbia University, William H. Stein married Phoebe Hockstader. They had three sons together: William H. Stein, Jr., David F. Stein, and Robert J. Stein. Stein lived with his family in New York the rest of his life—mainly in Manhattan and briefly in Scarsdale, New York.

=== Academic career ===
William H. Stein began his higher education as a chemistry major at Harvard University in 1929. He spent one year as a graduate student at Harvard University before transferring to the Department of Biological Chemistry at the College of Physicians and Surgeons, Columbia University, in 1934 to focus on biochemistry. Hans Thatcher Clarke, the chairman of the department at the time, was collecting many talented graduate students who would become the distinguished biochemists of the early twentieth century. In 1937, Stein completed his thesis on the amino acid composition of elastin, earning his Ph.D. Stein was introduced to potassium trioxalatochromate and ammonium rhodanilate by Max Bergmann, a Jewish-German biochemist who fled to the United States in 1934 under threat of Nazi occupation and worked in a laboratory at the Rockefeller Institute. He used these two precipitating agents to isolate the amino acids glycine and proline, respectively, for his research on elastin. With the conclusion of his academic career, Stein went on to work under Bergmann.

=== Later life and death ===
William H. Stein and his wife traveled around the world and hosted many prominent scientists in their own home in New York City throughout his scientific career. In addition to Stein's long-term professorship at Rockefeller Institute, he served as a visiting professor to the University of Chicago in 1961 and Harvard University in 1964. Stein also lectured at the Washington University in St. Louis and Haverford College.

In 1969, Stein experienced sudden paralysis, diagnosed as Guillain–Barré syndrome, after developing a fever several days prior during a symposium in Copenhagen. Despite remaining quadriplegic the rest of his life, Stein's colleagues alleged that his spirit and sense of humor endured. He continued to be a guiding presence at the Rockefeller Institute to his younger colleagues and their work on the study of RNase. At the age of sixty-eight, Stein experienced unexpected heart failure. William H. Stein died February 2, 1980 in New York City.

== Scientific career ==
=== Early work ===
Following the completion of his formal education, Stein became a researcher under Bergmann at Rockefeller Institute, where much of his most important work was done. Stanford Moore joined Bergmann's lab in 1939, where he and Stein began research focusing on amino acids. According to Moore, "During the early years of our cooperation, Stein and I worked out a system of collaboration that lasted for a lifetime." Their work in this area was disrupted with the beginning of World War II, and they temporarily parted ways to aid the war efforts, Stein staying with Bergmann to research the molecular scale effect of blister agents on the human body. They began collaborating again, however, after Bergmann died in 1944 and they were given an opportunity by the Director of the Rockefeller Institute, Herbert S. Gasser, to continue Bergmann's work in amino acids.

=== Chromatography ===
Stein and Moore developed a method to quantify and separate amino acids with column chromatography, using potato starch as the stationary phase. The fractions, originally collected manually, were collected in their newly developed automated fraction collector, and the amount of each amino acid was determined by an adjusted color reaction with ninhydrin. They began testing other methods of separation, such as ion exchange chromatography, to reduce the analysis time, as it took two weeks to analyze one protein using the starch columns. Ion exchange chromatography reduced the time to 5 days during initial experiments, and eventually Stein and Moore whittled the process down even further with the help of Daryl Spackman, which resulted in the first automatic amino acid analyzer. Along with their well-known work in protein sequences, this automatic amino acid analyzer was also utilized in Stein's study of amino acids in human urine and blood plasma.

=== Determination of protein sequences ===
With their success in improving the analysis time for amino acids, Stein and Moore began to determine the structure of an entire protein molecule, specifically bovine ribonuclease, in the early 1950s. They determined the entire sequence of ribonuclease by 1960. This sequence combined with X-ray analysis of the crystallized ribonuclease lead to the determination of the nuclease's active site. Stein won a Nobel Prize in Chemistry in 1972 with Moore and Christian Boehmer Anfinsen, for their work on ribonuclease and "for their contribution to the understanding of the connection between chemical structure and catalytic activity of the ribonuclease molecule."

== Awards and honors ==
=== Awards ===
William H. Stein received a number of awards for his contributions to the biochemical field, including:

- American Chemical Society Award in Chromatography and Electrophoresis (1964) with Stanford Moore
- Richards Medal of the American Chemical Society (1972) with Stanford Moore
- Kaj Linderstrøm-Lang Award, Copenhagen (1972) with Stanford Moore
- The Nobel Prize in Chemistry (1972) with Stanford Moore and Christian B. Anfinsen

=== Honors ===
William H. Stein received numerous honors from Columbia University and the Albert Einstein College of Medicine of Yeshiva University, including: D.Sc. honoris causa, Columbia University (1973), D.Sc. honoris causa, Albert Einstein College of Medicine of Yeshiva University (1973), and the Award of Excellence Medal, Columbia University Graduate Faculty and Alumni Association (1973).

=== Scientific societies ===
William H. Stein was a member of several scientific societies, including the: National Academy of Sciences (elected to membership in 1960), American Academy of Arts and Sciences (elected to membership in 1960), American Society of Biological Chemists, Biochemical Society of London, American Chemical Society, American Association for the Advancement of Science, and Harvey Society of New York.

== See also ==
- List of Jewish Nobel laureates
