= Transmethylation =

Chemical reaction

The recovery of methionine from homocysteine by transmethylation is depicted in reaction 4. The transmethylation cycle is depicted in reactions 1–4.

Transmethylation is a biologically important organic chemical reaction in which a methyl group is transferred from one compound to another.

An example of transmethylation is the recovery of methionine from homocysteine. In order to sustain sufficient reaction rates during metabolic stress, this reaction requires adequate levels of vitamin B_{12} and folate. Methyl tetrahydrofolate delivers methyl groups to form the active methyl form of vitamin B_{12} that is required for methylation of homocysteine. Deficiencies of vitamin B_{12} or folate cause increased levels of circulating homocysteine. Elevated homocysteine is a risk factor for cardiovascular disease and is linked to the metabolic syndrome (insulin insensitivity).

Transmethylation is decreased sometimes in parents of children with autism.

== See also ==
- Methylation
