= Stanford Moore =

American biochemist (1930–1982)

- Born: September 4, 1913; Chicago, Illinois
- Died: August 23, 1982 (aged 68); New York City, New York
- Education: Vanderbilt University; University of Wisconsin–Madison; University School of Nashville
- Known for: Ribonuclease
- Awards: Nobel Prize in Chemistry in 1972
- Scientific career
- Fields: Biochemistry
- Workplaces: Rockefeller University
- Thesis: The identification of carbohydrates as benzimidazole derivatives (1938)
- Doctoral advisor: Karl Paul Link

Stanford Moore (September 4, 1913 – August 23, 1982) was an American biochemist. He shared a Nobel Prize in Chemistry in 1972, with Christian B. Anfinsen and William Howard Stein, for work done at Rockefeller University on the structure of the enzyme ribonuclease and for contributing to the understanding of the connection between the chemical structure and catalytic activity of the ribonuclease molecule.

Moore attended Peabody Demonstration School, now known as University School of Nashville, and in 1935 graduated summa cum laude from Vanderbilt University, where he was a member of Phi Kappa Sigma. He earned his doctorate in Organic Chemistry from the University of Wisconsin–Madison in 1938. Moore then joined the staff of the Rockefeller Institute, later Rockefeller University, where he spent his entire professional career, with the exception of a period of government service during World War II. He became Professor of Biochemistry in 1952.

In 1958, he and William H. Stein developed the first automated amino acid analyzer, which facilitated the determination of protein sequences. In 1959, Moore and Stein announced the first determination of the complete amino acid sequence of an enzyme, ribonuclease, work which was cited in the Nobel award.

The careers of Moore and Stein were inextricably intertwined; Moore's final publication was the National Academy of Sciences Biographical Memoir of Stein.

Moore bequeathed his estate to Rockefeller University "to help a young scholar have the same opportunity that I had."
