= Hans Thacher Clarke =

- Born: 27 December 1887; Harrow, England
- Died: 21 October 1972 (aged 84); Boston, USA
- Education: University College, London
- Known for: the Eschweiler-Clarke reaction
- Awards: King's Award (1948)
- Scientific career
- Fields: Biochemistry
- Workplaces: Kodak; Columbia University; Yale University; Children's Cancer Relief Foundation

Hans Thacher Clarke (27 December 1887 – 21 October 1972) was a prominent biochemist during the first half of the twentieth century. He was born in England where he received his university training, but also studied in Germany and Ireland. He spent the remainder of his life in the United States.

== Biography ==
Clarke was born in Harrow in England. His father was Joseph Thacher Clarke, an archeologist. His older sister was the composer and violist Rebecca Clarke. Hans Clarke attended University College London School, and went on to enter the university as a student of chemistry, where he studied under William Ramsay, J. Norman Collie, and Samuel Smiles. He received a degree (Bachelor of Science) in 1908, and continued performing research at the university directed by Smiles and Stewart. In 1911 he was awarded an 1851 Exhibition Scholarship, which allowed him to study for three semesters in Berlin under Emil Fischer, and one semester with A. W. Stewart at Queen's College, Belfast. On his return he was granted the D.Sc. from London University in 1913.

== Career ==
Clarke's father had been the European representative of US photographic pioneer company Kodak for several years, and was a personal friend of founder George Eastman. After Hans graduated in Chemistry, Eastman consulted with him a few times regarding chemistry-related processes. When World War I erupted, Eastman was forced to look for other sources of the chemicals that he had been obtaining from Germany, and he turned to Hans Clarke for assistance. At Eastman's request, Clarke moved to Rochester, New York in 1914 to assist what he assumed to be the company's considerable chemical engineering department. He was shocked to discover that he was the sole organic chemist there.

Clarke stayed with Kodak until 1928, when he was invited to become the Professor of Biological Chemistry in the Columbia University College of Physicians and Surgeons. His administrative skills and ability to recognize talent contributed to the growth of Columbia's biochemistry department, which by the 1940s had become one of the largest and most influential in the United States.

As the dark events foreshadowing World War II pushed eminent Jewish scientists out of Europe, Clarke opened his laboratory to refugee biochemists, among them E. Brand, Erwin Chargaff, Zacharias Dische, K. Meyer, David Nachmansohn, Rudolph Schoenheimer, and Heinrich Waelsch.

As head of Columbia's Biochemistry Department, Clarke took a personal interest in graduate students, of whom he demanded rigorous qualifications prior to admission. As time went on he devoted less time to his own research, becoming inundated with departmental and professional responsibilities.

Clarke's time at Kodak resulted in few publications in the chemical literature, but he aided the preparation of 26 substances to the Organic Syntheses series, and checked some 65 others. He stayed associated with Kodak for the rest of his life, only retiring as a consultant in 1969. Among other researches, he was involved in the production of penicillin in the United States.

Clarke retired from Columbia in 1956 due to its mandatory retirement policy, but was able to move to Yale University, where he spent eight years in full-time research. When Yale required the space that he was occupying he moved again, and did another seven years' work at the Children's Cancer Relief Foundation in Boston, Massachusetts.

== Honors, awards, and professional societies ==
Clarke was elected to the National Academy of Sciences in 1942, and served on the boards of the Journal of the American Chemical Society and of the Journal of Biological Chemistry. He was a member of the American Philosophical Society, the American Chemical Society, the American Otological Society, and the American Society of Biological Chemists. He is probably best known for his work on the eponymously named Eschweiler-Clarke reaction. In 1973 his widow donated his voluminous personal and research papers to the American Philosophical Society.

Clarke was named Assistant Director of the Office of Scientific Research and Development in 1944, which placed him in charge of coordinating penicillin production in the United States.

Clarke served as science attaché to the US Embassy in London (1951–52). He was able to work closely with Sir Robert Robinson, with whom he had edited a major book on research in penicillin (issued in 1949).

Clarke was chairman of the Rochester section of the American Chemical Society (1921), the New York section (1946) and the Organic Chemistry Division (1924–25). He worked on the Committee on Professional Training, and the Garvin Award Committee. He was a president of the American Society of Biological Chemists (1947). He served on several grant-allocating committees. As a member of the Otological Society he served on a grants committee from 1956 to 1962. He was Chairman of the Merck Fellowship Board of the National Academy of Sciences in 1957.

Clarke was much in demand for his talents as a lucid writer and was called on to serve as editor or referee throughout his career. He sat on the editorial board of Organic Syntheses (1921–32), and on the editorial board of the Journal of Biological Chemistry (1937–51), and was associate editor of the Journal of the American Chemical Society (1928–38)

Clarke was an expert clarinet player, and received numerous requests to perform. His donated papers include one notebook dedicated to clarinet performance.
