= Jon Levine (neuroscientist) =

American neuroscientist

Jon D. Levine
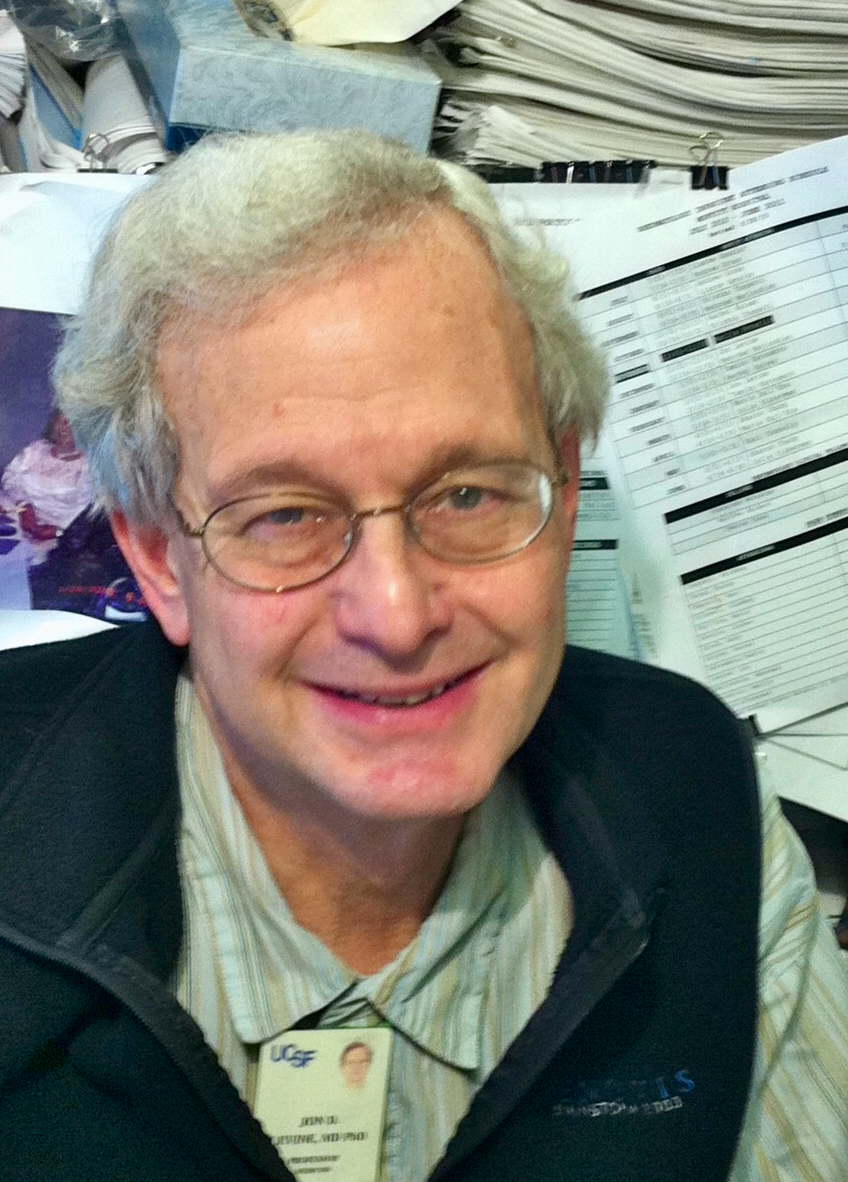
- Born: Jon David Levine; March 20, 1945
- Education: University of Michigan (BA)(MA); Yale University (PhD); University of California, San Francisco (MD)
- Scientific career
- Fields: Neuroscience
- Institutions: University of California, San Francisco
- Thesis: Neural Control of Flight in Wild Type and Mutant Drosophila Melanogaster (1972)
- Notable students: Fabrizio Benedetti

Jon David Levine is an American neuroscientist known for his research on pain and analgesia, particularly in the field of placebo studies. He is a professor of Medicine, Oral and Maxillofacial Surgery, and Neuroscience at the University of California, San Francisco (UCSF).

== Biography ==
Levine received his bachelor's degree in biophysics from the University of Michigan in 1966, a PhD in neuroscience from Yale University in 1972, and an MD degree from UCSF in 1978. He subsequently trained under Jack Stobo and Henry Bourne. He joined the UCSF faculty in 1987, and has been a professor of Medicine, Oral and Maxillofacial Surgery, and Neuroscience there since 1993.

== Research ==
Levine's research focuses on pain and analgesia, such as the mechanism of the placebo effect in relieving pain. In 1978, he published an influential study showing that placebo analgesia could be blocked by the opioid antagonist naloxone. According to Fabrizio Benedetti (one of Levine's students), this study represents the point when "the biology of placebo was born". He has also published research showing that kappa opioid agonist painkillers are more effective for women than for men. He has also conducted studies on rats with experimentally induced arthritis, showing that beta-2 adrenergic antagonists can reduce joint damage in these rats. This work has also shown that these antagonists also block receptors on cells that allow noradrenaline to enter them. In addition, he has researched the role of inflammation in arthritis, which, he has found, can be either positive or negative.
