= Sam Hawgood =

American professor (born c. 1953)

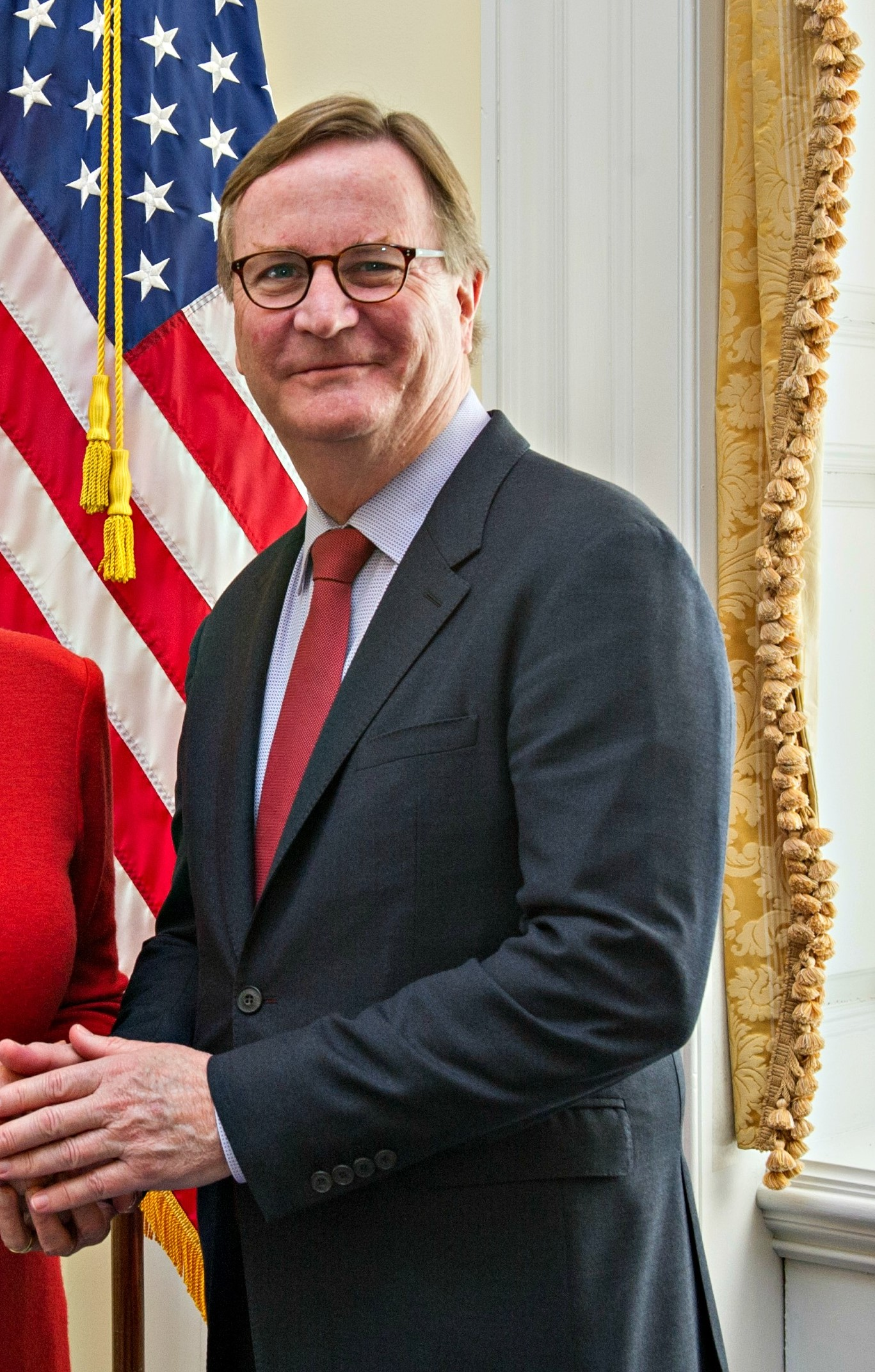
- Hawgood in 2016

10th Chancellor of the University of California, San Francisco
- Incumbent
- Assumed office 2014
- Preceded by: Susan Desmond-Hellmann

Personal details
- Born: Samuel Hawgood; 1953 (age 72–73) Australia
- Education: University of Queensland (MBBS)
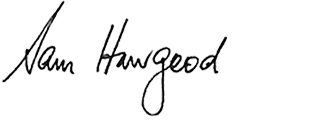
- Signature

Samuel Hawgood (born c. 1953) is a pediatrician, currently serving as the 10th chancellor of the University of California, San Francisco since 2014.

He received a Bachelor of Medicine, Bachelor of Surgery (MBBS) degree from the University of Queensland and completed residency at the Royal Children’s Hospital, Brisbane. Previously, he served as the dean of the UCSF School of Medicine.
