= Eric Coleman =

Eric Coleman may refer to:

- Eric D. Coleman (born 1951), Democratic Party politician in the United States
- Eric Coleman (defensive back) (born 1966), American football player
- Eric Coleman (producer) (born 1968), American television producer
- Eric Coleman (doctor) (born 1965), American geriatrician and academic

== See also ==
- Erik Coleman (born 1982), American football safety
