= Kimberly Tanner =

American biologist

- Born: Madison, Tennessee, U.S.
- Education: Rice University; University of California San Francisco; Stanford University
- Known for: SEPAL
- Scientific career
- Fields: Biology education, science education, cognitive psychology
- Workplaces: San Francisco State University
- Doctoral advisor: Jon Levine
- Website: www.sfsusepal.org/about/about-sepal

Kimberly Tanner is an American biologist and professor at San Francisco State University (SFSU) in San Francisco, California. Tanner is an elected fellow of the American Society for Cell Biology and the co-editor-in-chief for the journal CBE: Life Sciences Education.

== Education and career ==
Tanner received her bachelor's degree in biochemistry at Rice University in Houston, Texas in 1991. She received her Ph.D. in neuroscience at University of California, San Francisco in 1997. Tanner was under the advisement of Jon Levine where she used a combination of molecular, biochemical, behavioral and electrophysiological techniques to evaluate mechanisms that underlie pain and analgesia in mouse models. Following her Ph.D. she was a postdoctoral fellow at Stanford University and the University of California, San Francisco. In 2004 she moved to San Francisco State University where, as of 2022 she is a professor of biology.

Tanner is a founding member of the editorial board and, as of 2022, co-editor-in chief for CBE: Life Sciences Education.

== Research ==
Tanner's research focuses on biology and science education research, specifically on developing assessment tools to understand how people from K-12 to practicing scientists conceptualize science. Her Ph.D. dissertation focused on the structure and function of vincristine-induced neuropathy in mouse models. Her subsequent research was on metacognition and how students learn biology and thinking like biologists, teaching strategies in biology classrooms, and barriers to change in biology education in the classroom. She has also worked on DART, the Decibel Analysis Research in Teaching, a software tool that analyzes classroom sound.

== Selected publications ==
- Tanner, Kimberly; Allen, Deborah (December 2004). "Approaches to Biology Teaching and Learning: Learning Styles and the Problem of Instructional Selection—Engaging All Students in Science Courses". Cell Biology Education. 3 (4): 197–201. doi:10.1187/cbe.04-07-0050. ISSN 1536-7509. PMC 533116. PMID 15592590.
- Brownell, Sara E.; Tanner, Kimberly D. (2012-12-01). "Barriers to Faculty Pedagogical Change: Lack of Training, Time, Incentives, and…Tensions with Professional Identity?". CBE: Life Sciences Education. 11 (4): 339–346. doi:10.1187/cbe.12-09-0163. PMC 3516788. PMID 23222828.
- Tanner, Kimberly D. (2013-09-01). "Structure Matters: Twenty-One Teaching Strategies to Promote Student Engagement and Cultivate Classroom Equity". CBE: Life Sciences Education. 12 (3): 322–331. doi:10.1187/cbe.13-06-0115. PMC 3762997. PMID 24006379.
- Trujillo, Gloriana; Tanner, Kimberly D. (2014-03-01). "Considering the Role of Affect in Learning: Monitoring Students' Self-Efficacy, Sense of Belonging, and Science Identity". CBE: Life Sciences Education. 13 (1): 6–15. doi:10.1187/cbe.13-12-0241. PMC 3940464. PMID 24591497.
