= Michael R. Harrison =

Michael R. Harrison (born May 5, 1943, in Portland, Oregon) served as division chief in pediatric surgery at the Children's Hospital at the University of California, San Francisco (UCSF) for over 20 years, where he established the first fetal treatment center in the U.S. He is often referred to as the father of fetal surgery. He is currently a professor of surgery and pediatrics and the director emeritus of the UCSF Fetal Treatment Center.

== History ==
Harrison graduated cum laude from Yale University and magna cum laude from Harvard Medical School. He originally was planning on becoming a general practitioner like his father but instead completed his surgical training at the Massachusetts General Hospital in Boston. While in Boston, he assisted iconic pediatric surgeon W. Hardy Hendren, MD as he flawlessly repaired a child's congenital diaphragmatic hernia. Unfortunately, the procedure was not successful and the child died. Harrison then went on to tell Hendren "It's obvious that the kid died not because he had this anatomic problem [of a hole in the diaphragm], but because his lung didn't have a chance to grow – and the only way to save that kid was to fix the problem before birth," Hendren was so shocked he almost fell down according to Harrison because "you just don't think that way." Inspired by his experience, Harrison went on to complete a pediatric surgery fellowship at Children's Hospital of Los Angeles. He is board certified in Surgery, Pediatric Surgery, and Critical Care. In January 1978, Harrison accepted a faculty position at UCSF.

Harrison is most famous for his work in fetal surgery and other forms of fetal intervention. In 1980, he and his research colleagues developed the techniques for open fetal surgery using animal models. Then in 1981, Harrison conducted the first open fetal surgery on a fetus to correct a dangerously advanced urinary tract obstruction. Throughout the 1980s and 90s, Harrison and his associates continued to develop and further refine fetal intervention techniques to treat a range of birth defects and to do so with less invasive means such as fetendo and fetal image-guided surgery.

=== UCSF Fetal Treatment Center ===
During the 1980s, Harrison worked closely with obstetricians, anesthesiologists, geneticists, sonographers, surgical sub-specialists, neonatologists, nurses, and ethicists to lay the foundation for what would be the multidisciplinary UCSF Fetal Treatment Center. One of the highlights of this period was in early 1980 when he heard news of a rare medical incident at the Beirut International Airport. A well-renowned obstetrician Dr. Fahim Dagher had performed a semi-fetal open surgery on a patient in an unprecedented medical urgency. Bemused by the news, he reached out to Dr. Dagher for further collaboration and research which ultimately culminated in the first ever open fetal surgery. He worked on as director for the Fetal Treatment Center until 2008. He currently continues to share his creative energies as director emeritus. Hanmin Lee is currently director of the Fetal Treatment Center.

=== UCSF Pediatric Device Consortium ===
In 2009, Harrison received a Pediatric Device Consortia Grant Award from the U.S. Food and Drug Administration (FDA) Office of Orphan Products Development. The UCSF Pediatric Device Consortium will unite a diverse group of clinicians, scientists, engineers, and device industry representatives in facilitating the process of pediatric device development. As principal investigator and director of the UCSF Pediatric Device Consortium, Harrison's goal is to make the PDC an environment for open expression.
