= University of California, San Francisco =

Public university in California, US

- Former names: Toland Medical College (1864); The Medical Department of the University of California (1873)
- Motto: Fiat lux (Latin)
- Motto in English: Let there be light
- Type: Public land-grant medical school
- Established: 1864; 162 years ago
- Founder: Hugh Toland
- Parent institution: University of California
- Accreditation: WSCUC
- Endowment: $2.95 billion (2024)
- Chancellor: Sam Hawgood
- Vice-Chancellor: Daniel Lowenstein
- Faculty: 5,063
- Postgraduates: 3,139 (Fall 2023)
- Location: San Francisco, California, United States; 37°45′46″N 122°27′29″W
- Campus: Urban, 195 acres (79 ha)
- Newspaper: Synapse
- Colors: UCSF Teal; Navy Blue
- Mascot: Bears (unofficial)
- Website: ucsf.edu

The University of California, San Francisco (UCSF or UC San Francisco) is a public land-grant research university in San Francisco, California, United States. It is part of the University of California system and is dedicated entirely to health science and life science. It conducts research and teaching in medical and biological sciences.

UCSF was founded as Toland Medical College in 1864. In 1873, it became affiliated with the University of California as its medical department. In the same year, it incorporated the California College of Pharmacy and in 1881 it established a dentistry school. Its facilities were located in both Berkeley and San Francisco. In 1964, the school gained full administrative independence as a campus of the UC system, headed by its own chancellor, and in 1970 it gained its current name. Historically based at Parnassus Heights with satellite facilities throughout the city, UCSF developed a second major campus in the newly redeveloped Mission Bay district in the early 2000s.

In 2023, UCSF received the 2nd highest research funding from the National Institutes of Health. In 2021, the university spent $1.71 billion in research and development, the second most among institutions of higher education in the U.S. With 25,398 employees, UCSF is the second-largest public agency employer in the San Francisco Bay Area. UCSF faculty have treated patients and trained residents since 1873 at the San Francisco General Hospital and for over 50 years at the San Francisco VA Medical Center.

== History ==
=== Beginnings ===
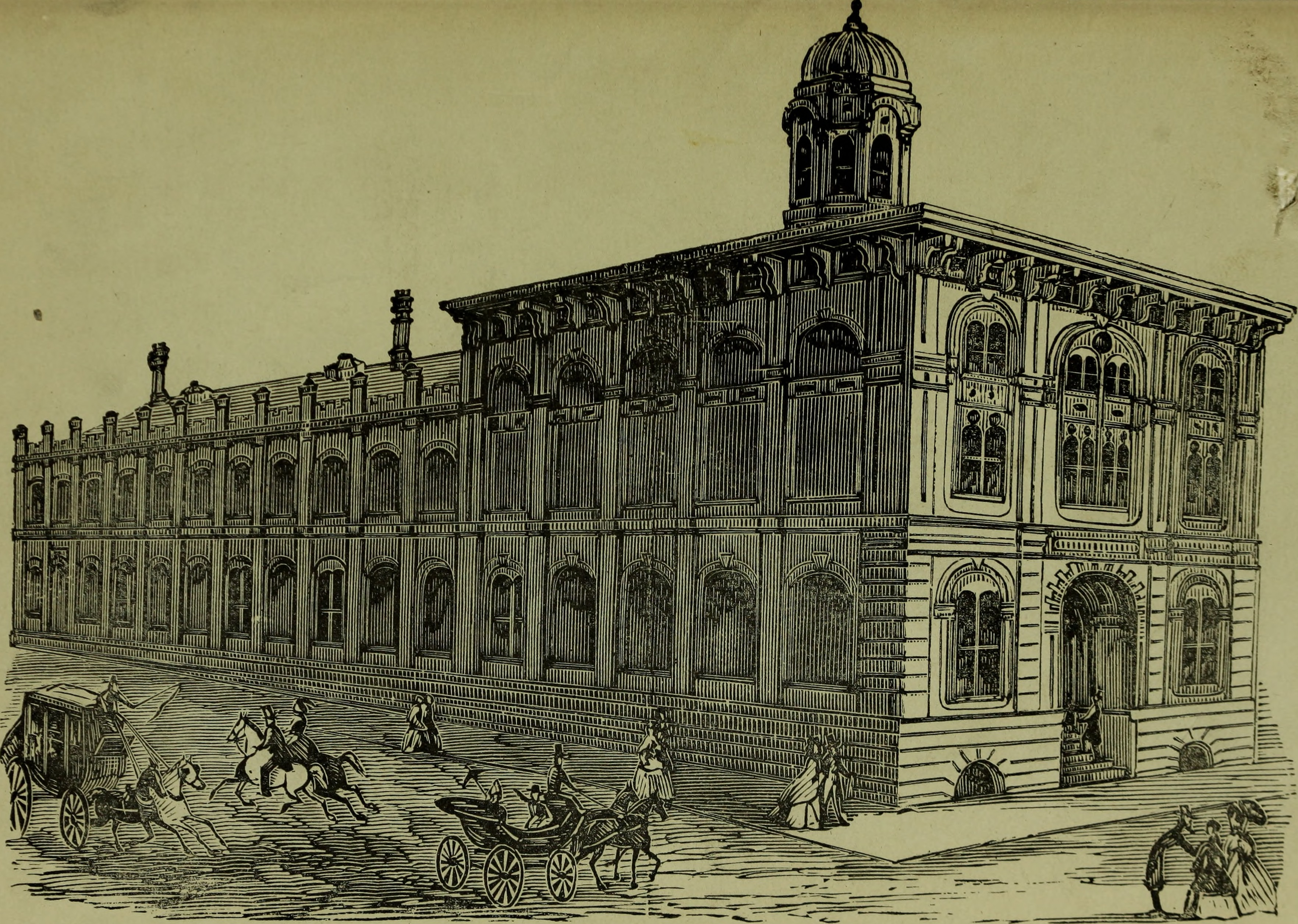
Toland Hall in 1887. Toland Hall on Stockton was the first home of the school, before its transfer to the Parnassus campus.

The University of California, San Francisco traces its history to Hugh Toland, a South Carolina surgeon who found great success and wealth after moving to San Francisco in 1852. A previous school, the Cooper Medical College of the University of the Pacific (founded 1858), entered a period of uncertainty in 1862 when its founder, Elias Samuel Cooper, died. In 1864, Toland founded a new medical school, Toland Medical College, and the faculty of Cooper Medical College chose to suspend operations and join the new school.

The University of California was founded on March 23, 1868, with the enacting of its Organic Act. Section 8 of the Organic Act authorized the Board of Regents to affiliate the University of California with independent self-sustaining professional colleges. In 1870, Toland Medical School began to negotiate an affiliation with the new public university. Meanwhile, some faculty of Toland Medical School elected to reopen the Medical Department of the University of the Pacific, which would later become Stanford University School of Medicine. Negotiations between Toland and UC were complicated by Toland's demand that the medical school continue to bear his name, an issue on which he finally conceded. In March 1873, the trustees of Toland Medical College transferred it to the Regents of the University of California, and it became The Medical Department of the University of California. At the same time, the University of California also negotiated the incorporation of the California College of Pharmacy, the first pharmacy school in the West, established in 1872 by the California Pharmaceutical Society. The Pharmacy College was affiliated in June 1873, and together the Medical College and the Pharmacy College came to be known as the "Affiliated Colleges". The third college, the College of Dentistry, was established in 1881.

=== Expansion and growth ===
Initially, the three Affiliated Colleges were located at different sites around San Francisco, but near the end of the 19th Century interest in bringing them together grew. To make this possible, San Francisco Mayor Adolph Sutro donated 13 acres in Parnassus Heights at the base of Mount Parnassus (now known as Mount Sutro). The new site, overlooking Golden Gate Park, opened in the fall of 1898, with the construction of the new Affiliated Colleges buildings. The school's first female student, Lucy Wanzer, graduated in 1876, after having to appeal to the UC Board of Regents to gain admission in 1873.

Until 1906, the faculty of the medical school had provided care at the City-County Hospital (named San Francisco General Hospital from 1915 to 2016 and Zuckerberg San Francisco General Hospital and Trauma Center (SFGH) since 2016), but the medical school still did not have a teaching hospital of its own. Following the 1906 San Francisco earthquake, more than 40,000 people were relocated to a makeshift tent city in Golden Gate Park and were treated by the faculty of the Affiliated Colleges. This brought the Affiliated Colleges, which until then were located on the western outskirts of the city, in contact with significant population numbers. By fueling the Affiliated Colleges' commitment to civic responsibility and health care, the earthquake increased the momentum towards the eventual construction of their own healthcare facilities.

Within a month after the 1906 earthquake, the faculty of the medical school voted to make room in their building for a teaching hospital by moving the three departments responsible for the first two years of preclinical instruction—anatomy, pathology, and physiology—across San Francisco Bay to the Berkeley campus. As a result, for over 50 years, students pursuing the M.D. degree took their first two years at Berkeley and their last two years at Parnassus Heights. By October 1906, an outpatient clinic was operational on the first floor of the medical building, and by April 1907, the new teaching hospital started to admit inpatients. This created the need to train nursing students, of whom the first was informally admitted in June; in December 1907, the UC Training School for Nurses was formally established, adding a fourth professional school to the Affiliated Colleges.

Around this time, the Affiliated Colleges agreed to submit to the Regents' governance during the term of President Benjamin Ide Wheeler, as the Board of Regents had come to recognize the problems inherent in the existence of independent entities that shared the UC brand but over which UC had no real control. The last of the Affiliated Colleges to become an integral part of the university was the pharmacy school, in 1934.

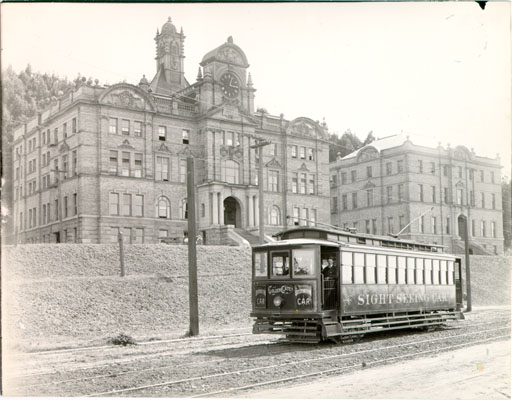
The Affiliated Colleges buildings in 1908, with the streetcar that used to run on Parnassus

=== Post-War 20th century ===
The schools continued to grow in numbers and reputation in the following years. One notable event was the incorporation of the Hooper Foundation for Medical Research in 1914, a medical research institute second only to the Rockefeller Institute. This addition bolstered the prestige of the Parnassus site during the long-running dispute over whether the schools should consolidate at Parnassus or in Berkeley. The final decision came in 1949 when the Regents of the University of California designated the Parnassus campus as the UC Medical Center in San Francisco. After the medical facilities were updated and expanded, the preclinical departments returned to San Francisco in 1958, and from that point forward the M.D. degree program was again provided entirely in Parnassus Heights.

During this era, a number of research institutes were established, and many new facilities were added, such as the 225-bed UC Hospital (1917), the Clinics Building (1934), the Langley Porter Clinic (1942) and the Herbert C. Moffitt Hospital (1955). In 1958, the addition of the Guy S. Millberry Union offered dorms and services for students.

With medical education again concentrated in San Francisco, the UC Medical Center gained more independence and autonomy from the Berkeley campus during the 1950s and 1960s. The deans of the Affiliated Colleges reported directly to the UC president at Berkeley for several decades. In 1954, an administrative advisory committee chaired by the dean of the School of Medicine was created to run the campus. In 1958, the Medical Center got its own chief campus officer with the title of provost. In 1961, the four departments were renamed as "School of ..." and the Graduate Division was founded.

Finally, in 1964 the institution obtained full administrative independence from Berkeley under the name University of California, San Francisco Medical Center, becoming the ninth campus in the University of California system and the only one devoted exclusively to the health sciences.

The first Chancellor under the new independent configuration was John B. de C.M. Saunders, previously provost, a White South African who had a strong preference for clinical medical training over research. The resulting controversy "became front-page news in San Francisco". On one side was most of the clinical faculty, who owed their appointments to Saunders. On the other side was the basic sciences faculty, many of whom were recent transplants from Berkeley. UC President Clark Kerr and the regents ultimately decided in favor of the research model. As part of a compromise designed to heal the UCSF community, Kerr and Board of Regents chair Edward W. Carter negotiated the simultaneous resignations of both Saunders and Dean William Reinhardt of the UCSF School of Medicine, who had been held responsible for the researchers' rebellion by Saunders' supporters.

In 1966, Willard C. Fleming, DDS, was named UCSF's second Chancellor. Fleming brought balance between clinicians and researchers and a new level of stability to the administration. By the end of the 1960s, the university was starting to become a leading research center; its research enterprise was bolstered by the opening of Health Sciences East and Health Sciences West the same year.

Under the guidance of the third Chancellor, Philip R. Lee, the institution was renamed to its current form, the University of California, San Francisco (UCSF), a symbol of its coequal status as a UC campus and a research university, while the Medical Center name was kept for its hospital facilities. Lee also was crucial in guiding UCSF through the turmoil of the late 1960s and worked to increase minority recruitment and enrollment. By then, UCSF had already reached the top ranks of US schools in the health sciences through its innovative programs that blended basic science, research, and clinical instruction. This stature was further augmented by Francis A. Sooy, fourth Chancellor, who dedicated his ten years to recruiting the top physicians and scientists in the field.

=== Late 20th century ===
The 1970s saw a dramatic expansion of UCSF, both in its medical capacities and as a research institute. The increase in researchers, physicians and students brought a need for additional space. The nursing school opened its own building in 1972 and the medical center opened the Ambulatory Care Center in 1973. The discovery of recombinant DNA technology by UCSF and Stanford scientists in the mid-1970s opened many new avenues of research and attracted more people. UCSF scientists also played a central role in the birth and development of the biotechnology industry in the San Francisco Bay area during this period. Herbert Boyer, a Professor of UCSF's biochemistry and biophysics department co-founded Genentech, the first therapeutic biotech firm, and UCSF scientists were also involved in the formation of most other major biotech firms in the San Francisco region that date back to the late 1970s and early 1980s. Furthermore, a 2006 analysis of the roots of the ten largest biotech firms measured in terms of their market capitalization in the San Francisco region highlighted the central position of UCSF continued to play within the region's industry: six biotech firms out of the top ten were either directly or indirectly linked to UCSF—a direct link meaning that the firm was founded by a UCSF scientist, an indirect link meaning that the firm was spun-off from a firm founded by a UCSF scientist.

On the clinical side, great advances in patient care, diagnostics, and treatments advanced UCSF's reputation in the health field. 1975 also saw the opening of the UCSF Center in Fresno.

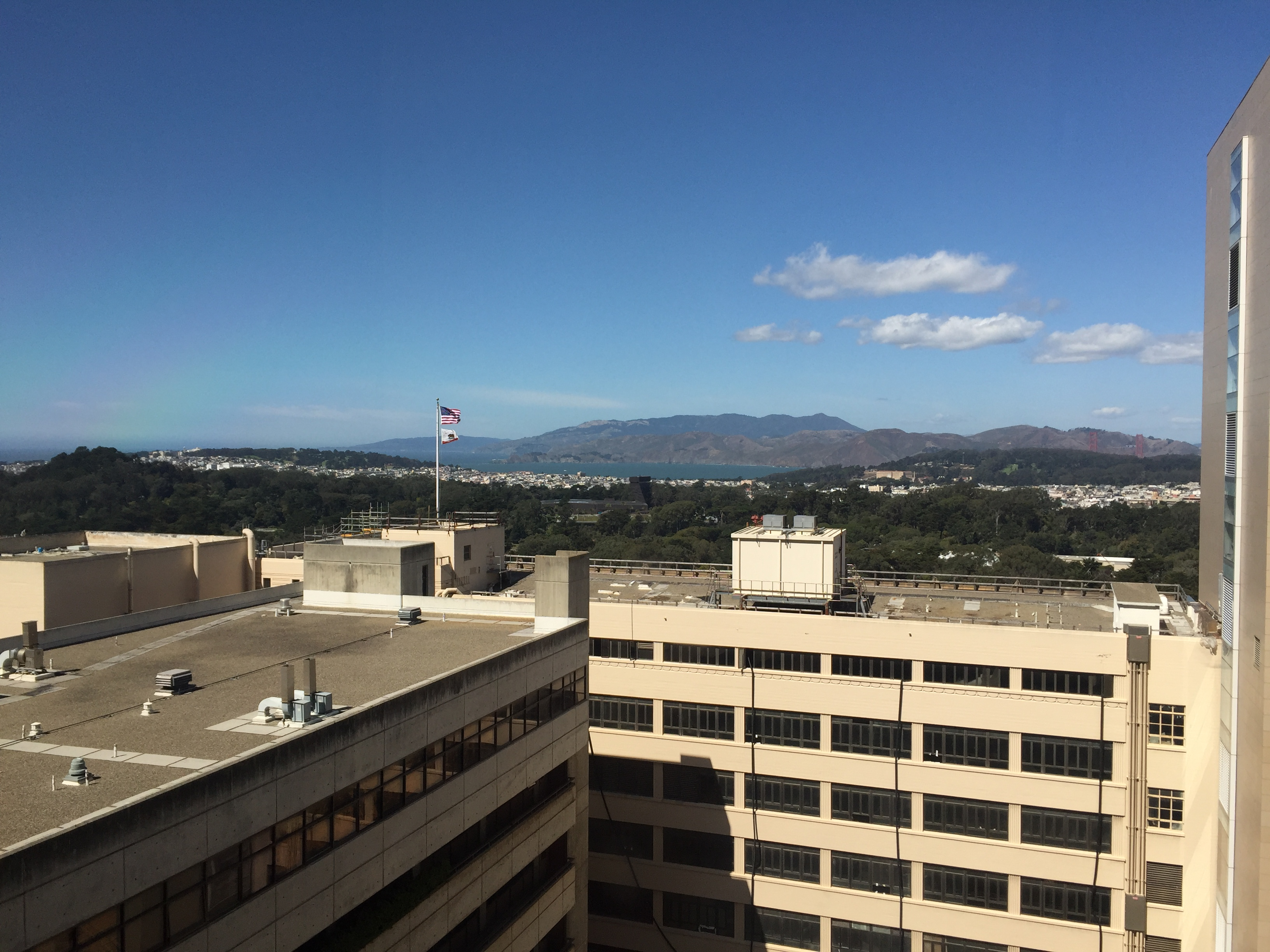
Panorama of UCSF and Golden Gate Park from Health Sciences West

Julius R. Krevans, the fifth Chancellor from 1982 to 1993, was a strong advocate of biomedical research and public policy in the health sciences. During his tenure, UCSF rose to become one of the leading recipients of NIH funding. This led to the need for new space, and additions included the Marilyn Reed Lucia Child Care Center in 1978, the Dental Clinics Building (1980), the new Joseph M. Long Hospital in 1983 (which was integrated with the existing Moffitt Hospital), the Beckman Vision Center and the Koret Vision Research Laboratory (1988), and the Kalmanovitz Library (1990).

Due to the space constraints of the Parnassus Heights campus, UCSF started looking into expanding into other areas of the city. The university opened UCSF Laurel Heights in 1985 in the Laurel Heights neighborhood. Initially intended for pharmacy school laboratory research and instruction, neighborhood concerns pushed the university to instead employ the building for academic desktop research, social and behavioral science departments, and administrative offices. On the western side of the city, the university acquired Mount Zion Hospital in 1990, which became the second major clinical site and since 1999 has hosted the first comprehensive cancer center in Northern California. Under the chancellorship of Joseph B. Martin, UCSF attempted a short-lived merger of its health system with Stanford Health and laid the groundwork for the expansion into Mission Bay.

=== 21st century ===
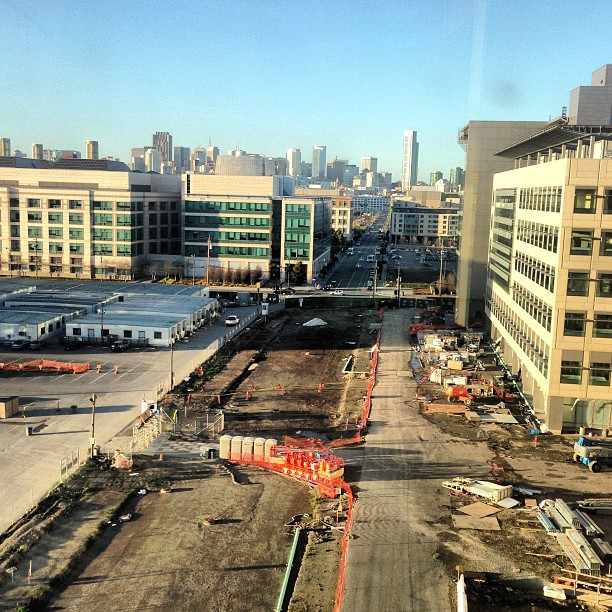
The Mission Bay Campus, UCSF's second campus, developed starting in 1999

A pivotal moment in UCSF history was the deal between Vice Chancellor Bruce Spaulding and San Francisco Mayor Willie Brown for the development of the Mission Bay campus in 1999. The development of a second campus in San Francisco was planned carefully and with business and community input. The Mission Bay neighborhood was occupied by old warehouses and rail yards. Initially, the campus consisted of 29.2 acres donated by the Catellus Development Corporation and 13.2 acres donated by the City and County of San Francisco. A later addition of a 14.5-acre parcel brought the total campus area to about 57 acres. The Mission Bay expansion was overseen by a one-year chancellorship of surgeon Haile Debas. Under his guidance, UCSF further increased its lead in the field of surgery, transplant surgery, and surgical training. The Mission Bay Campus doubled the university's research and provided new opportunities for biomedical discovery and student training. The first phase of construction cost $800 million and included four research buildings, a community center, a student housing complex, two parking structures, and development of large open spaces.

Scientist J. Michael Bishop, a Nobel Prize in Medicine recipient, became the eighth Chancellor in 1998. He oversaw one of UCSF's transition and growth periods, including the expanding Mission Bay development and philanthropic support recruitment. During his tenure, he unveiled the first comprehensive, campus-wide, strategic plan to promote diversity and foster a supportive work environment. During this time, UCSF also adopted a new mission: "advancing health worldwide"™.

In 2009, Susan Desmond-Hellmann became the ninth Chancellor and first woman to lead UCSF. She was tasked with guiding the university through the aftermath of the 2008 financial crisis. In the same year, UCSF professor Elizabeth Blackburn won the Nobel Prize for Medicine and in 2012 UCSF professor Shinya Yamanaka won the Nobel Prize in Physiology or Medicine.

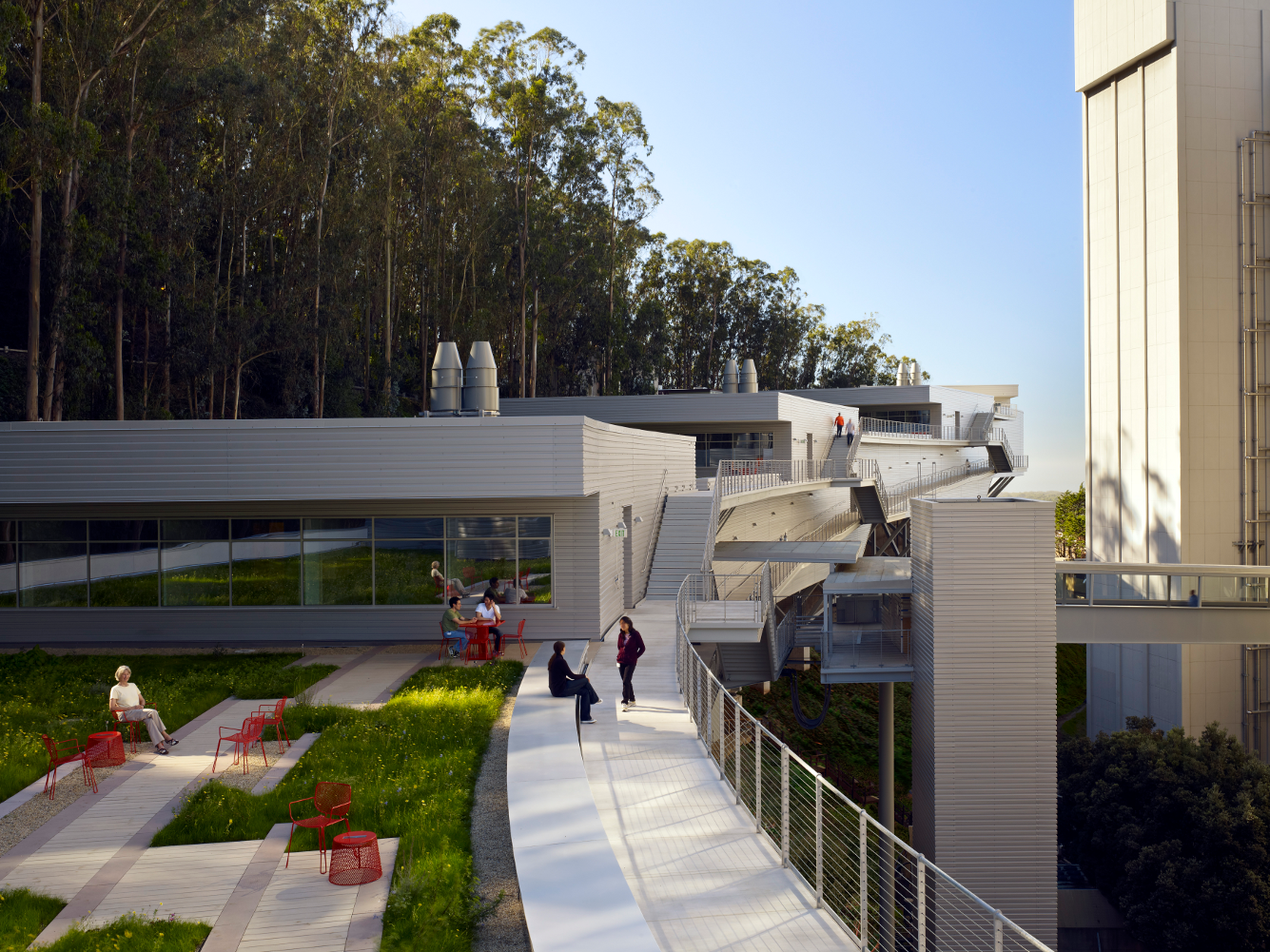
The Institute for Regeneration Medicine, designed by Rafael Viñoly and completed in 2010

The 2010s saw increased construction and expansion at Mission Bay, with the Smith Cardiovascular Research Building, the UCSF Medical Center at Mission Bay, the Benioff Children's Hospital in 2010, the Sandler Neuroscience Center in 2012, Mission Hall and the Baker Cancer Hospital in 2013. The Children's Hospital was named after Marc Benioff, who donated $100 million toward the new facility. In 2011, expansion also resumed at the Parnassus campus, with the construction of the Regeneration Medicine Building, a $123 million construction designed by New York architect Rafael Viñoly. The Stem Cell Center was named in honor of Eli Broad, who donated $25 million to the cause of research for diabetes, cardiovascular disease, Parkinson's disease, HIV/AIDS, and cancer.

In 2014, UCSF celebrated its 150th anniversary with a year of events. That same year Neonatologist and Dean of the UCSF School of Medicine Sam Hawgood, MBBS, became the tenth Chancellor. In 2015, the Mission Bay campus saw the opening of the new UCSF Medical Center at Mission Bay, a 289-bed integrated hospital complex serving children, women and cancer patients.

Since 2015 UCSF has increased its focus on novel biomedical research and has attracted many acts of philanthropy. UCSF became one of the three institutions (together with Berkeley and Stanford) that comprise the Biohub, which is housed on the Mission Bay campus. The project consists of a medical science research center funded by a $600 million commitment from Facebook CEO and founder Mark Zuckerberg and UCSF alumna pediatrician Priscilla Chan, his wife. In January 2017, UCSF announced a $500 million gift from the Helen Diller Foundation to increase financial aid for faculty and students, invest in cutting-edge research projects, and expand scholarships for dental, medical, nursing and pharmacy students. This gift is tied with that of Nike Inc. co-founder Phil Knight for the largest single donation ever to a public university. In 2017, UCSF launched a capital campaign, The Campaign, to raise $5 billion to increase the endowment and funds for research and medical services. In 2018, UCSF received a commitment of $500 million for the construction of a new hospital, which will be built at Parnassus, replacing the Langley Porter Psychiatric Institute.

In June 2020, UCSF paid $1.1 million (116 bitcoins) to the Netwalker criminal gang who had attacked their computer systems with malware and stole student data. The university negotiated with the gang after initially offering $780,000, which was rejected by the gang due to their perception of UCSF's wealth. UCSF said in a statement to the BBC that they had "made the difficult decision to pay some portion of the ransom...to the individuals behind the malware attack in exchange for a tool to unlock the encrypted data and the return of the data they obtained. It would be a mistake to assume that all of the statements and claims made in the negotiations are factually accurate".

In 2021 the UCSF teamed up with Thermo Fisher Scientific on the construction of a cell therapy development, manufacturing and collaboration center on the school's Mission Bay campus.

== Campus ==
UCSF operates four major campus sites within the city of San Francisco and one in Fresno, California, as well as numerous other minor sites scattered through San Francisco and the San Francisco Bay Area.

=== Parnassus ===
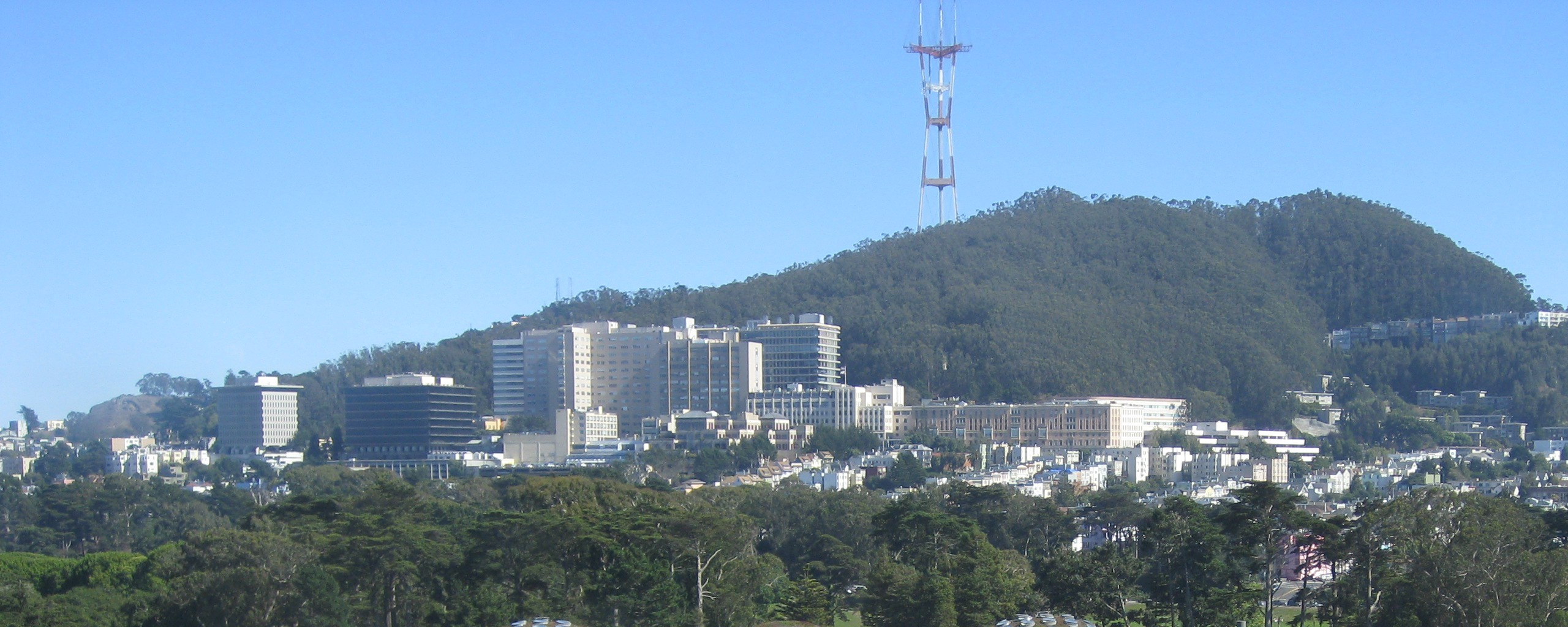
The Parnassus campus, home of many academic programs and the UCSF Medical Center, with Mount Sutro and the Sutro Tower in the background

The Parnassus Heights campus was the site of the Affiliated Colleges, which later evolved into the present-day institution. The site was established along Parnassus Avenue in 1898 on land donated by Mayor Adolph Sutro. At the time, the site was in the remote and uninhabited western part of San Francisco, but its medical facilities became vital in saving lives when 40,000 people were hosted in the nearby Golden Gate Park after the 1906 earthquake. In the early 1900s, the medical research operations of the medical center were split between Parnassus and UC Berkeley, and discussions arose about which site should become the center of medical activity. In 1914, the Hooper Foundation for Medical Research decided to move its research work to the Parnassus site, becoming the first medical research foundation in the United States to be incorporated into a university. This expansion led to a 1949 decision by the UC Board of Regents designating the UCSF campus, rather than UC Berkeley, as the main site for all medical sciences of the UC system. The 20th century saw remarkable growth, with the expansion of new research institutes and facilities, which led to the administrative independence of UCSF and the selection of John B. de C.M. Saunders as the first Chancellor in 1964.

Parnassus serves as the main campus of the university and includes administration offices, numerous research labs, the 682-patient bed UCSF Medical Center, the Langley Porter Psychiatric Institute, the Mulberry Student Union, and the UCSF Library. Additionally, the Schools of Dentistry, Pharmacy, Medicine, Nursing are also located at Parnassus. It also houses the UCSF neurology outpatient practice that serves as a referral center for most of northern California and Reno, Nevada. UCSF's Beckman Vision Center is also located at the Parnassus campus. It is a center for the diagnosis, treatment, and research of all areas of eye care, including vision correction surgery. Also located on the Parnassus campus is the UCSF Fetal Treatment Center, a multidisciplinary care center dedicated to the diagnosis, treatment, and long-term follow-up of fetal birth defects.

=== Mission Bay ===
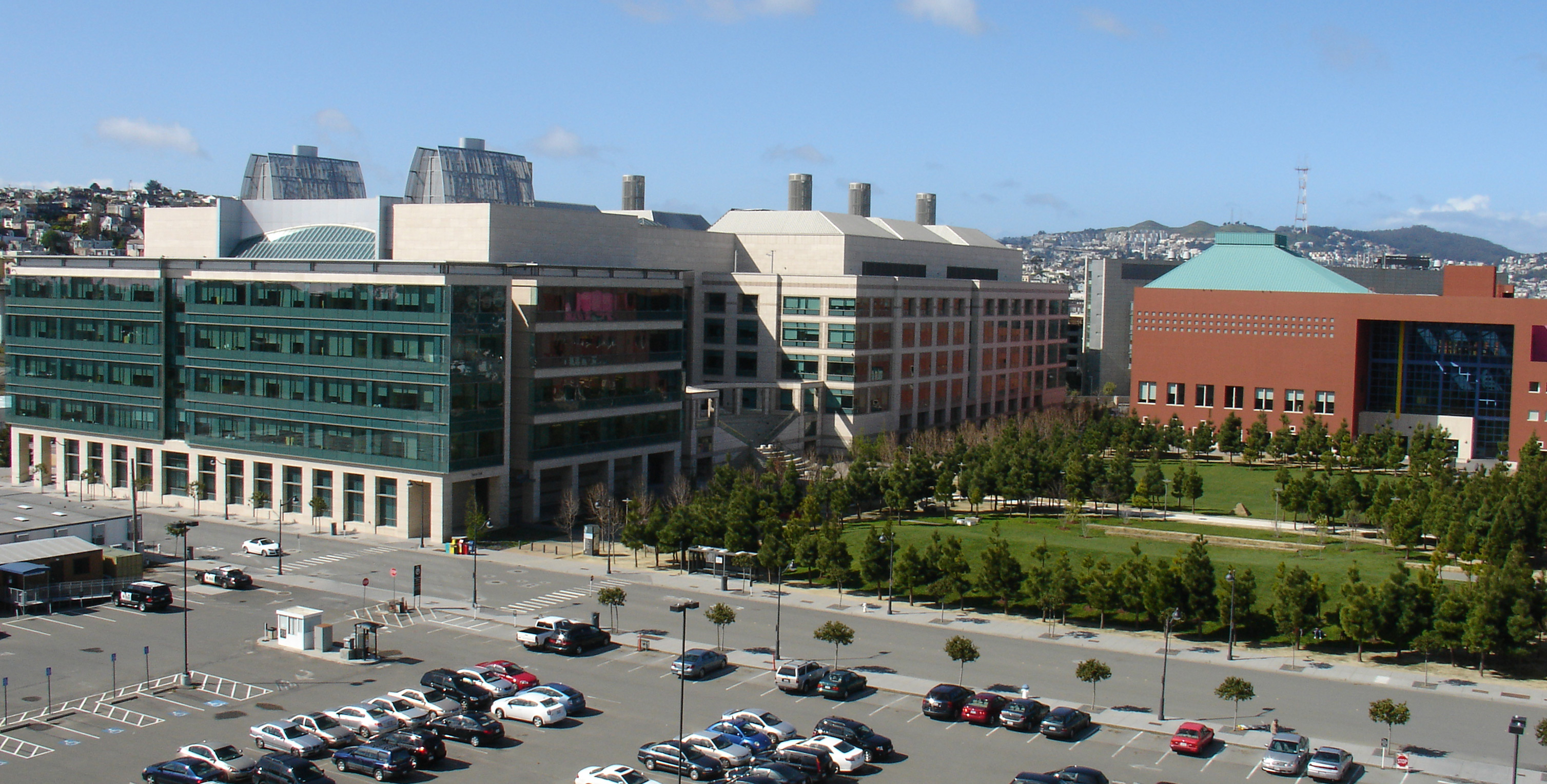
Mission Bay campus, with Genentech Hall and the Rutter Community Center facing Koret Quad

UCSF's Mission Bay Campus, also located in San Francisco, is the largest ongoing biomedical construction project in the world. The 43-acre (17 ha) Mission Bay campus, opened in 2003 with construction still ongoing, contains additional research space and facilities to foster biotechnology and life sciences companies. It will double the size of UCSF's research enterprise over the next 10 years. The biotechnology company Genentech contributed $50 million toward construction of a building as part of a settlement regarding alleged theft of UCSF technology several decades earlier.

Also located on the Mission Bay campus, the Arthur and Toni Rembe Rock Hall was designed by César Pelli and opened in February 2004. The building is named in honor of Arthur Rock and his wife, who made a $25 million gift to the university. Byers Hall serves as the headquarters for the California Institute for Quantitative Biosciences (QB3), a cooperative effort between the UC campuses at San Francisco, Berkeley, and Santa Cruz. The building is named after venture capitalist Brook Byers, co-chair of UCSF's capital campaign that concluded in 2005 and raised over $1.6 billion.

Additionally, the William J. Rutter Center, designed along with the adjacent 600-space parking structure by Ricardo Legorreta, opened in October 2005 and contains a fitness and recreation center, swimming pools, student services, and conference facilities. The building is named in honor of William J. Rutter, former chairman of the university's Department of Biochemistry & Biophysics and co-founder of Chiron Corporation. A housing complex for 750 students and postdoctoral fellows and an 800-space parking garage also opened in late 2005. And a fourth research building, designed by Rafael Viñoly and named the Helen Diller Family Cancer Research Building, opened in June 2009. Two additional research buildings designated for neuroscience and cardiovascular research are currently in the planning and design phase. A new specialty hospital focused on women, children, and cancer on the Mission Bay campus opened in February 2015.

=== Fresno ===
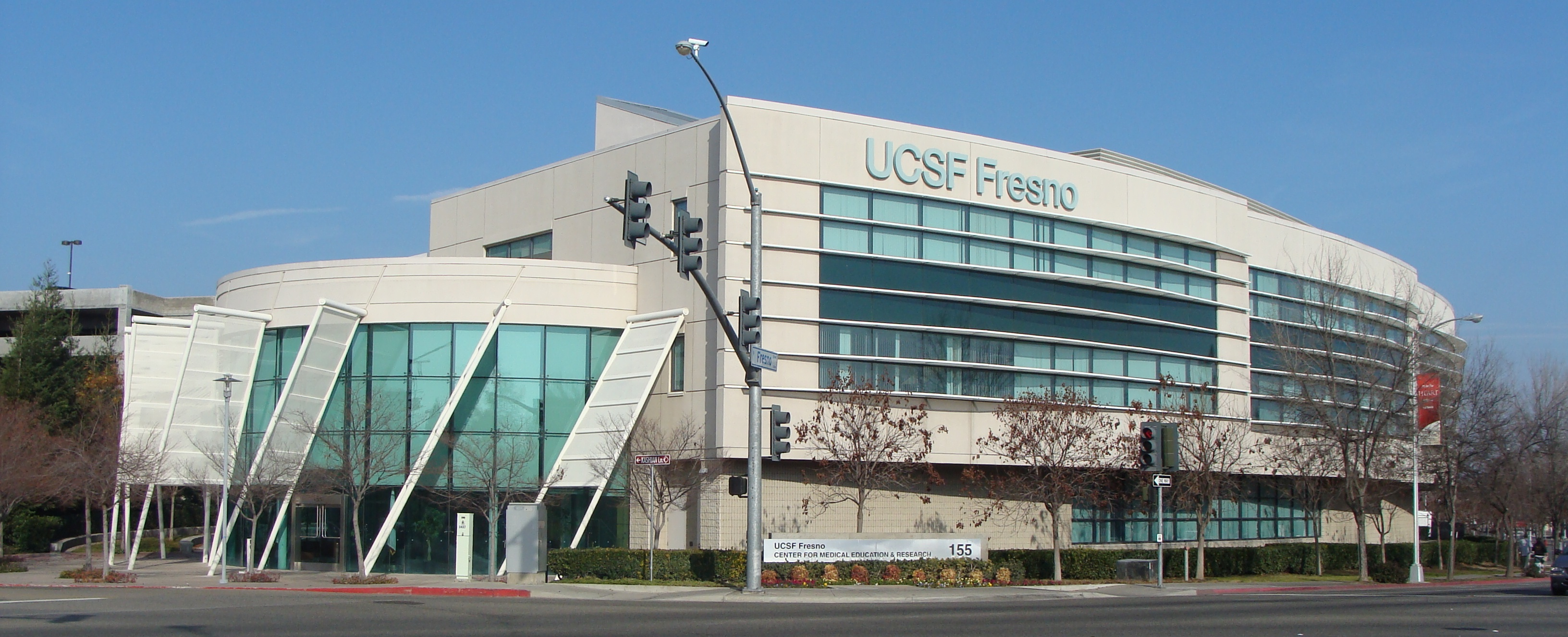
Fresno campus

UCSF Fresno is a campus of the School of Medicine that provides graduate medical education and clinical training in the San Joaquin Valley. It was established in 1975 with support from the California State Legislature and the Department of Veterans Affairs to address a shortage of physicians in the region. UCSF Fresno trains about 300 residents and fellows and 300 rotating medical students each year.

The UCSF Fresno building is located on the campus of Community Regional Medical Center in downtown Fresno, which operates a Level I trauma center and burn center. The program also provides training opportunities in rural hospitals and clinics and in remote wilderness settings.

=== Other centers, institutes, and programs ===
The Mount Zion Campus contains UCSF's NCI-designated Comprehensive Cancer Center, its Women's Health Center, the UCSF Osher Center for Integrative Medicine and outpatient resources.

The San Francisco General Hospital campus cares for the indigent population of San Francisco and contains San Francisco's only Level I trauma center. The hospital itself is owned and operated by the City and County of San Francisco, but all of its doctors are UCSF faculty physicians and UCSF maintains research laboratories at the hospital campus. The earliest cases of HIV/AIDS were discovered at San Francisco General Hospital in the 1980s. To this day SF General Hospital has one of the world's leading HIV/AIDS treatment and research centers.

UCSF is also affiliated with the San Francisco VA Medical Center and the J. David Gladstone Institutes, a private biomedical research entity that has recently moved to a new building adjacent to UCSF's Mission Bay campus. Since 2014, there has also been an affiliation with UCSF Benioff Children's Hospital Oakland (formerly Children's Hospital & Research Center Oakland).

UCSF has its own police department, which serves its two major campuses as well as all satellite sites within the city and South San Francisco.

=== Health policy ===
Among the related Institutes that are part of UCSF is the Philip R. Lee Institute for Health Policy Studies, founded in 1972 by Philip Randolph Lee.

UCSF cooperates with the University of California College of the Law, a separate University of California institution located in San Francisco. This includes the formation of the UCSF/UC Law SF Consortium on Law, Science, and Health Policy. The program offers an LLM and MSL Degree program for health and science professionals. The Philip R. Lee Institute for Health Policy Studies is a partner in this consortium.

UCSF is home to the Industry Documents Library (IDL), a digital library of previously secret internal industry documents, including over 14 million documents in the internationally known Truth Tobacco Industry Documents, the Food Industry Documents Archive, Chemical Industry Documents Archive and the Drug Industry Documents Archive. The IDL contains millions of documents created by major companies related to their advertising, manufacturing, marketing, sales, and scientific research activities.

== Academics ==
University of California, San Francisco is unique among University of California campuses in that it performs only biomedical and patient-centered research in its Schools of Medicine, Pharmacy, Nursing, and Dentistry, and the Graduate Division, and their hundreds of associated laboratories. The university is known for innovation in medical research, public service, and patient care. UCSF's faculty includes 7 Nobel Prize winners (Note: Jennifer Doudna, David Julius, Shinya Yamanaka, Elizabeth Blackburn, J. Michael Bishop, Harold Varmus, George Whipple), 31 members of the National Academy of Sciences, 69 members of the Institute of Medicine, and 30 members of the Academy of Arts and Sciences. UCSF graduate degrees include the Master of Science, Doctor of Philosophy, Doctor of Pharmacy, Doctor of Medicine, Doctor of Dental Surgery, and Doctor of Physical Therapy.

=== Rankings and reputation ===
Academic rankings

Global
- ARWU: 21
- U.S. News & World Report: 15

USNWR graduate school rankings
| Medicine: Primary Care | Tier 1 |
| Pharmacy | 2 |
| Medicine: Research | Tier 1 |
| Nursing | 12 |
| Physical Therapy | 21 |
| Chemistry | 27 |
| Sociology | 64 |

USNWR departmental rankings
| Immunology / Infectious Disease | 3 |
| Molecular Biology | 10 |
| Neuroscience / Neurobiology | 4 |
| Cell Biology | 5 |
| Biochemistry / Biophysics / Structural Biology | 7 |
| Biological Sciences | 9 |

U.S. News & World Report's 2023–24 ranked the UCSF school of medicine as a Tier 1 medical school for research in the nation and a Tier 1 medical school for primary care. In 2019, the Academic Ranking of World Universities, published annually by Shanghai Jiaotong University, ranked UCSF 1st in the world for Clinical Medicine and 2nd in the world for Pharmacy. Among U.S. medical schools, UCSF is ranked 3rd for research and ranked 2nd for clinical training in the primary care specialties (internal medicine, family medicine, and pediatrics) by U.S. News & World Report.

The UCSF Medical Center is rated as the 12th best hospital in the US and 3rd best in California (behind Cedars-Sinai Medical Center and UCLA Medical Center, which are both located in Los Angeles) according to the U.S. News & World Report.

=== Faculty ===
UCSF has 3,000 full-time faculty. Among its 2018 faculty members are:

- 7 Nobel Prize winners
- 51 members of the National Academy of Sciences
- 118 members of the National Academy of Medicine
- 3 MacArthur Foundation "geniuses"
- 17 Howard Hughes Medical Institute investigators
- 38 NIH Innovator and Young Innovator Awards
- 9 members of the Royal Society
- 64 members of the American Academy of Arts and Sciences
- 68 members of the American Association for the Advancement of Science
- 2 Breakthrough Prize in Life Sciences winners
- 4 National Medal of Science winners
- 6 Shaw Prize winners
- 10 Lasker Award winners

=== School of Medicine ===
The UCSF school of medicine is the oldest in the Western United States. In 2021, the School of Medicine was the second-highest recipient of National Institutes of Health research funds among all U.S. medical schools, receiving awards totaling $630 million.

In 2016, the School of Medicine launched the Bridges curriculum, more than half of which is dedicated to diagnostic reasoning.

In 2017, 8,078 people applied and 505 were interviewed for 145 positions in the entering class.

=== Graduate Division ===
The Graduate Division, established in 1961, is home to 1,600 students enrolled in 31 degree programs (both PhD and Masters) and 1,100 postdoctoral scholars. Programs are based basic, translational, clinical, social, and population sciences, and focus on the understanding of the mechanisms of biology, analyzing the social, cultural, and historical determinants of health, alleviating human disease, reducing health disparities, and advancing health worldwide. U.S. News & World Report. In 2018, UCSF graduate programs ranked 1st in immunology and molecular biology, 3rd in neuroscience, 4th in cell biology and biochemistry, fifth in biochemistry/biophysics/structural biology.

=== School of Nursing ===
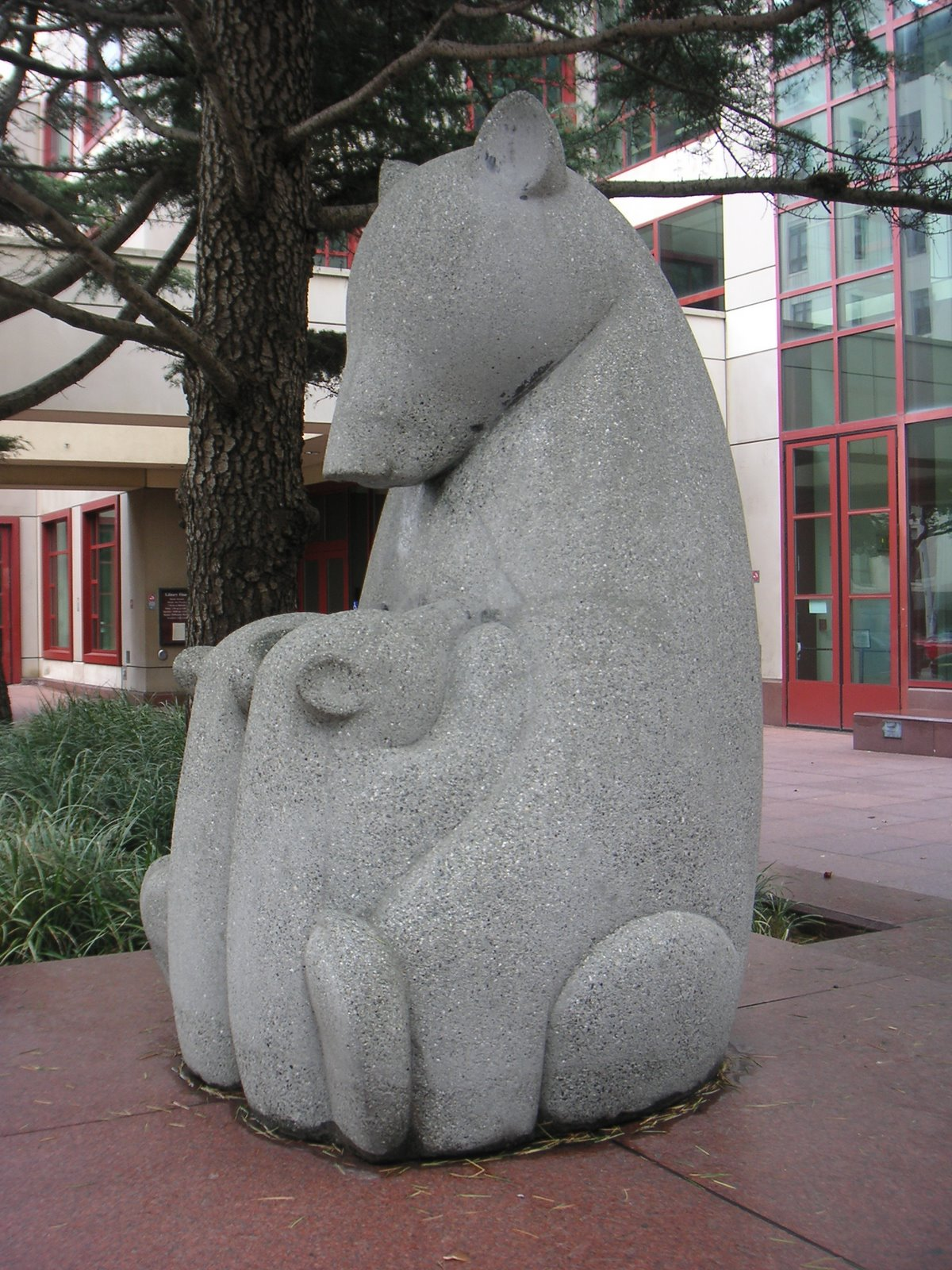
Benny Bufano's Bear and Cub sculpture outside Kalmanovitz Library

The School of Nursing was established in 1907, following the 1906 San Francisco earthquake, which lead to UCSF becoming active in providing health care in San Francisco. It is recognized as one of the premier nursing schools in the United States. In the U.S. News & World Report for 2016, the UCSF School of Nursing tied for 2nd overall in the nation. UCSF also ranked in the top 10 in all six of its rated nursing specialties, including ranking #1 for its psychiatric/mental health nurse practitioner program, and ranking #2 for its family nurse practitioner program. Previously, in 2012, the nursing specialties were ranked as #1 for adult/medical-surgical nurse, family nurse practitioner and psychiatric/mental health nurse programs, and #2 for its adult nurse practitioner program.

The School of Nursing in 2016 ranked first nationally in total NIH research funds with $7.85 million, for the 10th time in the last dozen years. This was the second year in a row that all four of UCSF's professional schools (Medicine, Nursing, Pharmacy, and Dentistry) ranked first for "federal biomedical research funding in their fields".

=== School of Pharmacy ===
Founded in 1872, it is the oldest pharmacy school in California and the western United States. For 39 consecutive years it has been the number one pharmacy school by NIH funding, with close to $29 million in 2018.

In 2015, U.S. News & World Report ranked the UCSF School of Pharmacy number three in its "America's Best Graduate Schools" edition. In 2014, the School of Pharmacy also ranked first in NIH research funding among all US pharmacy schools, receiving awards totaling $31.8 million. The UCSF School of Pharmacy was also ranked as the top program in the US, according to a 2002 survey published in The Annals of Pharmacotherapy, which weighed key criteria, including funding for research and the frequency of scientific publications by faculty, that are not considered in other rankings. In 2013, the UCSF pharmacy program implemented the multiple mini interview, developed by McMaster University Medical School, as a replacement for the more traditional panel interview as the MMI had shown to be a better predictor of subsequent performance in school.

=== School of Dentistry ===
Founded in 1881, the School of Dentistry is the oldest dental school in the state of California and in the Western United States. It is accredited by the American Dental Association and offers the Doctor of Dental Surgery (DDS), PhD in Oral and Craniofacial Sciences, MS in Oral and Craniofacial Sciences, and MS in Dental Hygiene degrees.

The School of Dentistry in 2016 ranked first among all dental schools in NIH research funding for the 25th consecutive year, with $19.5 million in awards. In Quacquarelli Symonds's Dentistry Subject Ranking in 2021, UCSF was ranked 7th in the world and 2nd in the United States.

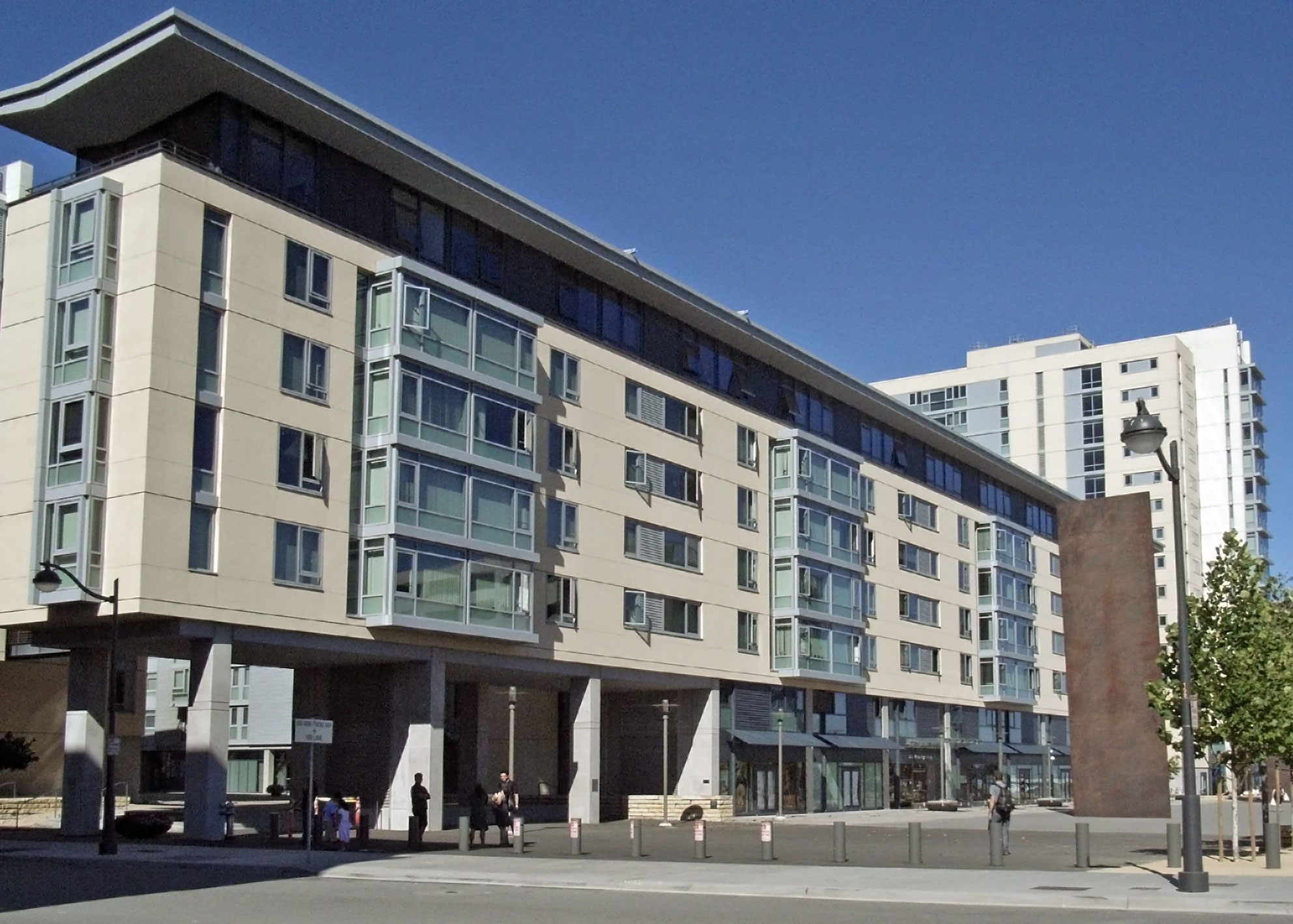
Buildings at the Mission Bay campus

== UCSF Health ==
=== UCSF Medical Center ===
In 2022–23, U.S. News & World Report recognized UCSF Medical Center as the 12th best hospital in the nation and the third best in California. UCSF received the following ranking in 17 adult medical specialities:

Student Demographics as of Fall 2023
| Race and ethnicity | Total |
|---|---|
| Asian | 32% |
| White | 26% |
| Hispanic | 16% |
| U.S. Nonresident | 10% |
| Black | 7% |
| Two or more races | 6% |
| Unknown | 3% |

| Specialty | Ranking |
|---|---|
| Anesthesiology | 1 |
| Cancer | 15 |
| Cardiology and Heart Surgery | 37 |
| Diabetes and Endocrinology | 6 |
| Ear, nose, and throat (otolaryngology) | 6 |
| Gastroenterology and GI surgery | 22 |
| Geriatrics | 9 |
| Nephrology | Not Ranked |
| Neurology and Neurosurgery | 2 |
| Obstetrics and Gynecology | 39 |
| Ophthalmology | 9 |
| Orthopedics | 24 |
| Psychiatry | 5 |
| Pulmonology and Lung Surgery | 9 |
| Rehabilitation | Not Ranked |
| Rheumatology | 8 |
| Urology | 17 |

The UCSF Medical Center at Mission Bay opened February 1, 2015 and hosts three hospitals (UCSF Benioff children's hospital, UCSF Betty Irene Moore Women's Hospital, and UCSF Bakar Cancer Hospital) and an outpatient facility.

== Research ==
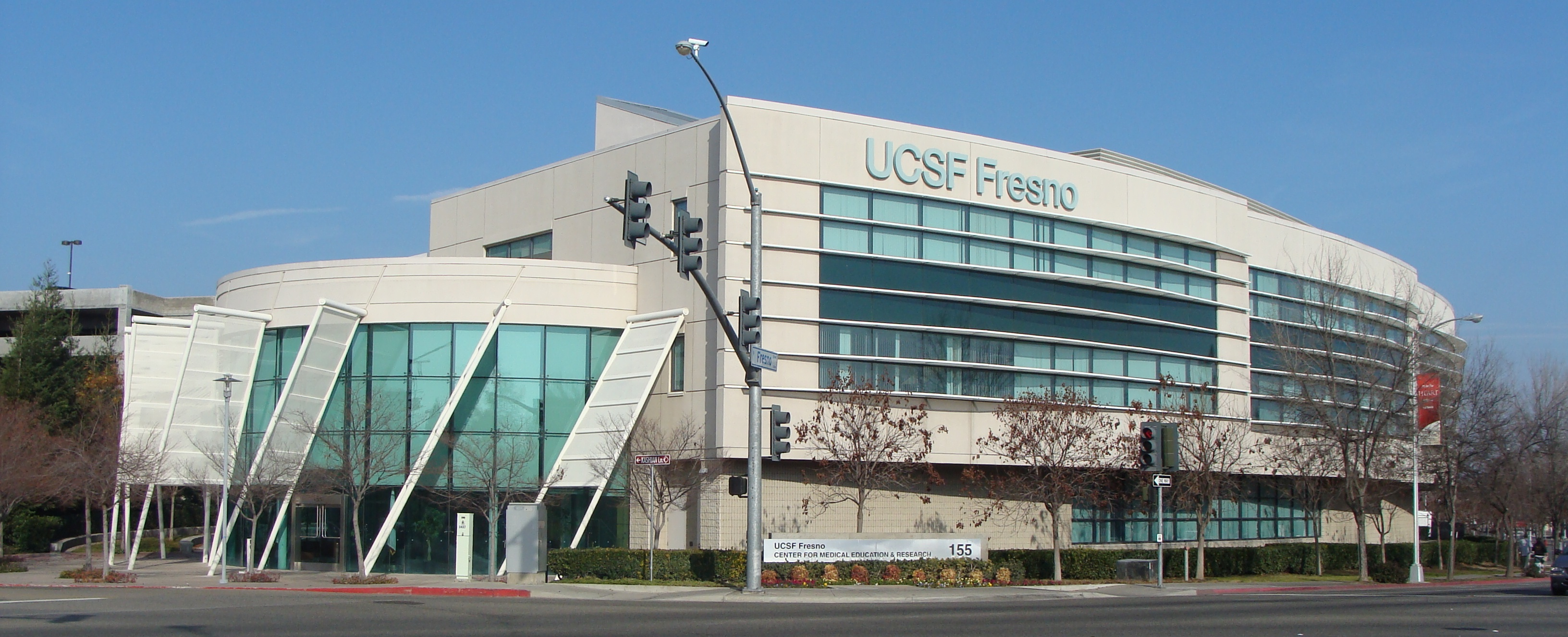
UCSF Fresno

UCSF is among the world's leading institutions in biological and medical research. Its departments span all fields of biomedical science, from basic to translational sciences. In fiscal year 2021, it spent $1.71 billion in research and development, the second most among institutions of higher education in the U.S. In fiscal year 2020, UCSF received $680 million in funding from the National Institutes of Health, which is the 2nd highest of all US domestic higher education universities.

Milestones include:

- The discovery of oncogenes and the conversion of normal cellular genes can be converted to cancer genes (Nobel Prize in Medicine, J. Michael Bishop and Harold Varmus, 1989)
- The techniques of recombinant DNA, the seminal step in the creation of the biotechnology industry, together with Stanford
- The precise recombinant DNA techniques that led to the creation of a hepatitis B vaccine
- The first successful in-utero fetal surgery (Michael R. Harrison)
- First to clone an insulin gene into bacteria, leading to the mass production of recombinant human insulin to treat diabetes
- First to synthesize human growth hormone and clone into bacteria, setting the stage for genetically engineered human growth hormone
- First to develop prenatal tests for sickle cell anemia and thalassemia
- Discovery of prions, a unique type of infectious agent responsible for a variety of neurodegenerative diseases (Nobel Prize in Medicine, Stanley B. Prusiner, 1997)
- Development of catheter ablation therapy for tachycardia
- Discovery of the molecular nature of telomeres
- Discovery that missing pulmonary surfactants are responsible for the death of newborns with respiratory distress syndrome; first to develop a synthetic substitute for it, reducing infant death rates significantly
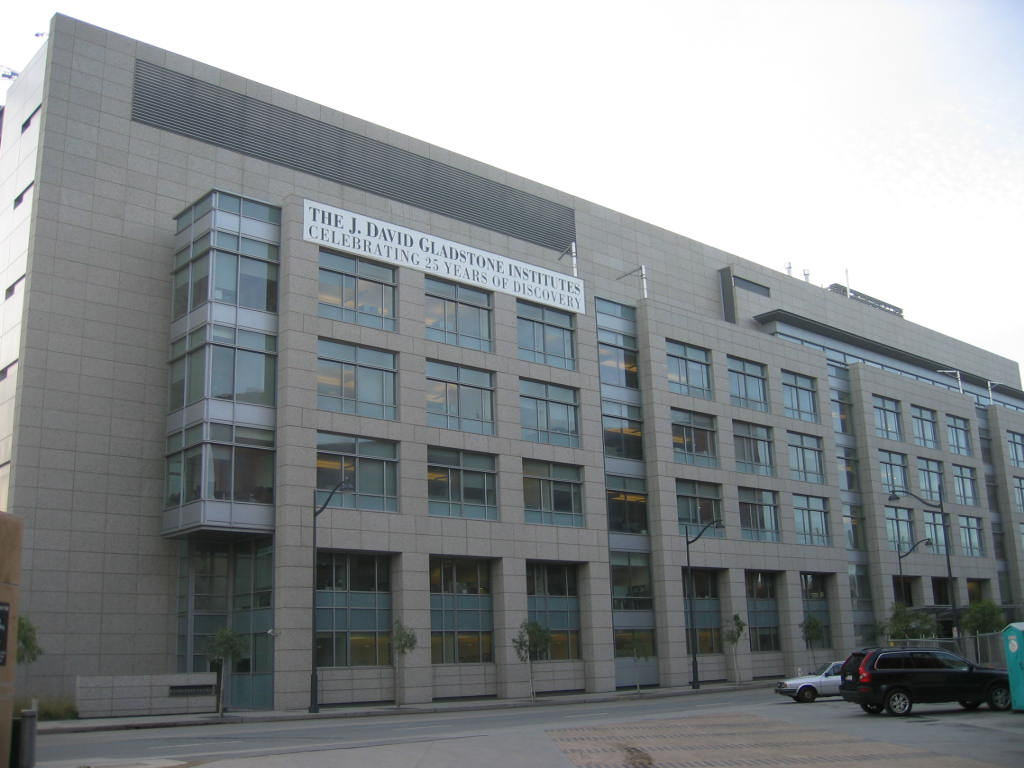
  The Gladstone Institutes, a partner research institute on the Mission Bay campus
- The first care units for AIDS patients and pioneer work in treatment of AIDS
- First to train pharmacists as drug therapy specialists
- First university west of the Mississippi to offer a doctoral degree in nursing
- First to develop an academic hospitalist program (and coined the term "hospitalist") (Robert M. Wachter)
- First high volume HIV counseling and testing program at the UCSF Alliance Health Project
- On June 5, 2015, surgeons at UCSF and California Pacific Medical Center successfully completed 18 surgeries in the nation's first nine-way, two-day kidney transplant chain in a single city.

== Student life ==
There are 230 registered campus organizations at UCSF. These groups and clubs cover a broad range of interests, including educational, social, cultural, artistic, recreational, political and spiritual. Every year, these organizations sponsor more than 1,200 activities and events.

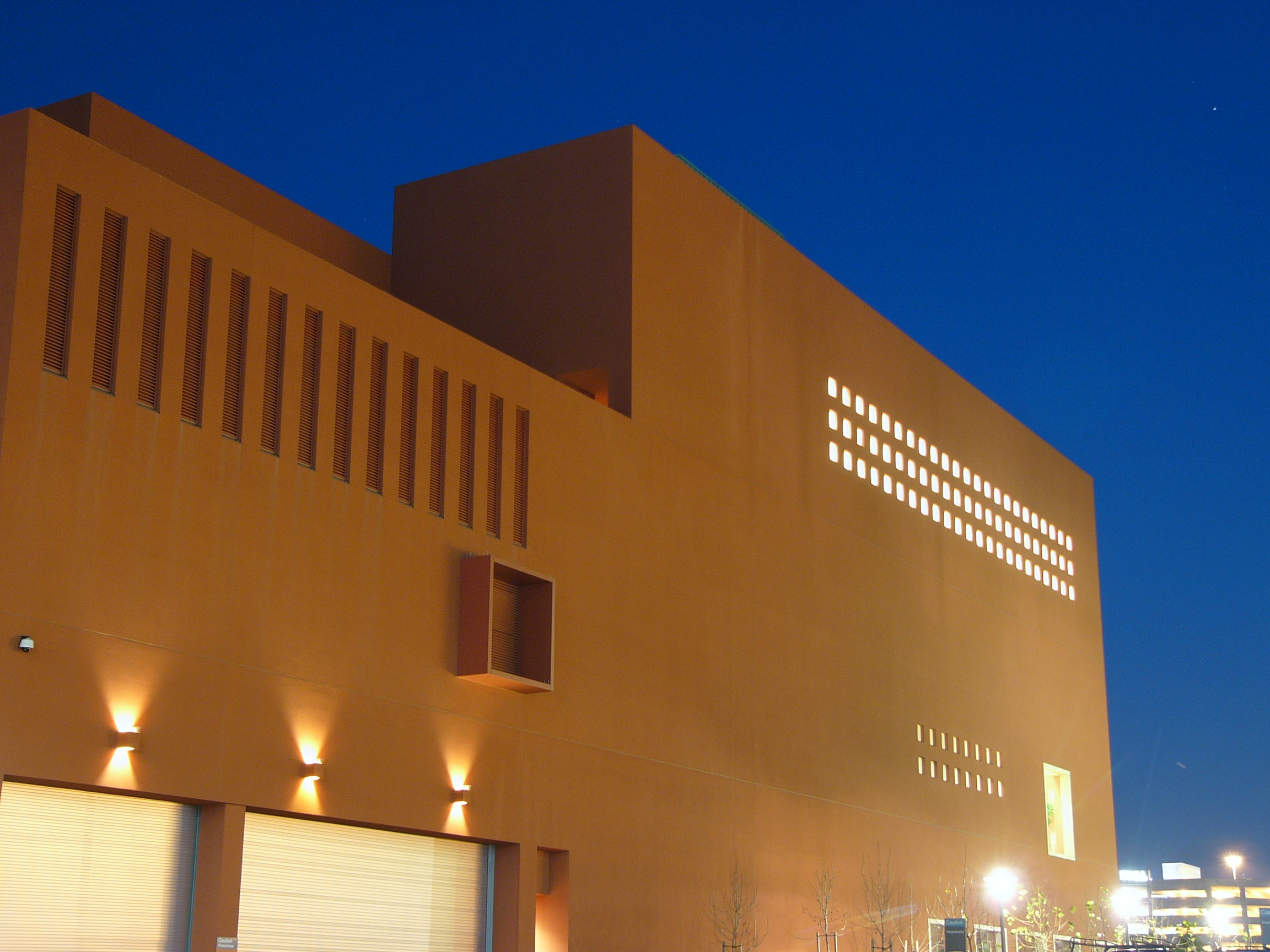
The Rutter Community Center, which serves as the hub of student life in the Mission Bay campus

The student government at UCSF consists of the Graduate and Professional Student Association (GPSA), which serves the collective interests of graduate and professional students. It aims at improving student life on a university and system-wide level with dialogue, action, and activities between students, faculty, and staff. It focuses on discussing University policy, informing constituents, advocating student interests, fostering relationships between academic programs, strengthening connections to better support students, and initiating actions and proposals.

Synapse is the student newspaper at UCSF. It was founded in 1957, and since 1997 the newspaper has been both in print and online. In the fall 2015 the newspaper rebranded from Synapse: The UCSF Newspaper to Synapse: UCSF Student Voices. The mission of Synapse is to serve as the forum for the campus community, and it covers campus news and events, entertainment, and restaurant reviews, and a wide range of feature stories, editorials, and weekly columns, to the entire UCSF community. The newspaper focuses heavily on science and health, but it also covers arts, national news, and opinion articles.

UCSF students are eligible to become University of California student regent, a position on the University of California Board of Regents created by a 1974 California ballot proposition to represent University of California students on the university system's governing board. Student regents serve an approximately one-year term as 'student regent-designate', followed by a one-year term as a full voting member of the Regents. Virtually any UC student in good academic standing may apply to be student regent. Traditionally, the position alternates between undergraduate and graduate students as well as between the various UC campuses.

== Notable people ==
=== List of chancellors ===
The following persons led UCSF as chancellor:

| No. | Portrait | Chancellor | Term start | Term end | Refs. |
|---|---|---|---|---|---|
| 1 | | John Bertrand deCusance Morant Saunders (Note: Previously served as Provost from 1958 to 1964 when that position was the chief administrator for the school.) | January 1964 | June 30, 1966 | |
| 2 | | Willard Fleming | July 1, 1966 | June 30, 1969 | |
| 3 | | Philip Randolph Lee | July 1, 1969 | October 1, 1972 | |
| acting | | Francis A. Sooy | October 1, 1972 | December 1, 1972 | |
| 4 | | Francis A. Sooy | December 1, 1972 | June 30, 1982 | |
| 5 | | Julius R. Krevans | July 1, 1982 | May 19, 1993 | |
| 6 | | Joseph B. Martin | June 1, 1993 | June 30, 1997 | |
| 7 | | Haile Debas | July 1, 1997 | June 30, 1998 | |
| 8 | | J. Michael Bishop | July 1, 1998 | June 30, 2009 | |
| 9 | | Susan Desmond-Hellmann | August 3, 2009 | March 31, 2014 | |
| interim | | Sam Hawgood | April 1, 2014 | July 17, 2014 | |
| 10 | | Sam Hawgood | July 17, 2014 | present | |

Table notes:

=== Notable alumni and faculty ===
- Nadav Ahituv, director for the institute for human genetics
- Bruce Alberts, 2016 Albert Lasker Special Achievement Award for fundamental discoveries in DNA replication and protein biochemistry, 2012 National Medal of Science
- James P. Allison, 2018 Nobel laureate for the discovery of cancer therapy by inhibition of negative immune regulation
- Andy Baldwin, bachelor for the tenth season of The Bachelor
- Carolyn Bertozzi, Nobel laureate, known for the development of click chemistry and bioorthogonal chemistry
- J. Michael Bishop, former UCSF Chancellor. Nobel laureate in Medicine (1989), worked to discover the cellular origin of retroviral oncogenes
- Elizabeth Blackburn, professor of biology and physiology at UCSF, Nobel laureate in Medicine (2009), discoverer of the ribonucleoprotein enzyme, telomerase. Appointed a member of the President's Council on Bioethics in 2001 and fired in February 2004, reportedly for her public disagreements and political differences with Council chair Leon Kass and the Bush Administration, particularly on the issue of therapeutic cloning
- Herbert Boyer, National Medal of Science (1990) and Shaw prize 2004, cofounder of Genentech
- Benjamin Breyer, professor of Urology, Epidemiology, and Biostatistics
- Enoch Callaway, psychiatrist, co-founder of the American College of Neuropsychopharmacology and Neurobiological Technologies
- Robin Carhart-Harris, British psychopharmacologist researching psychoactive and psychedelic drugs
- Richard Carmona, former Surgeon General of the United States
- Priscilla Chan, pediatrician, spouse of Facebook CEO Mark Zuckerberg
- John Allen Clements, first to isolate pulmonary surfactant and to develop it artificially
- Terence Coderre, professor of Medicine and the Harold Griffith Chair in Anaesthesia Research at McGill University
- Eric Coleman is an American geriatrician and professor at the University of Colorado. His research concerns care transitions. Coleman was awarded a MacArthur Fellowship in 2012.
- Lindsey A. Criswell, rheumatologist and director of the National Institute of Arthritis and Musculoskeletal and Skin Diseases.
- Mary Croughan, epidemiologist and provost of University of California, Davis
- Zubin Damania, physician, comedian, internet personality, musician, and founder of Turntable Health
- Haile T. Debas, former UCSF Chancellor; former Dean, School of Medicine; founding Executive Director, Department of Global Health Sciences
- Joseph DeRisi biochemist, specializing in molecular biology, parasitology, genomics, virology, and computational biology. In 2004 was named a MacArthur Fellow, in 2008 was awarded the 14th Annual Heinz Award for Technology, the Economy, and Employment, in 2014 he received the John J. Carty Award for the Advancement of Science from the National Academy of Sciences, and in 2016 he was elected to the National Academy of Sciences
- Michael V. Drake, former University of California, Irvine Chancellor; former University of California Vice President-Health Affairs; former president of Ohio State University; current president of the University of California
- Jennifer Doudna, adjunct professor of cellular and molecular pharmacology, Nobel laureate in Chemistry (2020)
- Laura J. Esserman, surgeon and breast cancer oncology specialist, named in Time's 100 most influential people in the world in 2016.
- Paul Ekman, psychologist who showed that human emotional expressions were universal and developed the Facial Action Coding System
- Richard Feachem, founding Executive Director of the Global Fund to Fight AIDS, Tuberculosis and Malaria (2002–2007)
- Faith Thayer Fitzgerald, UC Davis chief of general medicine and winner of multiple teaching awards
- Courtney Fitzhugh, physician and laboratory director at the National Heart, Lung, and Blood Institute
- Diana E. Forsythe, anthropologist noted for her work on artificial intelligence and medical informatics
- Julie Gerberding, Director, Centers for Disease Control and Prevention (CDC)
- Stanton Glantz, anti-big-tobacco activist
- Joseph Goldyne, M.D., fine artist, printmaker, painter, curator.
- Jere E. Goyan, former commissioner of the U.S. Food and Drug Administration
- Walter S. Graf, cardiologist, pioneer in creation of emergency paramedic care system
- Geoffrey C. Gurtner, microsurgeon, researcher and medical academic
- Victoria Hale, both alumna and professor, founded the nonprofit pharmaceutical company The Institute for OneWorld Health, 2006 MacArthur Fellow
- Jeffry B. Lansman is a neuroscientist, Professor Emeritus of Cellular and Molecular Pharmacology
- Joseph Gilbert Hamilton, Hamilton studied the medical effects of exposure to radioactive isotopes, which included the use of unsuspecting human subjects
- Eva Harris, professor in the School of Public Health at the University of California, Berkeley, and the founder and president of the Sustainable Sciences Institute. Research efforts focused on combating diseases that primarily afflict people in developing nations; 1997 MacArthur Fellows Program
- Michael R. Harrison, developed the initial techniques for fetal surgery and performed the first fetal surgery in 1981, and then went on to establish the UCSF Fetal Treatment Center, which was the first of its kind in the United States
- Griffith R. Harsh, vice chair of the Stanford Department of Neurosurgery and the director of the Stanford Brain Tumor Center. He is also the spouse of Meg Whitman.
- Ira Herskowitz, geneticist, noted for his work on cellular differentiation, 1987 MacArthur Fellows Program
- Julien Hoffman, professor emeritus of pediatrics; senior member of the Cardiovascular Research Institute
- Dorothy M. Horstmann (1911–2001), virologist who made important discoveries about polio.
- Nola Hylton, radiologist and pioneer in the use of Breast MRI
- Janet Iwasa, cell biologist and animator
- David Julius, physiologist known for his work on molecular mechanisms underlying detection of thermal stimuli and natural products. Received the 2010 Shaw Prize, 2017 Gairdner Award, 2020 Breakthrough Prize in Life Sciences, 2020 Kavli Prize in neuroscience, 2021 Nobel Prize in Physiology or Medicine.
- Sarah H. Kagan, American gerontological nurse and Lucy Walker Honorary Term Professor of Gerontological Nursing at the University of Pennsylvania. She is a MacArthur Fellow.
- Yuet Wai Kan, Lasker Award (1991) and Shaw Prize (2004)
- Selna Kaplan, former professor of pediatrics; pediatric endocrinologist
- Stuart Kauffman, American medical doctor, theoretical biologist, and complex systems researcher who studies the origin of life on Earth. He was a professor the University of Chicago, University of Pennsylvania, and University of Calgary. He has a number of awards including a MacArthur Fellowship and a Wiener Medal.
- C. Henry Kempe, M.D., pediatrician who was the first to identify and recognize child abuse
- Uzma Khanum, sister of Pakistani Politician Imran Khan
- David Kessler, former dean of the UCSF School of Medicine and Yale University School of Medicine, and former Commissioner of the Food and Drug Administration in the Clinton Administration
- Peter Kollman, developer of the AMBER force field in molecular dynamics simulation and an internationally renowned computational chemist
- Arthur Lander, M.D. PhD Developmental biologist at University of California, Irvine
- Jeanne LaBerge, M.D., Interventional radiologist
- Marguerita Lightfoot, Professor of Medicine and Chief of Prevention Science,
- Bernadette Lim, American physician, community organizer, founder of the Freedom Community Clinic in Oakland, CA
- Jay A. Levy, research physician who, along with Robert Gallo at the National Cancer Institute and Luc Montagnier at the Pasteur Institute, was among the first to identify and isolate HIV as the causative agent in AIDS
- Richard Locksley, medical doctor, professor and researcher of infectious diseases at the University of California, San Francisco
- Michael Marletta, Ch and Annie Li Chair in the Molecular Biology of Diseases at the University of California, Berkeley. 1995 MacArthur Fellow.
- C. Cameron Macauley, photographer and film producer
- Wendy Max, professor of Health Economics
- Michael Merzenich, Professor emeritus neuroscientist, brain plasticity research, basic and clinical sciences of hearing pioneer, CEO Scientific Learning, Posit Science
- Dean Ornish, who first established that coronary artery disease could be reversed with lifestyle changes alone, author of the few bestseller books on the subject of healthy lifestyle choices
- Laura Otis, American historian of science, and professor of English, at Emory University, 2000 MacArthur Fellows Program
- Ardem Patapoutian, Nobel Prize laureate known for his work in characterizing the PIEZO1, PIEZO2, and TRPM8 receptors
- William W. Parmley, former editor of the Journal of the American College of Cardiology and general authority of the Church of Jesus Christ of Latter-day Saints
- Stanley Prusiner, Nobel laureate in Medicine (1997), discovered and described prions
- Shuvo Roy, inventor of artificial kidney
- William Seeley, alumni, neurology professor at UCSFv, where he leads the Selective Vulnerability Research Lab. He is a 2011 MacArthur Fellow.
- Steve Schroeder, former CEO, Robert Wood Johnson Foundation
- Michelle Tam, creator of Nom Nom Paleo and James Beard Foundation Award nominated cookbook author, blogger, and food writer
- Julie Theriot, microbiologist, professor at the Stanford University School of Medicine, and heads the Theriot Lab. She was a Predoctoral Fellow, and Investigator at the Howard Hughes Medical Institute, 2004 MacArthur Fellows Program
- Thea Tlsty, professor of pathology, known for her research in cancer biology
- Kay Tye, neuroscientist
- Harold Varmus, Nobel laureate in Medicine (1989), worked with J. Michael Bishop to discover the cellular origin of retroviral oncogenes. Also served as director of the National Institutes of Health during the Clinton Administration, as president of Memorial Sloan-Kettering Cancer Center from 2000 to 2010, and currently as the director of the National Cancer Institute.
- Paul Volberding, whose pioneering work in the early days of the AIDS pandemic was noted in Randy Shilts's book And the Band Played On
- Robert M. Wachter, a prominent expert in patient safety, who coined the term hospitalist and is considered the academic leader of the field of hospital medicine. Wachter is now chair of UCSF's Department of Medicine.
- Peter Walter, molecular biologist and biochemist, Shaw Prize (2014) and Lasker Award (2014)
- Ted Wong, United States Army Major General, Chief of the U.S. Army Dental Corps (2011–2014)
- Ronald Vale, biochemist who has received the Lasker Award (2012) and the Shaw Prize (2017)
- Pablo DT Valenzuela, co-founder of the American biotech company Chiron Corporation, the first Chilean biotech company Bios Chile, and of Fundacion Ciencia para la Vida in Santiago Chile.
- V. Sasisekharan, proposed an alternate model for the Watson-Crick double helix
- Kimberly Tanner, professor at San Francisco State University
- Eric M. Verdin, fifth President and Chief Executive Officer of the Buck Institute for Research on Aging
- George Whipple, Nobel Prize in Physiology or Medicine in 1934 for discoveries concerning liver therapy in cases of anemia.
- Rachel Wilson, professor of neurobiology at Harvard Medical School, 2008 MacArthur Fellow
- Shinya Yamanaka, who developed for reprogramming adult cells to pluripotential precursors, thus circumventing an approach in which embryos would be destroyed. Yamanaka won Shaw prize in 2008 and the Nobel prize for Medicine in 2012.
- Keith Yamamoto, UCSF's first vice chancellor for Science Policy and Strategy and director of UCSF Precision Medicine; the leading researcher investigating transcriptional regulation by nuclear receptors.
