= C17H27NO2 =

The molecular formula C_{17}H_{27}NO_{2} (molar mass: 277.40 g/mol, exact mass: 277.204179 u) may refer to:

- ICI-118,551
- Padimate O
- PNU-99,194
- RDS-127
- Venlafaxine
