= Nola Hylton =

Radiologist

- Born: 1957 (age 68–69); Mount Vernon
- Education: Massachusetts Institute of Technology; Stanford University
- Known for: Breast MRI
- Scientific career
- Workplaces: University of California, San Francisco

Nola M. Hylton (born 1957) is an American oncologist who is Professor of Radiology and Director of the Breast Imaging Research Group at the University of California, San Francisco. She pioneered the usage of magnetic resonance imaging for the detection, diagnosis, and staging of breast cancer by using MRIs to locate tumors and characterize the surrounding tissue.

== Early life and education ==
Hylton was born in Mount Vernon, New York in 1957. Hylton also studied in Mount Vernon, where she was one of the only Black students in her physics class. Hylton studied chemical engineering at Massachusetts Institute of Technology in 1979. She was an undergraduate fellow at Bell Labs in 1975. She joined Stanford University for her PhD, earning a doctorate in applied physics in 1985, and becoming one of a handful of Black women with doctorates in that period. At Stanford, she worked on analytical techniques to evaluate NMR imaging contrast, which is used in assessing MRIs. She developed hierarchical processing algorithms to characterise the tissues. In her early career she was part of an international trial that compared two breast cancer screening methods, using MRI and mammographies. Hylton was appointed group leader of the working group on Breast MRI systems.

== Research and career ==
Nola Hylton played an integral role in the development of MRI technology for the detection and diagnosis of breast cancer. She was among the first group of scholars named the Susan G. Komen for the Cure’s Scientific Advisory Council and co-leader for the U.S. Department of Health and Human Services’ Women’s Health International Group, where she identified and addressed barriers to clinical dissemination of breast MRI.

Hylton designs MRI biomarkers, which allow her to evaluate how breast cancer responds to treatment. In the 2013 Investigation of Serial studies to Predict Your Therapeutic Response with Imaging And molecular analysis (I-SPY TRIAL), Hylton developed workstations that allow physicians to perform analyses of breast MRI scans. Hylton worked with Hologic to develop software to measure the volume of tumours and analyse images automatically. She expanded the software to include diffusion-weighted imaging (DW-MRI), which helps assess the response of tumours in patients undergoing preoperative chemotherapy. She was principal investigator for ACRIN 6657 and 6698 (I-SPY 2).

She is particularly interested in dynamic contrast-enhanced magnetic resonance imaging (DCE-MRI). The hologic software DCE-MRI allowed Hylton to monitor breast cancer response in real time. The software was FDA IDE approved in 2010. Hylton demonstrated in 2010 that MRI could be used to predict how women will respond to neoadjuvant therapy. DCE-MRI and DW-MRI provide extra functional information as the MRI becomes sensitive to the vascularity of tumours. Additionally, her recent work has identified that PET and MRI can be used to personalise the treatment of breast cancer.

Hylton served as the principal investigator for the National Cancer Institute's International Breast MRI Consortium. She serves on the University of California, San Francisco Diversity and Inclusion committee.

== Selected publications ==
- Laura Esserman, Nola Hylton, Leila Yassa, John Barclay, Steven Frankel, Edward Sickles. (1999). "Utility of magnetic resonance imaging in the management of breast cancer: evidence for improved preoperative staging." Journal of Clinical Oncology 17 (1): 110-110.
- David A Bluemke, Constantine A Gatsonis, Mei Hsiu Chen, Gia A DeAngelis, Nanette DeBruhl, Steven Harms, Sylvia H Heywang-Köbrunner, Nola Hylton, Christiane K Kuhl, Constance Lehman, Etta D Pisano, Petrina Causer, Stuart J Schnitt, Stanley F Smazal, Carol B Stelling, Paul T Weatherall, Mitchell D Schnall. (2004). "Magnetic resonance imaging of the breast prior to biopsy." Jama 292 (22): 2735-2742.
- Constance D Lehman, Jeffrey D Blume, Paul Weatherall, David Thickman, Nola Hylton, Ellen Warner, Etta Pisano, Stuart J Schnitt, Constantine Gatsonis, Mitchell Schnall, International Breast MRI Consortium Working Group. (2005). "Screening women at high risk for breast cancer with mammography and magnetic resonance imaging." Cancer 103 (9): 1898-1905.
- Mitchell D Schnall, Jeffrey Blume, David A Bluemke, Gia A DeAngelis, Nanette DeBruhl, Steven Harms, Sylvia H Heywang-Kobrunner, Nola Hylton, Christiane K Kuhl, Etta D Pisano, Petrina Causer, Stuart J Schnitt, David Thickman, Carol B Stelling, Paul T Weatherall, Constance Lehman, Constantine A Gatsonis. (2006). "Diagnostic Architectural and Dynamic Features at Breast MR Imaging: Multicenter Study." Radiology 238 (1): 42-53.
- Nola Hylton. (2006). "Dynamic contrast-enhanced magnetic resonance imaging as an imaging biomarker." Journal of Clinical Oncology 24 (20): 3293-3298.
- AD Barker, CC Sigman, GJ Kelloff, NM Hylton, DA Berry, LJ Esserman. (2009). "I‐SPY 2: an adaptive breast cancer trial design in the setting of neoadjuvant chemotherapy." Clinical Pharmacology & Therapeutics 86 (1): 97-100.
- Laura J Esserman, Donald A Berry, Angela DeMichele, Lisa Carey, Sarah E Davis, Meredith Buxton, Cliff Hudis, Joe W Gray, Charles Perou, Christina Yau, Chad Livasy, Helen Krontiras, Leslie Montgomery, Debasish Tripathy, Constance Lehman, Minetta C Liu, Olufunmilayo I Olopade, Hope S Rugo, John T Carpenter, Lynn Dressler, David Chhieng, Baljit Singh, Carolyn Mies, Joseph Rabban, Yunn-Yi Chen, Dilip Giri, Laura Van't Veer, Nola Hylton. (2012). "Pathologic complete response predicts recurrence-free survival more effectively by cancer subset: results from the I-SPY 1 TRIAL—CALGB 150007/150012, ACRIN 6657." Journal of Clinical Oncology 30 (26): 3242.
- Hope S Rugo, Olufunmilayo I Olopade, Angela DeMichele, Christina Yau, Laura J van’t Veer, Meredith B Buxton, Michael Hogarth, Nola M Hylton, Melissa Paoloni, Jane Perlmutter, W Fraser Symmans, Douglas Yee, A Jo Chien, Anne M Wallace, Henry G Kaplan, Judy C Boughey, Tufia C Haddad, Kathy S Albain, Minetta C Liu, Claudine Isaacs, Qamar J Khan, Julie E Lang, Rebecca K Viscusi, Lajos Pusztai, Stacy L Moulder, Stephen Y Chui, Kathleen A Kemmer, Anthony D Elias, Kirsten K Edmiston, David M Euhus, Barbara B Haley, Rita Nanda, Donald W Northfelt, Debasish Tripathy, William C Wood, Cheryl Ewing, Richard Schwab, Julia Lyandres, Sarah E Davis, Gillian L Hirst, Ashish Sanil, Donald A Berry, Laura J Esserman. (2016). "Adaptive randomization of veliparib–carboplatin treatment in breast cancer." New England Journal of Medicine 375 (1): 23-34.

== Awards and honors ==
- 2003 American Cancer Society Research Scholar
- 2003 American College of Radiology Outstanding Contribution Award
- 2010 Komen Cure Scholar Award
- 2010 Susan G. Komen for the Cure Scientific Advisory Council
- 2013 Academy of Radiology Research Distinguished Investigator
- 2017 International Society for Magnetic Resonance in Medicine Fellow
- 2018 National Society of Black Physicists Honoree
- 2019 Society of Breast Imaging Honorary Fellow
- 2024 Member, National Academy of Medicine
