= Jeanne LaBerge =

Interventional radiologist

Jeanne LaBerge is American interventional radiologist known for her work establishing the field of interventional radiology as a primary specialty in medicine. She was named a fellow of the Society of CardioVascular and Interventional Radiology in 1992.

== Education and career ==
LaBerge received her M.S. from Stanford University in 1976. She then obtained her medical degree from the University of Utah School of Medicine in 1980. She completed her diagnostic radiology residency at the University of California, San Francisco in 1984 and did a fellowship in angiography and interventional radiology at University of California, San Francisco which she completed in 1985. LaBerge served as the head of Interventional Radiology at Tripler Army Medical Center in Honolulu, HI from 1985 to 1989 and concurrently served as assistant clinical professor at the University of Hawaii in Honolulu from 1986 to 1989. She then moved to the University of California, San Francisco where she was promoted to professor in 2000. In 2019, LaBerge became an emeritus professor.

She helped pioneer the designation of interventional radiology as a primary specialty in 2012 which altered the certification and training of interventional radiologists. She also led the effort to develop the new residency in interventional radiology within the Accreditation Council for Graduate Medical Education in 2012. In research, LaBerge is most known for her work on portal hypertension and transjugular intrahepatic portosystemic shunts (TIPS). Her book on Interventional radiology essentials was reviewed by other publications.

== Selected publications ==
- Laberge, Jeanne M.; Somberg, Kenneth A.; Lake, John R.; Gordon, Roy L.; Kerlan, Robert K.; Ascher, Nancy L.; Roberts, John P.; Simor, Margaret M.; Doherty, Catherine A.; Hahn, Judith; BachettiI, Peter (1995). "Two-year outcome following transjugular intrahepatic portosystemic shunt for variceal bleeding: Results in 90 patients". Gastroenterology. 108 (4): 1143–1151. doi:10.1016/0016-5085(95)90213-9. ISSN 0016-5085. PMID 7698582.
- LaBerge, J M; Ring, E J; Gordon, R L; Lake, J R; Doherty, M M; Somberg, K A; Roberts, J P; Ascher, N L (1993-05-01). "Creation of transjugular intrahepatic portosystemic shunts with the wallstent endoprosthesis: results in 100 patients". Radiology. 187 (2): 413–420. doi:10.1148/radiology.187.2.8475283. ISSN 0033-8419. PMID 8475283.
- Interventional radiology essentials. Jeanne M. LaBerge. Philadelphia: Lippincott Williams & Wilkins. 2000. ISBN 0-7817-2010-9. OCLC 43947911.

== Awards ==
She was selected as the fellow of the year through the Society of CardioVascular and Interventional Radiology in 1992. She delivered the Society of Interventional Radiology's Charles Dotter Award in 2011, and in 2017 she received the Gold Medal from the Society for Interventional Radiology.
