= University of California, San Francisco Fetal Treatment Center =

Treatment center for birth defects

Coordinates: 37°45′47.2″N 122°27′27.3″W

The Fetal Treatment Center at the University of California, San Francisco is a multidisciplinary care center dedicated to the diagnosis, treatment, and long-term follow-up of fetal birth defects. It combines the talents of specialists in pediatric surgery, genetics, obstetrics/perinatology, radiology, nursing, and neonatal medicine.

== History ==
In 1980, Dr. Michael R. Harrison and research colleagues at UCSF developed the techniques for open fetal surgery using animal models. Then in 1981, Harrison conducted the first open fetal surgery on a fetus to correct a dangerously advanced urinary tract obstruction.

Under the direction of Harrison, the newly created Fetal Treatment Center continued to develop and further refine fetal intervention techniques to treat a range of birth defects. It has also striven to develop less invasive means of treatment such as fetendo and fetal image-guided surgery.

Dr. Hanmin Lee M.D. is the current director for the UCSF Fetal Treatment Center, replacing Harrison, who is now director emeritus.

== Clinical services ==
The Fetal Treatment Center specializes in the diagnosis and treatment of fetal birth defects:

- Agenesis of the corpus callosum
- Amniotic band syndrome
- Bowel obstructions
- Congenital cystic adenomatoid malformation
- Congenital diaphragmatic hernia (CDH)
- Congenital heart disease
- Fetal anemia & thrombocytopenia
- Gastroschisis
- Inherited Genetic diseases treatable with Stem Cells
- Spina bifida (myelomeningocele)
- Omphalocele
- Pulmonary sequestration
- Sacrococcygeal teratoma
- Twin pregnancy complications
  - Twin-to-twin transfusion syndrome (TTTS)
  - TRAP sequence (acardiac twin)
  - Unequal placenta sharing
- Urinary tract obstruction
- Ventriculomegaly

== Research ==
The first open fetal surgery in the world was performed at UCSF in the 1990s.

Clinical research includes a randomized clinical trial comparing prenatal surgical repair of myelomeningocele to standard postnatal care. This trial, Management of Myelomeningocele Study (MOMS) trial, is a three-center study (UCSF, Children's Hospital of Philadelphia, Vanderbilt University Medical Center) supported by the National Institutes of Health. The Fetal Treatment Center is also currently investigating determine whether steroids might be effective in helping fetuses with large microcystic Congenital cystic adenomatoid malformation (CCAM).

Experimental research continues in the laboratory on a variety of potentially curable fetal diseases and the development of new smaller and better minimally invasive techniques.
