= Benjamin Breyer =

American urologic surgeon

Academic background
- Education: BS, Cell and Structural Biology, 1999, University of Illinois at Urbana–Champaign; MD, 2003, Pritzker School of Medicine; MAS, 2011, University of California, San Francisco

Benjamin N. Breyer is an American urologic surgeon. As a Professor of Urology, Epidemiology, and Biostatistics at the University of California, San Francisco, he specializes in complex urethral and penile reconstruction, male incontinence, male fistula, surgical treatment for erectile dysfunction. He was appointed chair of the department of urology at UCSF in June 2023.

== Early life and education ==
Breyer completed his Bachelor of Science degree in Cell and Structural Biology from the University of Illinois at Urbana–Champaign and his Medical Degree from the Pritzker School of Medicine. He earned a Master of Science Degree in Clinical Research from the University of California, San Francisco.

== Career ==
After completing his residency and fellowship at University of California, San Francisco (UCSF), Breyer joined the faculty of Urology in 2011. Breyer's research focuses on genitourinary reconstruction particularly urethral stricture disease, trauma, sexual medicine, and health disparities. His research has had support from the National Institutes of Health, the Department of Defense and Foundation support. Breyer is a Past President of the Trauma Urologic Reconstructive Network of Surgeons, a collaborative research group focused on genitourinary reconstruction and trauma, Breyer's research group has published over 300 peer-reviewed papers and scholarly works.

In his first year as an assistant professor, he collaborated with Michael Eisenberg to use "Google Insights for Search" to see if the varying popularity of search terms would reflect seasonal and geographic differences in kidney stone prevalence. The following year, Breyer led the largest study looking at major and minor "genitourinary" injuries amongst 142,144 U.S. adults went to emergency rooms from injuries caused by clothing, furniture, tools and toys between 2002 and 2010. He followed up this study in 2019 by using GoFundMe to study the most popular crowdfunding projects on the website. His research team found that cancer patients raise approximately a quarter of their goal of $10,000 using GoFundMe.

By 2014, Breyer was appointed chief of urology at San Francisco General Hospital, succeeding Jack W. McAninch, his mentor and fellowship director. In addition to his role as chief, Breyer continued to direct the UCSF male genitourinary reconstruction and trauma surgery fellowship. According to ExpertScape, Breyer is one of the top experts in urethral stricture disease and treatment worldwide.

During the COVID-19 pandemic in North America, Breyer was named Residency Program Director and Associate Chair of Education for the Department of Urology.
