= Michelle Tam =

American food blogger and author (born 1974)

- Born: September 20, 1974 (age 51); Redwood City, California, U.S.
- Education: University of California, Berkeley; University of California, San Francisco
- Occupations: Blogger, food writer, and cookbook author
- Spouse: Henry Fong
- Writing career
- Years active: 2010–present
- Website: nomnompaleo.com

Michelle Tam (born September 20, 1974) is an American blogger, food writer, and bestselling cookbook author known for recipes and food writing focused on the Paleolithic diet and lifestyle.

== Nom Nom Paleo ==
Wanting to see her adopted diet and lifestyle reflected online, Tam launched her food blog, Nom Nom Paleo, in October 2010. Noted for its humor, high-quality recipes, and distinctive photography, Tam's website has earned multiple awards, including Saveur Magazine’s Best Food Blog Award (Special Diets). By the fall of 2014, Nom Nom Paleo was receiving 110,000 page views per day (3.3 million page views per month), with The New York Times calling Tam "something of a Martha Stewart of Paleo."

Tam's first cookbook, Nom Nom Paleo: Food for Humans, became a New York Times bestseller, and was recognized as one of the Best of the Best Cookbooks of 2013, as well as one of the best cookbooks of 2014 by Serious Eats and America's Test Kitchen. Six months after the cookbook's release, Tam's publisher reported that it was in its seventh printing, with 150,000 copies in print. In March 2015, Tam's cookbook was nominated for a James Beard Foundation Award.

In 2014, Tam's Nom Nom Paleo cooking app for the iPhone and iPad earned a People's Voice Webby Award in the Lifestyle (Tablet & All Other Devices) category.

Tam's second cookbook, Ready or Not!, debuted in August 2017 on the New York Times bestseller list, and reached #1 on both the Wall Street Journal Bestsellers List and the Publishers Weekly Bestsellers List for Hardcover Nonfiction.

Best known for her focus on the Paleo lifestyle, Tam is also widely recognized as an "early adherent of sous vide cooking" and an "early convert" to Instant Pot pressure cooking. Tam has also garnered praise from noted culinary professionals like Michael Ruhlman and Christopher Kimball. Tam and her work have been featured across various media outlets, including CBS This Morning, Bon Appétit, Serious Eats, The Kitchn, Epicurious, Sunset Magazine, The New Yorker, and The Food Network. She maintains a partnership with Whole Foods Market, which has featured her recipes and product selections in store locations and online.

== Personal life ==
A native of the San Francisco Bay Area, Tam received a Bachelor of Science degree in Nutrition and Food Science from the University of California, Berkeley. After earning a Doctorate of Pharmacy from the University of California, San Francisco, she worked as a full-time night-shift hospital pharmacist. Tam is married to her co-author and collaborator, Henry Fong. Together with their two young sons, they divide their time between Palo Alto, California and Portland, Oregon.

== See also ==
- Melissa Hartwig
- Danielle Walker (writer)
