= Haile Debas =

Eritrean–American physician

Haile Tesfaye Debas
- Born: 1937 (age 88–89); Asmara
- Citizenship: Eritrea
- Education: University College of Addis Ababa McGill University University of British Columbia
- Occupation: academic administrator physician scientist
- Employer(s): University of California, San Francisco

Haile Tesfaye Debas (born 1937) is an Eritrean physician and academic administrator at the University of California, San Francisco (UCSF).

== Life ==
Haile T. Debas was born in Asmara in 1937. Following undergraduate training at the University College of Addis Ababa, he received his M.D. from McGill University in 1963 and completed his surgical training at the University of British Columbia. His postgraduate training included a year as a research fellow at the University of Glasgow/Western Infirmary in Scotland and two years at UCLA as a Medical Research Council Scholar in gastrointestinal physiology.

After a year in private practice in the Yukon Territories and British Columbia, he joined the surgery faculty of the University of British Columbia from 1970 to 1980 and then served on the faculty of UCLA (1980–1985) and the University of Washington (1985–1987). In 1987, Debas came to UCSF as chair of the Department of Surgery. Debas served as Dean of the UCSF School of Medicine from 1993–2003. In 1997, Haile T. Debas was appointed the seventh Chancellor of UCSF. Debas was the founding Executive Director of UCSF Global Health Sciences (GHS) since its establishment in 2003 until the appointment of Jaime Sepúlveda in 2011.

He is a fellow of the American Academy of Arts and Sciences and a member of the Institute of Medicine. He currently serves on the United Nations Commission on HIV/AIDS and Governance in Africa and on the Committee on Science, Engineering, and Public Policy of the National Academy of Sciences.
