= Joseph B. Martin =

Canadian neurologist

Joseph Boyd Martin (born October 20, 1938, in Bassano, Alberta) is a Canadian physician who is the Edward R. and Anne G. Lefler Professor Emeritus of Neurobiology at Harvard Medical School. Prior to that, he served as the Dean of Harvard Medical School from 1997 before stepping down on June 30, 2007.

== Career ==
Martin completed undergraduate studies and medical school at the University of Alberta, Edmonton, Alberta, Canada. He was the first in his extended family to further his education beyond high school. He also completed some undergraduate studies at Eastern Mennonite College, since renamed Eastern Mennonite University. Subsequent to his medical school graduation, he completed his residency in neurology at Case Western Reserve University and received his Ph.D. in anatomy from the University of Rochester.

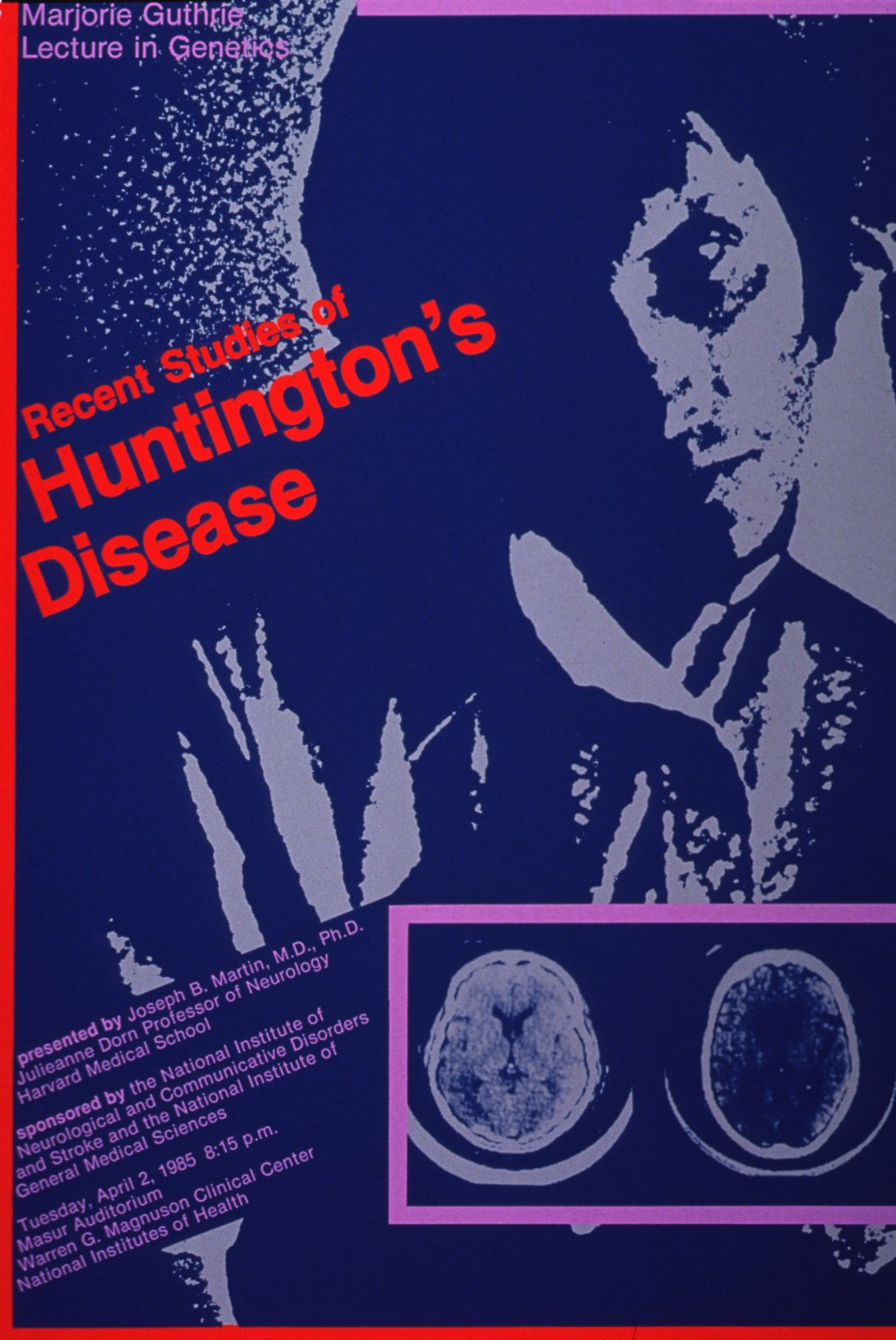
Martin delivers lecture on Huntington's Disease, 1985

Martin's first faculty position was at McGill University, Montreal, Quebec, Canada, where he rose to become Chair of the Department of Neurology and Neurosurgery at the young age of 38, only five years following completion of his Ph.D. He subsequently joined the faculty of Harvard Medical School, where he chaired the Department of Neurology at Massachusetts General Hospital, succeeding renowned neurologist Raymond Adams. During his tenure at MGH, he also served as interim director of the hospital, where his administrative and leadership qualities led him to become on the short list for a number of high-ranking jobs.

In this context, Martin became Dean of the School of Medicine at the University of California, San Francisco in 1989 and then became that institution's Chancellor. He spent a total of eight years there, during which he became less involved in benchtop science and clinical medicine, although both remained a passion. With respect to the former, Martin's lab at MGH, under the lead direction of James F. Gusella, was the first to identify a biomarker that soon thereafter led to location of the gene for Huntington's disease, a major breakthrough at the time and one of the first demonstrations of a true connectivity between genetics and disease. At UCSF he was instrumental in identifying new research space and building new research facilities despite limited available areas and significant neighborhood pushback, which Martin worked through with his characteristic ability to build consensus.

Following his time at UCSF, Martin returned to Harvard to become the 22nd Dean of that university's School of Medicine in 1997. As Dean, he was instrumental in funding and building a major new research building across the street from the quad and Boston Latin School. The building bears a conference center in his name. Beyond his various academic and financial achievements at Harvard, his tenure was notable for his advocacy of minorities and women and for his ability to ease through the contentious aftermath of the formation of disparate hospital systems affiliated with Harvard that had occurred prior to his arrival.

During his academic career he has been an editor of Harrison's Principles of Internal Medicine and has published over 325 articles. Additionally, he has served on the editorial boards of the New England Journal of Medicine, Annals of Neurology, and Science, leading journals for clinical medicine and therapeutics, neurology, and emerging science, respectively. He has also been elected a member of multiple medical and scientific societies including the Institute of Medicine of the National Academy of Sciences and is a past president of the American Neurological Association. He has also served on the Board of Directors of several companies, including Baxter International, from which he stepped down in Spring 2011.

In May 2015, Martin was honored by receiving an endowed chair at Harvard Medical School: the Martin Family Professorship in Basic Research. It was renamed the Joseph B Martin Professorship in Basic Research upon his retirement in June 2016. It is one of only 46 such endowed chairs in the quad research area at Harvard Medical School. Martin is also the recipient of eight honorary doctorate degrees.

On December 29, 2017, Martin was appointed an officer of the Order of Canada, for "his sustained and influential leadership in academic medicine, and for his contributions to building health research institutions in North America." In 2020, he was elected into the Canadian Medical Hall of Fame for “his ability to promote collaboration in building and expanding the institutional foundations of medical education and science in North America.”

== Personal life ==
Martin and his wife, Rachel (maiden name Wenger), are parents of four children and have ten grandchildren. His nephew, Jeff Shantz, was a National Hockey League player for the Chicago Blackhawks, Calgary Flames, and Colorado Avalanche.

Martin's memoir, entitled Alfalfa to Ivy, was released in August 2011. The book chronicles his rise from rural Western Canada and a one-room schoolhouse to worldwide esteem and leadership of some of the world's leading academic institutions, while also offering perspectives on current issues facing the academic and health care landscapes.

His second book, "Science, Religion and Society: A Medical Perspective", was published in July 2017. It consists of a series of lectures he has given on related topics since 1981, followed by a review of his perspectives on how these viewpoints align and at times conflict with the current medical landscape.
