= Beta-2 adrenergic antagonist =

A Beta-2 adrenergic antagonist (β_{2}-adrenoceptor antagonist) is an adrenergic antagonist which blocks the beta-2 adrenergic receptors of cells, with either high specificity (an antagonist which is selective for β_{2} adrenoceptors) like Butaxamine and ICI-118,551, or non-specifically (an antagonist for β_{2} and for β_{1} or β_{3} adrenoceptors) like the non-selective betablocker Propranolol.

== See also ==
- ICI-118,551
- Butaxamine
- Propranolol
- Betablocker
- Beta-2 adrenergic receptor
- Beta2-adrenergic agonist
