= Wendy Max =

Wendy B. Max
- Occupation: Professor of Health Economics emerita

Academic background
- Education: Ph.D. in Economics; B.A. in History and Economics

Wendy B. Max is professor of health economics emerita and a former director of the Institute for Health & Aging in the School of Nursing at the University of California, San Francisco. Her focus is on the cost of illness, in particular the cost of smoking-related illness. Max was an undergraduate at Stanford University. She went on to earn her Ph.D. in economics at the University of Colorado at Boulder.

== Notable publications include ==
- 2004 Froelicher ES, Sohn M, Max W, Bacchetti P. Women's initiative for nonsmoking VII: Evaluation of health service utilization and costs among women smokers with cardiovascular disease. Journal of Cardiopulmonary Rehabilitation 2004; 24: 218–228.
- 2004 Max W, Rice DP, Finkelstein E, Bardwell RA, Leadbetter MS. The economic toll of intimate partner violence against women in the United States, 1995. Violence and Victims 19(3): 259–72.
- 2004 Max W, Rice DP, Sung H-Y, Zhang X, Miller L. The economic burden of smoking in California. Tobacco Control 2004; 13: 264–67.
