= Fetendo =

- Other names: Fetal Endoscopic
- Specialty: Fetal and pediatric surgeon

Fetendo or Fetal Endoscopic surgery is a form of fetal intervention in the treatment of birth defects and other fetal problems. The procedure uses real-time video imagery from fetoscopy and ultrasonography to guide very small surgical instruments into the uterus in order to surgically help the fetus. The name Fetendo was adopted for the procedure because of how the video-based manipulation recalls a video game.

== Overview ==
Fetendo intervention is less invasive than open fetal surgery. It can be often be achieved with just a small guided wire sent through a needle-puncture of the skin (percutaneous), though in some cases it may require that a small opening be made in the mother's abdomen.

The fact that it is less invasive reduces the mother's postoperative recovery and lessens the troubles with preterm labor.

Fetendo has proven to be very useful for some, but not all, fetal conditions. Some examples include:

- Twin-twin transfusion syndrome - laser ablation of vessels
- Fetal bladder obstructions
- Aortic or pulmonary valvuloplasty - opening the aortic or pulmonary fetal heart valves to allow blood flow
- Atrial septostomy - opening the inter-atrial septum of the fetal heart to allow unrestricted blood flow between the atria
- Congenital diaphragmatic hernia - balloon tracheal occlusion

== See also ==
- Image-guided surgery
- Fetoscopy
