= Fabrizio Benedetti =

American biochemist

- Scientific career
- Fields: Neuroscience, Placebo studies.
- Workplaces: University of Turin Medical School

Fabrizio Benedetti is professor of physiology and neuroscience at the University of Turin Medical School in Turin, Italy and a researcher in the field of placebo studies. He is known for his research into the placebo and nocebo effects.

== Placebo and nocebo research ==
Benedetti began studying placebos in the 1990s while researching pain. His research has found that "the promise of treatment activates areas of the brain involved in weighing the significance of events and the seriousness of threats." Another of Benedetti's studies examined the effectiveness of placebos in the treatment of Parkinson's disease, and the effect of this treatment on neurons that control movement. He found that giving these patients a placebo led to a decrease in the rate at which these neurons fired of about 40%, and that this enabled the patients to move more easily. In 2007, Benedetti published a study in which he and his co-authors gave subjects morphine during a hand-squeezing exercise, and later replaced the morphine with a placebo without the subjects' knowledge. In this study, the subjects who received morphine and then a placebo endured significantly more pain than did patients in any of the control groups. In a 2011 paper, Benedetti and co-authors argued that there exist many different placebo effects, "with different mechanisms and in different diseases, systems, and therapeutic interventions."

He has also published research on the nocebo effect, in which adverse events are produced as a result of negative expectations. In some of these studies, he found that cholecystokinin is responsible for the transmission of pain by the nocebo effect. This research also found that drugs used to block this chemical, such as proglumide, can also stop nocebo pain. Another of Benedetti's studies found that when individuals were told about a possible link between high altitudes and headaches before going on a high-altitude hike in the Italian Alps, it led to an enhancement of the cyclooxygenase-prostaglandin pathway in those individuals, and that they developed significantly more headaches than the control group did.

=== Impact ===
Benedetti has been credited as being partly responsible for the increasing respectability of research into the placebo effect. A review of his book Placebo Effects: Understanding the mechanisms in health and disease in the New England Journal of Medicine stated that he runs "the foremost laboratory for the study of placebo effects in the world."

== Awards and honors ==
Benedetti is a member of the Academy of Europe and the European Dana Alliance for the Brain. Additionally, his book Placebo Effects: Understanding the mechanisms in health and disease won the British Medical Association's Highly Commended Book Award.

== Books ==
- Benedetti, Fabrizio (2009). Placebo effects : understanding the mechanisms in health and disease (1st ed.). Oxford: Oxford University Press. ISBN 978-0199559121. Later editions: 2014 (2nd), 2021 (3rd).
- Benedetti, F. (2011). The patient's brain : the neuroscience behind the doctor-patient relationship. Oxford: Oxford University Press. ISBN 9780199579518.
