= Sue Desmond-Hellmann =

American oncologist, academic, and nonprofit administrator (born 1958)

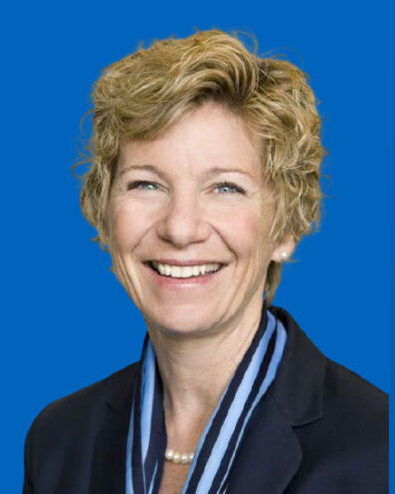
- Born: 1958 (age 67–68); Napa, California, U.S.
- Education: University of Nevada, Reno (BS, MD); University of California, Berkeley (MPH)

External audio
- “Pandemic Perspectives: Interview with Sue Desmond-Hellmann”, May 14, 2020, Science History Institute.

Sue Desmond-Hellmann (born 1958) is an American oncologist and biotechnology leader who was the chief executive officer of the Bill & Melinda Gates Foundation from 2014 to 2020. In March 2024, she was elected as a board member of OpenAI. She was previously Chancellor of the University of California, San Francisco (UCSF), the first woman to hold the position, and Arthur and Toni Rembe Rock Distinguished Professor, and before that president of product development at Genentech, where she played a role in the development of the first gene-targeted cancer drugs, Avastin and Herceptin.

== Early life and education ==
Born in Napa, California, Desmond-Hellmann grew up in Reno, Nevada, as one of seven children. Her father worked as a pharmacist and her mother was an English teacher. She graduated from Bishop Manogue High School in 1975. She earned a bachelor of science degree in pre-medicine and an M.D. from the University of Nevada, Reno and received her residency training at UCSF, where she was chief resident. She is board-certified in internal medicine and medical oncology, and also holds a master's degree in public health from the University of California, Berkeley School of Public Health.

== Career ==
=== Beginnings ===
Desmond-Hellmann was an associate adjunct professor of epidemiology and biostatistics At UCSF. She joined the UCSF medical faculty during the HIV/AIDS epidemic in San Francisco, and worked on Kaposi's sarcoma. Beginning in 1989 both she and her husband, an infectious disease doctor, spent two years as visiting faculty at the Uganda Cancer Institute, studying and treating patients with infectious diseases and Kaposi's sarcoma in a project funded by the Rockefeller Foundation. She then spent two years in private practice.

Returning to clinical research, Desmond-Hellmann became associate director of clinical cancer research at Bristol-Myers Squibb Pharmaceutical Research Institute. While there, she was the project team leader for Taxol.

In 1995, Desmond-Hellmann joined Genentech as a clinical scientist. She was named chief medical officer the following year, and in 1999 became executive vice president of development and product operations. From March 2004 to April 2009 she was president of product development, playing a role in the development of two of the first gene-targeted therapies for cancer, Avastin and Herceptin. She left after the company was acquired by Roche Pharmaceuticals. At that point her compensation was $8 million a year.

From 2005 to 2008, Desmond-Hellmann served a three-year term as a member of the American Association for Cancer Research board of directors, and from 2001 to 2009, she served on the executive committee of the board of directors of the Biotechnology Industry Organization. She also served a three-year term on the Economic Advisory Council of the Federal Reserve Bank of San Francisco beginning in January 2009. She was on the corporate board of Affymetrix from 2004 to 2009, and on the board of Procter & Gamble from 2012 to 2013.

=== Chancellor of UCSF, 2009–2013 ===
After being invited to apply, on August 3, 2009, Desmond-Hellmann became the ninth Chancellor of UCSF, and the first woman to hold the position. Desmond-Hellmann became the first Chancellor drawn from outside academia. Her starting salary was $450,000 a year.

In June 2010, one day after being questioned by The New York Times, Desmond-Hellmann sold her stock in the Altria Group, which owns Phillip Morris USA and other tobacco companies, and subsequently donated $134,000 to the tobacco control center at UCSF. She said that many of her holdings had been purchased on her behalf by her stockbroker and that she was too busy to oversee all her investments, although she had included the stock on her financial disclosure statement.

In January 2012, Desmond-Hellmann proposed changing the relationship between UCSF, a health sciences university, and the University of California. She proposed creating partnerships between UCSF and private pharmaceutical corporations and other sources of funding, in order to increase its revenues and resolve its projected financial instability.

Desmond-Hellmann served as UCSF Chancellor until March 2014, holding the Arthur and Toni Rembe Rock Distinguished Professorship during her tenure.

=== Precision medicine network ===
In 2011, Desmond-Hellmann co-chaired a National Academy of Sciences committee that recommended creating a Google Maps-like data network aimed at developing more diagnostics and treatments tailored to individual patients — a concept known as precision medicine. The so-called "knowledge network" would integrate the wealth of data emerging on the molecular basis of disease with information on environmental factors and patients' electronic medical records and would allow scientists to share emerging research findings faster, thereby accelerating the development of tailored treatments. It also would allow clinicians to make more informed decisions about treatments, reduce health care costs and ultimately improve care. The NAS report, titled "Toward Precision Medicine: Building a Knowledge Network for Biomedical Research and a New Taxonomy of Disease", was described by Keith Yamamoto, Vice Chancellor for Research at UCSF, as "the most important National Academy of Sciences Framework Analysis since that advisory body recommended that the United States go forward with the Human Genome Project".

=== CEO of Bill & Melinda Gates Foundation, 2014–2020 ===
On December 17, 2013, The Bill & Melinda Gates Foundation announced that it had selected Desmond-Hellmann as its next chief executive officer. She assumed her role on May 1, 2014, the first head of the foundation to be neither a former Microsoft executive nor a friend of the Gates', and the first physician.

In 2017, Desmond-Hellmann became a member of the Prix Galien USA Committee, succeeding Roy Vagelos as Chair of that Committee in 2018. She is also Chair of the Prix Galien International and Member of the Prix Galien Africa Committee.

In December 2019, Desmond-Hellmann announced plans to step down from her role as BMGF CEO "for health and family reasons". Mark Suzman will leave his role of BMGF president of Global Policy & Advocacy and chief strategy officer to become the new BMGF CEO on February 1, 2020.

=== Later career ===
In 2021, Desmond-Hellmann was appointed by President Joe Biden to the President’s Council of Advisors on Science and Technology (PCAST), co-chaired by Frances Arnold, Eric Lander and Maria Zuber. In March 2024, Desmond-Hellman was appointed to OpenAI's Board of Directors. In 2024 Desmond-Hellmann received the Clark Kerr Award for distinguished leadership in higher education from the UC Berkeley Academic Senate.

== Other activities ==
=== Corporate boards ===
- Facebook, Member of the Board of Directors (2013–2019)
- Pfizer, Member of the Board of Directors (since 2020)
- OpenAI, Member of the Board of Directors (since March 2024)

=== Non-profit organizations ===
- Global He@lth 2030 Innovation Task Force, Member of the Advisory Council (since 2015)
- California Academy of Sciences, Member of the Board of Trustees (since 2008)
- Howard Hughes Medical Institute, Member of the Board of Trustees (since 2012)

== Personal life ==
Desmond-Hellmann married Nicholas Hellmann in 1987.
