= Eric Coleman (doctor) =

American geriatrician and academic

- Born: California
- Citizenship: United States
- Education: University of California, San Francisco M.D. University of California, Berkeley M.P.H. University of California, Davis B.S.
- Awards: MacArthur Fellowship (2012)
- Scientific career
- Fields: Geriatrics, Medicine
- Workplaces: University of Colorado School of Medicine
- Website: https://www.caretransitions.org

Eric Coleman (born 1965) is an American geriatrician and academic. He was a professor at the University of Colorado School of Medicine. His research focuses on improving care transitions. Coleman was awarded a MacArthur Fellowship in 2012.
