= Marguerita Lightfoot =

American psychologist and academic

- Occupation: Professor of Medicine
- Awards: APA Award for Distinguished Early Career Contributions to Psychology in the Public Interest (2012)

Academic background
- Education: University of California, Los Angeles

Academic work
- Institutions: University of California, San Francisco

Marguerita Lightfoot is a counseling psychologist known for her research in the field of preventive medicine, especially in regard to HIV prevention and advocacy for homeless youth. She is professor of medicine at the University of California, San Francisco School of Medicine and the chief of the Division of Prevention Science. She serves on the National Academies of Sciences, Engineering, and Medicine Committee on Fostering Healthy Mental, Emotional, and Behavioral Development among Children and Youth.

== Biography ==
Lightfoot earner her doctorate in counseling psychology at the University of California, Los Angeles (UCLA). As a student, she received the Ann C. Rosenfield Distinguished Community Partnership Award in 2008. As a new scientist, Lightfoot was a member of the APA Leadership Institute for Women in Psychology.

At the UCSF School of Medicine, Lightfoot serves as the director of the Center for AIDS Prevention Studies and the UCSF Prevention Research Center. Her research on AIDS prevention has been funded through multiple grants from the National Institute of Mental Health. and the National Institute on Drug Abuse.

== Awards ==
Lightfoot received the American Psychological Association Award for Distinguished Early Career Contributions to Psychology in the Public Interest in 2012. Her award citation emphasized "her leadership, innovation, and commitment to applying psychological principles to develop behavioral health interventions for vulnerable populations, particularly homeless adolescents and racial/ethnic groups."

== Representative publications ==
- Lightfoot, M. (2012). HIV prevention for adolescents: Where do we go from here? American Psychologist, 67 (8), 661-671. https://doi.org/10.1037/a0029831
- Lightfoot, M., Comulada, W. S., & Stover, G. (2007). Computerized HIV preventive intervention for adolescents: Indications of efficacy. American Journal of Public Health, 97 (6), 1027-1030. https://doi.org/10.2105/AJPH.2005.072652
- Lightfoot, M., Rotheram-Borus, M. J., & Tevendale, H. (2007). An HIV-preventive intervention for youth living with HIV. Behavior Modification, 31 (3), 345–363. https://doi.org/10.1177/0145445506293787
- Lightfoot, M., Swendeman, D., Rotheram-Borus, M. J., Comulada, W. S., & Weiss, R. (2005). Risk behaviors of youth living with HIV: pre-and post-HAART. American Journal of Health Behavior, 29 (2), 162-172. https://doi.org/10.5993/AJHB.29.2.7
- Rotheram-Borus, M. J., Lightfoot, M., Moraes, A., Dopkins, S., & LaCour, J. (1998). Developmental, ethnic, and gender differences in ethnic identity among adolescents. Journal of Adolescent Research, 13 (4), 487–507.https://doi.org/10.1177/0743554898134006
