= ICI-118,551 =

Names
- IUPAC name 3-(isopropylamino)-1-[(7-methyl-4-indanyl)oxy]butan-2-ol

Identifiers
CAS Number	72795-26-7
3D model (JSmol)	Interactive image
ChEBI	CHEBI:91879
ChEMBL	ChEMBL513389
ChemSpider	3554
EC Number	998-334-3
MeSH	ICI+118551
PubChem CID	3682
UNII	46OL1UC10R
CompTox Dashboard (EPA)	DTXSID70874977
- InChI: InChI=1S/C17H27NO2/c1-11(2)18-13(4)16(19)10-20-17-9-8-12(3)14-6-5-7-15(14)17/h8-9,11,13,16,18-19H,5-7,10H2,1-4H3 Key: VFIDUCMKNJIJTO-UHFFFAOYSA-N
- SMILES: CC1=C2CCCC2=C(C=C1)OCC(C(C)NC(C)C)O

Properties
Chemical formula	C_{17}H_{27}NO_{2}
Molar mass	277.402 g/mol

Hazards
- GHS labelling
Pictograms	(GHS07: Exclamation mark)
Signal word	Warning
Hazard statements	H315, H319, H335
Precautionary statements	P261, P264, P264+P265, P271, P280, P302+P352, P304+P340, P305+P351+P338, P319, P321, P332+P317, P337+P317, P362+P364, P403+P233, P405, P501
- Except where otherwise noted, data are given for materials in their standard state (at 25 °C [77 °F], 100 kPa). verify (what is ?) Infobox references

ICI-118,551 is a selective β_{2} adrenergic receptor (adrenoreceptor) antagonist or beta blocker. ICI binds to the β_{2} subtype with at least 100 times greater affinity than β_{1} or β_{3}, the two other known subtypes of the beta adrenoceptor. The compound was developed by Imperial Chemical Industries, which was acquired by AkzoNobel in 2008.

ICI-118,551 has no known therapeutic use in humans although it has been used widely in research to understand the action of the β_{2} adrenergic receptor, as few other specific antagonists for this receptor are known. ICI-118,551 has been used in pre-clinical studies using murine models. When dissolved in saline, the compound crosses the blood–brain barrier. Common systemic doses used in rodent research are 0.5 or 1 mg/kg although efficacy has been demonstrated at doses as low as 0.0001 mg/kg (100 ng/kg) in rhesus monkeys. Doses up to 20 mg/kg have been used without toxicity. At room temperature in saline, the ICI 118,551 hydrochloride is soluble to at least 2.5 mg/mL.
