= Breast MRI =

Form of breast imaging

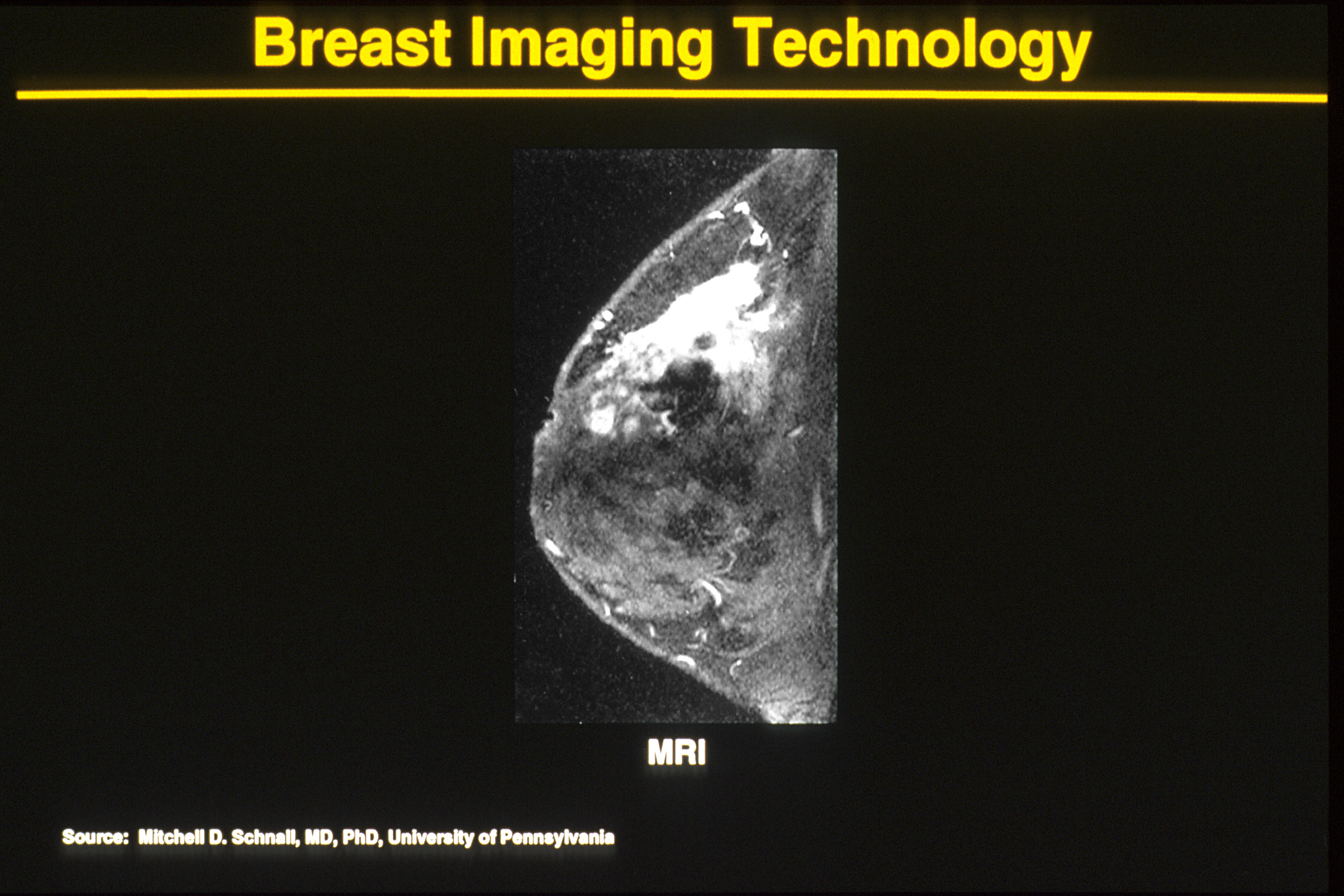
- Breast MRI demonstrating marked enhancement (bright area) which was confirmed to be cancer.
- ICD-10-PCS: BH3
- ICD-9-CM: 88.92, 88.97
- OPS-301 code: 3-827

One alternative to mammography, breast MRI or contrast-enhanced magnetic resonance imaging (MRI), has shown substantial progress in the detection of breast cancer.

== Uses ==
Some of the uses of MRI of the breasts are: screening for malignancy in women with greater than 20% lifetime risk of breast cancer (especially those with high risk genes such as BRCA1 and BRCA2), evaluate breast implants for rupture, screening the opposite side breast for malignancy in women with known one sided breast malignancy, extent of disease and the presence of multifocality and multicentricity in patients with invasive carcinoma and ductal carcinoma in situ (DCIS), and evaluate response to neoadjuvant chemotherapy.

MRI of the breasts has the highest sensitivity to detect breast cancer when compared with other imaging modalities such as breast ultrasound or mammography. In the screening for breast cancer for high-risk women, sensitivity of MRI ranges from 83 to 94% while specificity (the confidence that a lesion is cancerous and not a false positive) ranges from 75.2% to 100%.

== Nephrogenic systemic fibrosis ==
The systemic disease nephrogenic systemic fibrosis (NSF), caused by exposure to gadolinium in MRI contrast agents, resembles scleromyxedema and to some extent scleroderma. It may occur months after contrast has been injected. Patients with poorer kidney function are more at risk for NSF, with dialysis patients being more at risk than patients with chronic kidney disease. After several years of controversy during which up to 100 Danish patients have been gadolinium poisoned (and some died) after use of the contrast agent Omniscan, the Norwegian medical company Nycomed admitted that they were aware of some dangers of using gadolinium-based agents for their product. At present, NSF has been linked to the use of four gadolinium-containing MRI contrast agents.
