= Women in medical philanthropy in California =

There are women in medical philanthropy in California. California houses well-known medical research facilities, such as the University of California, San Francisco and the Stanford University School of Medicine, which require donors to support their research, and some of these donors are women. They include Lynne Benioff, Helen Diller, Hanna Gleiberman, Betty Irene Moore, and Dianne Taube.

== Lynne Benioff ==
Lynne Benioff’s medical philanthropy primarily focuses on children’s health in the San Francisco Bay Area. She aims to make healthcare more accessible to children.

=== Life and career ===
Lynne Benioff married Marc Benioff, the founder of Salesforce, in 2006. The San Francisco Bay Area resident gave birth at UCSF. She received her B.S. from the University of Washington. In 2014, Mayor Ed Lee named the philanthropist one of San Francisco's "Women of the Year." The following year, President Barack Obama appointed Benioff to the Presidio Trust board. After serving as board chair, she was reappointed as a board member in 2019. Benioff and her spouse purchased TIME in 2018 for $190 million and became co-owners of the company. She expressed her desire to take part in the promotion of health products and civil rights with the company. The George H.W. Bush Points of Light Award was presented to her in 2020. She participates on the board of directors of the UCSF Benioff Children’s Hospitals and the Benioff Ocean Initiative, among other organizations.

=== Philanthropy ===
In 2010, Benioff and her spouse's $100 million contribution to the UCSF Benioff Children’s Hospitals in San Francisco and Oakland was among the largest donations ever made to a public institution. The gift funded research for the development of children’s communication and prevention of premature births. $20 million was gifted to the University of Southern California in 2016 for the construction of its Institute for Transformative Medicine for cancer treatment and prevention research. The Benioffs partnered with the Gates Foundation to fund UCSF’s California Preterm Birth Initiative, which aims to reduce preterm birth and death among the children of women of color. The UCSF Benioff Center for Microbiome Medicine emerged in 2019 with a $25 million donation from the couple. The center partnered with the Stanford Microbiome Therapies Initiative, which received a $10 million gift from the couple to innovate microbiome medicine.

In 2023, The Chronicle of Philanthropy named Benioff and her husband among the top 15 most generous donors in the United States. That year, they donated $153.5 million, with the majority of those funds supporting UCSF. In 2024, the couple donated $150 million to improve specialized care for Hawaiian residents through a collaboration between Hawaiian hospitals and UCSF. The participating Hilo and Straub Medical Centers will be renamed after the Benioffs following their donation.

==== Non-medical philanthropy ====
In addition to medical philanthropy, Benioff also funds philanthropic acts regarding homelessness, education, and ocean preservation. She co-founded Star Community Home in 2011. The organization provides short-term housing for people who experience homelessness in San Francisco. In the same year, her spouse joined her in donating $1.8 million to provide temporary housing and rental subsidies for families. Benioff said her primary focus in San Francisco is supporting people who experience homelessness. The following year, the philanthropist and her spouse donated another $550,000 to continue supporting organizations that provided temporary housing and rental subsidies. In 2016, the couple founded the Benioff Ocean Science Laboratory at UC Santa Barbara with a $70 million grant aimed at improving ocean health. The Benioffs spread their philanthropy to Hawaii once again with a $5 million gift to support the Healthcare Education Loan Repayment Program.

== Helen Diller ==
Helen Diller was an American philanthropist best known for her work through her self-titled foundation, the Helen Diller Foundation.

=== Life and career ===
Diller was born Helen Samuels (on March 18, 1929) in San Francisco's UCSF Mount Zion Hospital. She was raised in the San Francisco Bay Area and attended UC Berkeley, where she met the co-founder of the Helen Diller foundation, Sanford Diller. They married in 1951. She was a mother of three and a grandmother of seven. Diller's Jewish upbringing inspired her philanthropic acts in medicine, Jewish education, and recreation. She won awards for her philanthropy such as the Visionary Leader Award from the Jewish Community Federation in San Francisco.

=== Philanthropy ===
Diller was the co-president of the Helen Diller Foundation alongside her husband. She is the namesake to various facilities, including educational, recreational, and medical facilities. Among the medical facilities, the 2009 UCSF Helen Diller Family Comprehensive Cancer Center research facility and the upcoming UCSF Helen Diller Medical Center at Parnassus Heights are named after her. She gifted $35 million to UCSF for the cancer research center. Her foundation continued donating to the school after her death, the total amount amassing to $1.15 billion.

== Hanna Gleiberman ==
Hanna Gleiberman is a philanthropist who majorly supports medical research in San Diego.

=== Life and career ===
Hanna Gleiberman is married to Mark Gleiberman, with whom she does most of her philanthropy. The former teacher is a trustee of La Jolla Playhouse, a theater at University of California, San Diego. Gleiberman was diagnosed with malignant tongue cancer in 2019 at UCSD Health. At the university, she endured a partial tongue and jaw reconstruction to remove the cancer.

=== Philanthropy ===
In 2021, the center where Gleiberman received her life-saving operation was renamed the Gleiberman Head and Neck Cancer Center following the couple’s $12 million gift. The gift increased pro bono care and research of head and neck cancer. In 2022, the couple gifted $20 million to UCSD to create the Hanna and Mark Gleiberman Center for Glaucoma Research following her spouse’s glaucoma diagnosis.

==== Non-medical philanthropy ====
Mr. and Mrs. Gleiberman donated $1 million to the UCSD Homelessness Hub to support research for policy work. The couple also hosted the Voices for Children charity event to raise money for San Diego’s children in the foster care system. Additionally, they donated $1 million for the construction of a playground for parents and children with disabilities that will fulfill sensory and cognitive needs.

== Betty Irene Moore ==
Betty Irene Moore was an American philanthropist primarily known for her philanthropic acts through the Gordon and Betty Moore Foundation.

=== Life and career ===
Moore was born Betty Irene Whitaker in 1928. She died at the age of 95 in 2023. She was married to the co-founder of their namesake foundation and the founder of Intel, Gordon Moore. She was a mother of two and a grandmother of four. In 1949, Moore graduated from San Jose State University with a journalism degree. Aside from her medical philanthropy, she volunteered at the Palo Alto Senior Day Care Center and served on the board of El Camino Hospital in Mountain View.

=== Philanthropy ===
The Moores' foundation, established in the year 2000, made the couple one of the most generous donors in California. In 2015, their $6.4 billion foundation was named one of the top 10 private philanthropies in the United States. Their donations primarily focus on medical innovation in the Bay Area and have also touched on sustainability issues, although the Moores requested the donations be limited to medical researchers that provide concrete results.

Betty Irene Moore is the namesake for many medical buildings, particularly in the northern UC medical group. The UCSF Betty Irene Moore Women's Hospital, the Betty Irene Moore School of Nursing at UC Davis, and the Stanford Health Betty Irene Moore Children's Heart Center are named after her for her financial contributions towards the construction and innovation of the facilities. Her $50 million contribution to the Stanford Children's Heart Center occurred as a result of her grandchild's successful heart surgery at the facility. Moore's gift was followed by the renaming of the heart center and the launch of an initiative to cure congenital heart disease.

== Dianne Taube ==
Dianne Taube is a philanthropist who primarily focuses on improving health care for youth.

=== Life and career ===
Taube was born in the San Francisco Bay Area and grew up in San Mateo County. The Jewish philanthropist of Hawaiian descent graduated from the University of Southern California School of Business. For the majority of her career, she worked in real estate, although she currently works at Panos Investments. Taube is the vice chairwoman of Taube Philanthropies, a philanthropy organization founded by her spouse, Tad Taube, whom she married in 1998. She is a trustee of the San Francisco Opera Association and a committee member of the Stanford Women's Cancer Center.

=== Philanthropy ===
In 2015, Taube was the chairwoman for Under One Umbrella, a yearly fundraiser for the Stanford Women’s Cancer Center.

In 2018, Dianne and Tad Taube created the Tad and Dianne Taube Youth Addiction Initiative at Stanford with a $9.5 million gift that increased accessibility to substance abuse treatment and its prevention. In the same year, the couple donated another $5 million to create the Taube Stanford Concussion Collaborative to prevent youth concussions. The couple made a $20 million donation to complete the construction of Stanford’s Lucile Packard Children’s Hospital and add 149 patient beds.

In 2019, the couple donated $5 million to El Camino Hospital in Mountain View to create the Tad and Dianne Taube Program for Adolescent Behavioral Health. Following the donation, the hospital renamed the new mental health facility after the couple. $6 million created the Taube Initiative at Stanford’s School of Medicine which focuses on innovating cancer cures for pediatric patients.

==== Non-medical philanthropy ====
Dianne and Tad Taube regularly donate to Northern California’s wildfire recovery. In 2023, they donated $1 million for Maui fire relief. To honor her hometown’s history, Taube and her spouse donated $8 million towards the construction of a San Mateo County History Museum. They also funded Jewish studies and sports facilities at Stanford.

== See also ==
- Edythe Broad – American art collector and philanthropist
- Priscilla Chan – American pediatrician and philanthropist (born 1985)
- Sue Gross – American billionaire philanthropist
