= Saint Mary's Hospital =

Saint Mary's Hospital may refer to:

== Canada ==
- St. Mary's General Hospital, Kitchener, Ontario
- St. Mary's Hospital (Montreal), Montreal, Quebec

== Ireland ==
- St. Mary's Hospital, Castlebar
- St. Mary's Hospital (Phoenix Park), Phoenix Park

== South Korea ==
- Seoul St. Mary's Hospital

== Uganda ==
- St. Mary's Hospital Lacor, Gulu

== United Kingdom ==
- St Mary's Hospital, Burghill, Herefordshire, England
- St Mary's Hospital, Isle of Wight, England
- St Mary's Hospital, Kettering, Northamptonshire, England
- St Mary's Hospital, London, England
- St Mary's Hospital, Luton, Bedfordshire, England
- Saint Mary's Hospital, Manchester, England
- St Mary's Hospital, Portsmouth, Hampshire, England

== United States ==
- St. Mary Medical Center (Langhorne), Langhorne, Pennsylvania
- St. Mary's Medical Center (Grand Junction, Colorado), Grand Junction, Colorado
- Saint Mary's Hospital (Waterbury), Waterbury, Connecticut
- St. Vincent Evansville, formerly St. Mary's Health, Evansville, Indiana
- St. Mary's Hospital (Leonardtown), Leonardtown, Maryland
- St. Mary Mercy Livonia, Livonia, Michigan
- Trinity Health Michigan, formerly Saint Mary's Health Care, of Grand Rapids, Michigan
- Saint Marys Hospital (Rochester), Rochester, Minnesota
- Hoboken University Medical Center, New Jersey, known as St. Mary Hospital from 1863 to 2007
- St. Mary's General Hospital (Passaic, New Jersey)
- St. Mary's Hospital, Galveston, Galveston, Texas (defunct)
- St. Mary's Hospital (Richmond), Richmond, Virginia
- St. Mary's Hospital Medical Center, Green Bay, Wisconsin
- SSM Health Saint Mary's Hospital – Madison, Wisconsin
- UCSF Health Stanyan Hospital, San Francisco, California, formerly St. Mary's Medical Center

== See also ==
- St Mary's Hospital Medical School, London
- St. Mary's Medical Center (disambiguation)
- St. Mary's Regional Medical Center (disambiguation)
- St. Mary Medical Center (disambiguation)
- Mount Saint Mary's Hospital, Lewiston, New York
- Mount St. Mary's Hospital, Niagara Falls, New York
- MyMichigan Medical Center Saginaw, formerly Ascension St. Mary's Hospital, Michigan, US
