= UCSF Health Hyde Hospital =

Coordinates: 37.789229°N 122.416982°W

- CommonSpirit Health (2019–2023), Dignity Health (1993–2023), UCSF Health (2024–present)
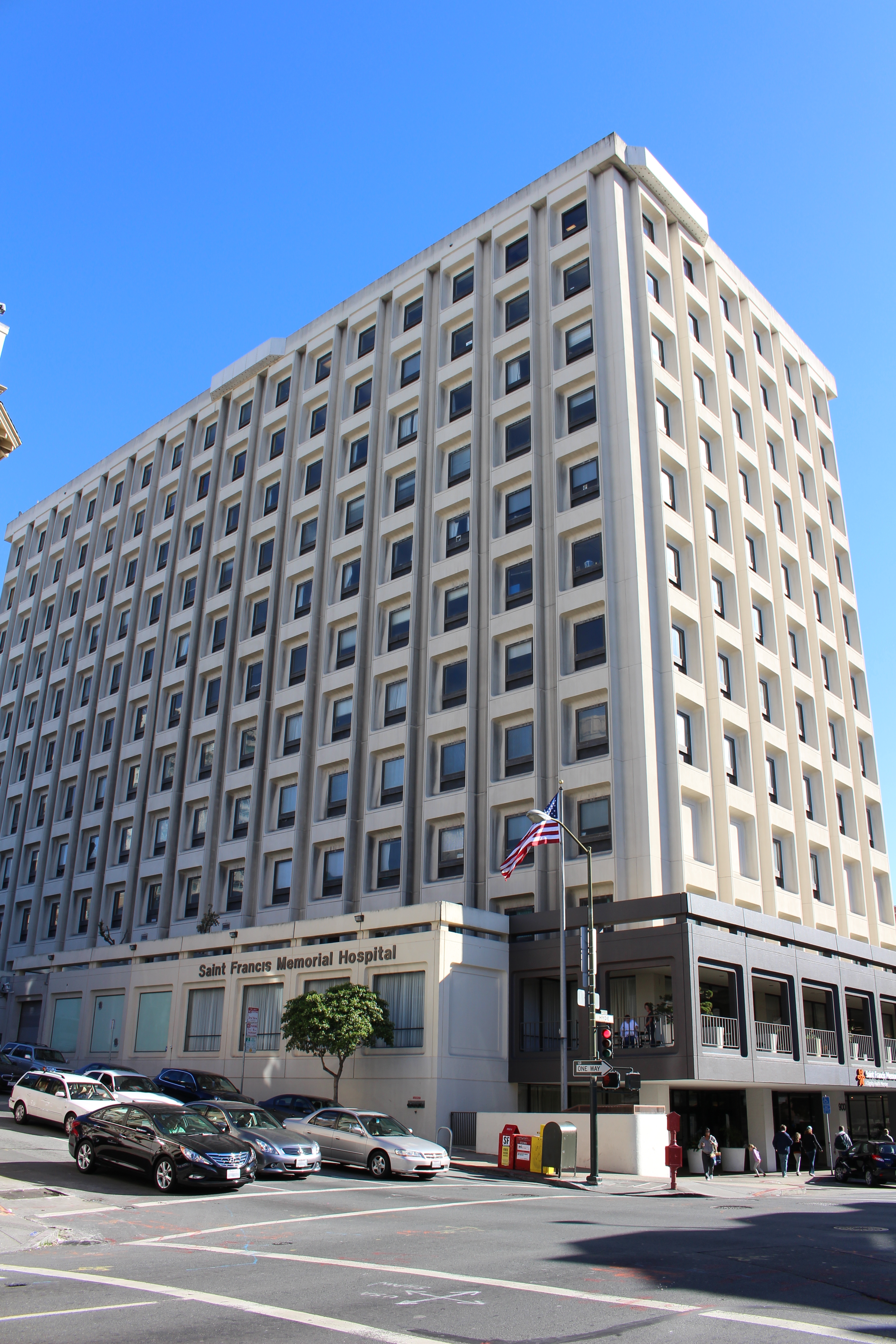
- Saint Francis Memorial Hospital in 2014

Geography
- Location: 900 Hyde Street, San Francisco, California, United States

Organization
- Care system: Private
- Type: Community
- Affiliated university: University of California, San Francisco

Services
- Emergency department: Basic Emergency Services
- Beds: 323

History
- Former name: Saint Francis Memorial Hospital
- Founded: 1905

Links
- Website: sfcommunityhospitals.ucsfhealth.org
- Lists: Hospitals in the United States

UCSF Health Hyde Hospital, formerly known as Saint Francis Memorial Hospital, is an accredited, not-for-profit community hospital that has been operating since the early twentieth century in San Francisco, California, United States. It is located at 900 Hyde Street, at the corner of Bush street, near the Tenderloin and Nob Hill neighborhoods.

Saint Francis Memorial was a member of Dignity Health starting in 1993, and later part of CommonSpirit Health in 2019. In July 2023, the University of California, San Francisco Medical Center (or UCSF Health) announced its intention to acquire both Saint Francis Memorial Hospital, and St. Mary's Medical Center from Dignity Health.

== History ==
Founded in 1905 in San Francisco by five physicians, they undertook to build "the most up-to-date modern hospital west of Chicago." It was not founded as a Catholic hospital, despite its name. The campus also contained a school for female students, the Saint Francis Memorial Hospital School of Nursing, which also founded in 1905. After the 1906 San Francisco earthquake and fire, the hospital campus burned down and it was moved to a temporary location at 2828 California Street by Dr. Redmond Payne and volunteers. In 1909, the hospital was moved to the former Morton Hospital campus (1904–1909), at 778 Cole Street, which only had some 30 beds.

In 1911, it opened a hospital campus its present address on 900 Hyde Street which offered 100 beds. In 1921, they expanded and added a 200-bed obstetrics wing. In 1938, it became the non-profit Saint Francis Hospital Association.

The Bothin Burn Center opened in 1967 as a 10-bed acute care ward, led by Dr. James Macho. In 1979, the Center for Sports Medicine opened, led by Dr. James Garrick; and was the first sports medicine program located in a hospital. In 1990, the Spine Center opened, under the leadership of Dr. Kenneth Light.

In 2001, the Total Joint Center opened, led by Dr. Thomas Sampson and Dominic Tse.

== See also ==
- List of hospitals in California
- Dignity Health
