= St. Mary's Medical Center =

St. Mary's Medical Center may refer to:

- St. Mary's Medical Center (West Palm Beach), West Palm Beach, Florida
- St. Mary's Medical Center (Blue Springs), Blue Springs, Missouri
- St. Mary's Medical Center (Knoxville), Knoxville, Tennessee
- St. Mary's Medical Center (Huntington), Huntington, West Virginia
- St. Mary's of Michigan Medical Center, Saginaw, Michigan
- St. Mary's Hospital Medical Center, Green Bay, Wisconsin
- St. Mary's Hospital and Medical Center, Evansville, Indiana
- St. Mary's Medical Center (Duluth), Duluth, Minnesota
- St. Mary's Medical Center (Clearwater, Florida), Clearwater, Florida
- St. Mary's Medical Center (Grand Junction, Colorado)
- UCSF Health Stanyan Hospital, San Francisco, California, formerly St. Mary's Medical Center

== See also ==
- St. Mary Medical Center (disambiguation)
- St. Mary's Hospital (disambiguation)
- St. Mary's Regional Medical Center (disambiguation)
