= UCSF School of Medicine =

Medical school of UC San Francisco

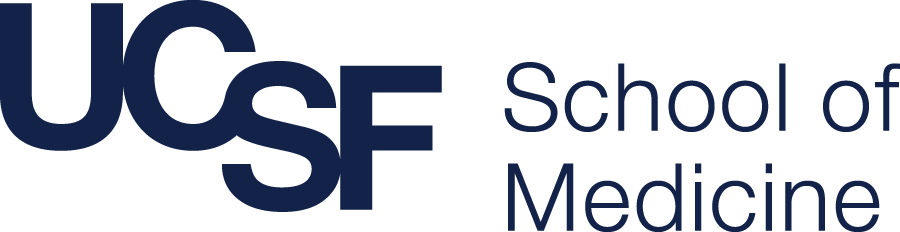
- Former name: Toland Medical College
- Motto: Fiat lux
- Motto in English: Let there be light
- Type: Medical school
- Established: 1864
- Parent institution: University of California, San Francisco
- Dean: Andy Josephson, MD
- Academic staff: 2,643
- Students: 1,428
- Doctoral students: 152
- Location: San Francisco, California; 37°45′46″N 122°27′29″W
- Website: medschool.ucsf.edu

The UCSF School of Medicine is a multisite medical school of the University of California, San Francisco, with a historical campus located at the base of Mount Sutro on the Parnassus Heights campus in San Francisco, California. Founded in 1864 by Hugh Toland, it is the oldest medical school in California and in the western United States.

For fiscal year 2022, UCSF was the second highest recipient of National Institutes of Health (NIH) research funding and awards amongst all U.S. organizations, with $823.7 million in funding across 1,510 awards. The school is affiliated with the UCSF Medical Center and the UCSF Helen Diller Family Comprehensive Cancer Center.

The UCSF School of Medicine has seven major sites throughout the San Francisco Bay Area and is composed of 28 academic departments, eight organized research units, and five interdisciplinary research centers. The main site is at the Parnassus Heights campus, which is home to the UCSF Medical Center and the Langley Porter Psychiatric Institute. The UCSF Medical Center at Mission Bay opened in 2015 and is home to the UCSF Benioff Children's Hospital, UCSF Betty Irene Moore Women's Hospital and the UCSF Bakar Cancer Hospital.

The school has a satellite campus, UCSF Fresno which provides doctors to Community Regional Medical Center in Fresno, California.

== History ==
The school was founded in 1864 as the Toland Medical College by Hugh H. Toland, a South Carolina surgeon who found great success and wealth after moving to San Francisco in 1852. A previous school, the Cooper Medical College of the University of Pacific (founded 1858), entered a period of uncertainty in 1862 when its founder, Elias Samuel Cooper, died. In 1864, Toland founded Toland Medical College and the faculty of Cooper Medical College chose to suspend operations and join the new school. In 1873 the college affiliated with the University of California. Together with the School of Dentistry, they became UCSF's first two “Affiliated Colleges” and were followed by the College of Dentistry in 1881 and the UC Training School for Nurses in 1907.

The University of California was founded in 1868, and by 1870 Toland Medical School began negotiating an affiliation with the new public university. Meanwhile, some faculty of Toland Medical College elected to reopen the Medical Department of the University of the Pacific, which would later become Stanford University School of Medicine. Negotiations between Toland and UC were complicated by Toland's demand that the medical school continue to bear his name, an issue on which he finally conceded. In March 1873, the trustees of Toland Medical College transferred it to the Regents of the University of California, and the school became "The Medical Department of the University of California."

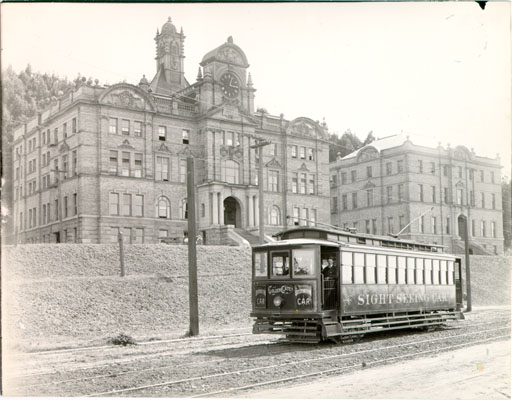
The Affiliated Colleges buildings. The Medical Department was housed in the building on the left.

Initially, the three Affiliated Colleges were located at different sites around San Francisco, but near the end of the 19th century, interest in bringing them together grew. To make this possible, San Francisco Mayor Adolph Sutro donated 13 acres in Parnassus Heights at the base of Mount Parnassus (now known as Mount Sutro). The new site, overlooking Golden Gate Park, opened in the fall of 1898, with the construction of the new Affiliated Colleges buildings. The school's first female student, Lucy Wanzer, graduated in 1876, after having to appeal to the UC Board of Regents to gain admission in 1873. In 1915, the Hahnemann Medical College of the Pacific became a part of the UC medical department.

The University gained more independence in the 1960s when it started to be seen as a campus in its own right instead of as the medical center of the UC system. The four departments were renamed as "School of ..." and the UCSF Graduate Division was founded in 1961. In 1964 the institution obtained full administrative independence under the name University of California, San Francisco Medical Center, becoming the ninth campus in the University of California system and the only one devoted exclusively to the health sciences.

A pivotal moment in UCSF history was the deal between Vice-Chancellor Bruce Spaulding and San Francisco Mayor Willie Brown for the development of the Mission Bay campus in 1999. Renowned scientist J. Michael Bishop, recipient of both the Lasker Award and Nobel Prize in Medicine (together with UCSF professor Harold Varmus), became the eighth Chancellor in 1998. He oversaw one of UCSF's major transition and growth periods, including the expanding Mission Bay development and philanthropic support recruitment. During his tenure, he unveiled the first comprehensive, campus-wide, strategic plan to promote diversity and foster a supportive work environment. During this time, UCSF also adopted a new mission: advancing health worldwide™. The 2010s saw increased construction and expansion at Mission Bay, with the Smith Cardiovascular Research Building, the UCSF Medical Center at Mission Bay, and the Benioff Children's Hospital in 2010, the Sandler Neuroscience Center in 2012, and Mission Hall and the Baker Cancer Hospital in 2013. In 2012, the school opened the UCSF Anatomy learning center. The Children's Hospital was named after Mark Benioff, who donated $100 million toward the new facility. In 2015, the Mission Bay campus saw the grand opening of the new UCSF Medical Center at Mission Bay, a 289-bed integrated hospital complex dedicated to serving children, women and cancer patients. The school started the new Bridges curriculum in 2016 with the class of 2020.

== Faculty ==
USNWR graduate school rankings
Medicine: Primary Care	Tier 1
Medicine: Research	Tier 1

The School of Medicine has 2,498 full-time faculty. There have been six Nobel Prize winners over the past six decades, and among its 2018 faculty members are:

- 43 members of the National Academy of Sciences
- 84 members of the National Academy of Medicine
- 18 Howard Hughes Medical Institute investigators
- 32 NIH Innovator and Young Innovator Awards
- 64 members of the American Academy of Arts & Sciences

== List of deans ==
The following persons led the UCSF school of medicine as dean:

No.	Portrait	Dean	Term start	Term end	Refs.
Toland Medical School (1864–1873)
1		Hugh H. Toland (Note: Founder of the Toland Medical College which later was absorbed by the University of California)	1864	1870	
2		R. Beverly Cole	1870	1875	
University of California, Medical Department (1873-1881)
3		Alonzo A. O'Neill	1875	1878	
4		R. Beverly Cole	1878	1882	
University of California, College of Medicine (1881–1961)
5		Robert A. Maclean	1882	1899	
6		Arnold A. D'Ancona	1899	1913	
7		Hebert C. Moffitt	1913	1919	
8		Wallace I. Terry	1919	1920	
acting		David P. Barrows (Note: UC president Barrows concurrently served as acting dean.)	1921	1923	
acting		Lionel S. Schmitt	1923	1927	
9		R. Langly Porter	1927	1936	
10		W. McKim Marriott	1936	1936	
11		Chauncey D. Leake	1937	1939	
12		R. Langley Porter	1939	1940	
acting		Robert Gordon Sproul (Note: UC president Sproul concurrently served as acting dean.)	1940	1942	
13		Francis S. Smyth	1942	1954	
acting		John B. Lagen	1954	1956	
14		John B. De C. M. Saunders (Note: Saunders became provost in 1958, a position he held concurrently as dean of the Medical School. He later became the first UCSF chancellor in January 1964)	1956	1963	
University of California, School of Medicine (1961–present)
15		William O. Reinhardt	1963	1966	
16		Stuart C. Cullen	June 1966	June 30, 1970	
acting		Charles T. Carman	July 1, 1970	December 31, 1970	
17		Julius R. Krevans	January 1, 1971	June 30, 1982 (Note: Krevans left position to serve as UCSF chancellor.)	
acting		Robert H. Crede (Note: Crede was also serving as Associate Dean of Academic Affairs and as a Professor of Medicine.)	July 1, 1982	February 28, 1983	
18		Rudi Schmid	March 1, 1983	June 30, 1989	
19		Joseph B. Martin	July 1, 1989	May 30, 1993 (Note: Martin left position to serve as UCSF chancellor.)	
20		Haile Debas	1993	August 31, 2003	
21		David A. Kessler	September 1, 2003	December 13, 2007 (Note: Kessler was formally dismissed for exposing financial irregularities that occurred in the School of Medicine prior to his recruitment.)	
Interim		Samuel Hawgood	December 14, 2007	September 17, 2009	
22		Samuel Hawgood	September 17, 2009	July 17, 2014 (Note: After serving acting UCSF chancellor since April 1, 2014, Hawgood was appointed full chancellor on July 17, 2014)	
Interim		Bruce Wintroub	September 11, 2014	June 30, 2015	
23		Talmadge E. King, Jr.	July 1, 2015	June 30, 2026	
24		S. Andrew Josephson, MD	July 20, 2026		

Table notes:

== Bixby Center for Global Reproductive Health ==
The Bixby Center for Global Reproductive Health, founded in 1999, is a research center studying obstetrics, gynecology, and reproductive science at the University of California, San Francisco School of Medicine and the San Francisco General Hospital. Its focus includes research, clinical care, policy development, and training on issues affecting sexual health. This includes resources and advocacy to advance reproductive autonomy, including access to contraception and abortion services, and access to care during pregnancy and childbirth.

The Center's founding director was Claire Brindis; as of 2021 it is led by Jody Steinauer. It includes over 200 medical, research, and other staff across the university, and runs a series of residencies and clinical care programs.

The Bixby Center's programs include research programs, fellowships and residencies, and training and clinical centers.

Research programs include Advancing New Standards in Reproductive Health, studying how policies and public discussion shape people's sexual and reproductive lives; Beyond the Pill, studying and promoting access to contraceptive health care for women; and PRONTO International and the Safe Motherhood Program, developing care strategies and training to optimize care during childbirth.

Obstetrics and gynecology residencies include a two-year fellowship in Family Planning, and the Kenneth J. Ryan residency program in the United States and Canada. Training and clinical centers include the California Prevention Training Center for HIV/AIDS and STD care and prevention, the New Generation Health Center for youth in San Francisco. Bixby has also supported international clinics, including the Family AIDS Care & Education Services in Kisumu County, Kenya, in partnership with the Kenya Medical Research Institute, and the Clinical Trials Research Center at the University of Zimbabwe, both researching treatment and prevention of HIV-related illness and women’s health.

A sister center on Population and Reproductive Health, was set up at UCLA.
