= St. Mary Medical Center =

St. Mary Medical Center may refer to:

- St. Mary Medical Center (Long Beach), Long Beach, California
- St. Mary's Medical Center (San Francisco), San Francisco
- St. Mary Medical Center (Hobart), Hobart, Indiana
- St. Mary Medical Center (Langhorne), Langhorne, Pennsylvania
- Providence St. Mary Medical Center (Walla Walla), Walla Walla, Washington
- OSF St. Mary Medical Center, Galesburg, Illinois

== See also ==
- Saint Mary's Hospital (disambiguation)
- St. Mary's Medical Center (disambiguation) of multiple medical centers
- St. Mary's Regional Medical Center (disambiguation)
