= Claire Brindis =

American paediatrician

Claire D. Brindis
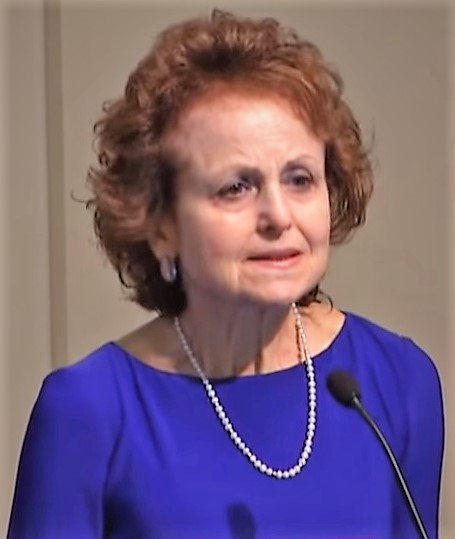
- Brindis presents at the Centers for Disease Control in 2018
- Education: University of California, Berkeley; University of California, Los Angeles
- Scientific career
- Fields: Public health Paediatrics
- Workplaces: UCSF School of Medicine
- Thesis: Adolescent development and its effects on sexual and contraceptive behavior : development and evaluation of a training design for health professionals (1982)

Claire Brindis is a Distinguished Emerita Professor of Pediatrics and Health Policy (on Recall), Department of Pediatrics and Department of Obstetrics, Gynecology and Reproductive Health Sciences and Emerita Director of the Philip R. Lee Institute for Health Policy Studies at the University of California, San Francisco (UCSF). Her research considers women's, adolescent and child health, as well as adolescent pregnancy prevention strategies. She was elected a member of the Institute of Medicine (now the National Academy of Medicine) in 2010.

== Early life and education ==
Brindis was a first generation immigrant to the United States. Her family are from Argentina, and her parents both worked as translators for the Los Angeles court system. She attended University of California, Los Angeles as an undergraduate, where she studied sociology and graduated cum laude. After earning her Bachelor's degree Brindis worked toward a Master of Public Health. She was a doctoral researcher at the University of California, Berkeley. During her doctorate, Brindis took part in a seminar on adolescent health. Her doctoral thesis considered how adolescent development impacted sexual and contraceptive behaviour.

== Research and career ==
Brindis started her career in the area of reproductive health and how disparities impact health outcomes. She joined the faculty at the University of California, San Francisco in 1983. Brindis was involved with the first evaluation of the 1115 Medicare waiver, which supported subsidised family planning in California. The success of the programme led Brindis to expand her programme. She has studied the impact of implementing the Affordable Care Act on young adults and the health of participants of the Deferred Action for Childhood Arrivals programme.

In February 2020 Brindis and her husband Ralph Brindis established the Institute for Medical Education Brindis Family Fund. They also established the Claire D. and Ralph G. Brindis Endowed Professorship in Health Policy Studies at the Philip R. Lee Institute for Health Policy Studies at UCSF.

== Awards and honours ==
- 1994 California Department of Health Services Beverlee A. Meyer Award for Excellence in Public Health
- 2000 US Department of Health and Human Services Integrity Award from the Office of the Inspector General
- 2005 Federal Maternal and Child Health Bureau Director’s Award: In Recognition of Contributions Made to the Health of Infants, Mothers, Children, Adolescents & Children with Special Needs
- 2009 UCSF Chancellor’s Award for the Advancement of Women
- 2011 National Academy of Medicine, elected member
- 2012 UCLA School of Public Health Alumni Hall of Fame
- 2014 American Public Health Association Carl Schultz Lifetime Achievement Award
- 2016 UCSF Lifetime Achievement in Mentoring Award
- 2018 UC Berkeley School of Public Health 75 Most Influential Public Health Alumni
- 2020 American Public Health Association Martha May Eliot Award Winners
- 2020 School-Based Health Alliance Pioneer Award
- 2021 Maternal and Child Health Bureau Title V Lifetime Achievement Award

== Select publications ==
- Tina Paul Mulye; M Jane Park; Chelsea D Nelson; Sally H Adams; Charles E Irwin; Claire D Brindis (1 July 2009). "Trends in adolescent and young adult health in the United States". Journal of Adolescent Health. 45 (1): 8–24. doi:10.1016/j.jadohealth.2009.03.013. ISSN 1054-139X. PMID 19541245. Wikidata Q37525484.
- M Jane Park; Tina Paul Mulye; Sally H Adams; Claire D Brindis; Charles E Irwin (10 July 2006). "The health status of young adults in the United States". Journal of Adolescent Health. 39 (3): 305–317. doi:10.1016/j.jadohealth.2006.04.017. ISSN 1054-139X. PMID 16919791. Wikidata Q36571320.
- Robert H Lustig; Laura A Schmidt; Claire D Brindis (1 February 2012). "Public health: The toxic truth about sugar". Nature. 482 (7383): 27–29. doi:10.1038/482027a. ISSN 1476-4687. PMID 22297952. Wikidata Q34251235.
