= University of California Health =

University of California Health is the academic healthcare system of the University of California, consisting of six medical centers:

- UC Davis Health
- UC Irvine Health
- UCLA Health
- UC Riverside Health
- UC San Diego Health
- UCSF Health
