= UCSF Helen Diller Family Comprehensive Cancer Center =

US cancer research center

Coordinates: 37.766436°N 122.390389°W

UCSF Helen Diller Family Comprehensive Cancer Center is an NCI-designated Cancer Center, affiliated with the UCSF School of Medicine and the UCSF Medical Center. It is one of 57 cancer research institutions in the United States supported by the National Cancer Institute as a Comprehensive Cancer Center, and one of three in Northern California. The HDFCCC integrates basic and clinical science, patient care, and population science to address prevention and early detection of cancer as well as the quality of life following diagnosis and treatment.

HDFCCC is a member of the University of California Cancer Consortium, the National Comprehensive Cancer Network (NCCN) and Association of American Cancer Institutes. Cancer programs at UCSF have been continuously accredited since 1933 by the Commission on Cancer of the American College of Surgeons.

== History ==
In 1948, the University of California at San Francisco (UCSF) established the Cancer Research Institute. In 1992, UCSF received an NCI planning grant to develop a cancer center. The center received its NCI "Comprehensive" designation in 1999 and was renamed the UCSF Helen Diller Family Comprehensive Cancer Center in 2007 in honor of philanthropist Helen Diller.

== Locations ==
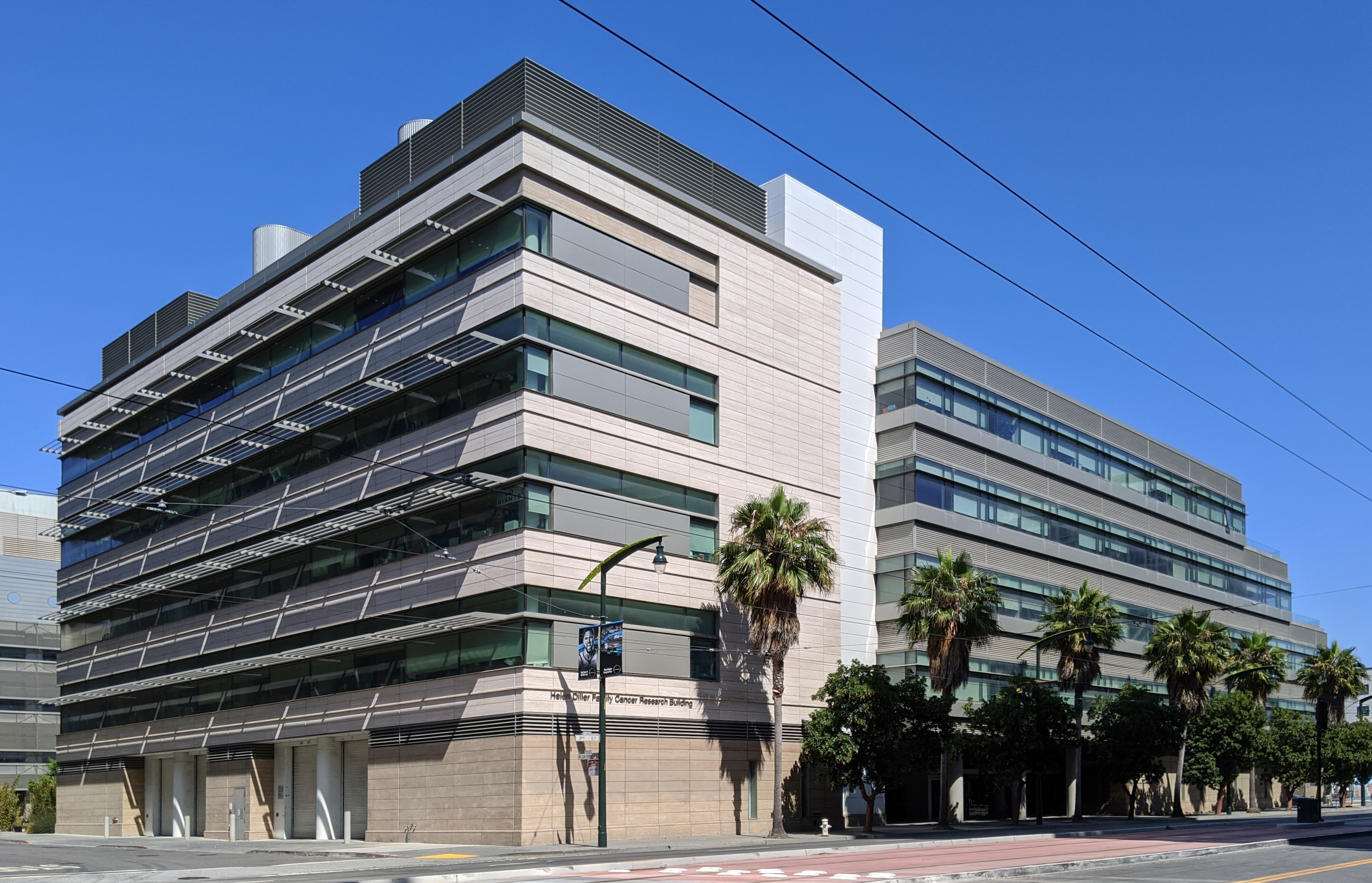
The Helen Diller Family Cancer Research Building in 2020

Cancer care, research, and training programs are carried out across San Francisco at UCSF locations at Mission Bay in Potrero, Mount Zion in the Western Addition neighborhood, Parnassus near Golden Gate Park, Zuckerberg San Francisco General Hospital in the Mission neighborhood, and San Francisco Veterans Affairs Medical Center in the Richmond district.

In addition to individual lab space across UCSF campuses, there are cancer research facilities at Mount Zion and Mission Bay. The Helen Diller Family Cancer Research Building at Mission Bay was designed by Rafael Viñoly and opened in June 2009.

UCSF at Parnassus Heights is the center for patient care in neurologic oncology; leukemia, lymphoma, myeloma, and other hematopoietic malignancies; and bone marrow transplant and cellular therapy. UCSF at Mount Zion offers outpatient facilities for radiation oncology, specialized services for endocrine and high-risk skin cancers, as well as support services. UCSF at Mission Bay serves patients with orthopedic, gynecologic, breast, lung, melanoma, head and neck, gastrointestinal, and genitourinary cancers. The Bakar Cancer Hospital opened on the Mission Bay campus in 2015 with 70 adult beds, and groundbreaking for a new Precision Cancer Medicine Building at the Mission Bay campus began in 2017, with the facility open to patients in 2019. The UCSF Benioff Children's Hospital is also at Mission Bay and accommodates the center's Pediatric Oncology Program.

== Ranking ==
UCSF is consistently top three for National Institutes of Health (NIH) funded research and the top public institution for 18 years in a row. In 2024, the center ranked first in California and fifth nationwide in National Cancer Institute (NCI) research grants. In 2024-2025 U.S. News & World Report "America’s Best Hospitals" survey ranked UCSF 7th for cancer care.
