= MyMichigan Health =

American health system

- Company type: Not-for-profit
- Industry: Healthcare
- Founded: 1984
- Headquarters: Midland, Michigan, United States
- Area served: Central and northern Michigan
- Key people: Lydia A. Watson, president/CEO; Don Sheets, chairman board of directors (2019)
- Revenue: US$959 million (2019)
- Net income: $28 million (2019)
- Number of employees: 8,800 (2020)
- Website: www.mymichigan.org

MyMichigan Health is an American non-profit health system, headquartered in Midland, Michigan, affiliated with Michigan Medicine, the health care division of the University of Michigan. MyMichigan Health covers a 26-county region with medical centers in Alma, Alpena, Clare, Gladwin, Midland, Mt. Pleasant, Saginaw, Sault Ste. Marie, Standish, Tawas City, and West Branch.

In addition to its medical centers, MyMichigan Health also offers both home health care and physician services, and has a strong commitment to medical education. MyMichigan Physicians Group provides urgent care and medical offices in more than 85 specialties and subspecialties. The MyMichigan Health Foundation supports patients and families served by MyMichigan Health by raising funds for equipment, services and programs. As of August, 2023 MyMichigan Health has more than 13,200 employees, volunteers and physicians.

== Community benefit ==
During the fiscal year 2025, MyMichigan Health contributed $243 million towards community benefit initiatives across a 26-county region. The calculation of the contributions includes charity care for uninsured and the financially needy as well as unreimbursed costs for providing care for those insured through Medicare and Medicaid. Also included is support of medical education, medical research, health promotion efforts and community education.

== Leadership ==
- Lydia A. Watson has been serving as president and CEO since December 2022.
- Richard (Rick) Reynolds assumed system leadership in 2008 and was instrumental in launching the open heart surgery program in Midland and the affiliation with Michigan Medicine.
- Terence (Terry) F. Moore was the health system executive from its founding in 1984 until his retirement in 2008. As of 2020, he continues to be active in area business development efforts and operates a local apple orchard. Moore is the author or co-author of ten books on hospital administration and leadership.

== History ==
MyMichigan Health was formed by the affiliation of hospitals in Midland and Clare in 1984. The hospital in Gladwin became an affiliate the following year. The hospital in Alma became a wholly owned subsidiary in 2004. The system's early history is documented in the book A Journey of Caring by Dorthy Langdon Yates.

In August 2012, MyMichigan Health announced it was in negotiations to affiliate with the University of Michigan Health System. The partnership was finalized in June, 2013. The University of Michigan Health System acquired a minority ownership stake in MyMichigan Health and two seats on the 17-member board of directors. The affiliation better positioned both organizations for anticipated health care reform.

MyMichigan Health provides consulting services to Mackinac Straits Health System although plans for acquisition of the critical access hospital in St. Ignace fell through in mid-2014. In early 2015, the system announced that it was divesting itself of its two nursing homes, MidMichigan Stratford Village and MidMichigan Gladwin Pines, a transaction that was completed the following year. During the same timeframe MidMichigan acquired Alpena Regional Medical Center and changed its name to MyMichigan Medical Center Alpena. West Branch Regional Medical Center (formerly Tolfree Memorial Hospital) joined MyMichigan Health as its sixth acute care hospital in 2018. It was renamed MyMichigan Medical Center West Branch.

On December 1, 2021, MidMichigan Health became MyMichigan Health as part of a system-wide brand transformation updating the health system and facility names, and logo.

As of August 1, 2024, the hospital and affiliated sites formerly known as Ascension St. Mary's in Saginaw was renamed MyMichigan Medical Center Saginaw, having been previously acquired by MyMichigan Health group from Ascension Health.

== Medical centers ==
Hospital	Location	Bed count	Emergency Department	Founded	Notes	Website
MyMichigan Medical Center Alma	Alma, Michigan	96	Yes	1955		
MyMichigan Medical Center Alpena	Alpena, Michigan	139	Yes	1940		
MyMichigan Medical Center Clare	Clare, Michigan	49	Yes	1936		
MyMichigan Medical Center Gladwin	Gladwin, Michigan	25	Yes	1953	Critical access hospital	
MyMichigan Medical Center Midland	Midland, Michigan	324	Yes	1944	Flagship hospital	
MyMichigan Medical Center Mt. Pleasant	Mt. Pleasant, Michigan	0	Yes	2017	Free-standing emergency department, outpatient surgery center, outpatient services with no inpatient beds	
MyMichigan Medical Center Saginaw	Saginaw, Michigan	268	Yes	1874	Formally St. Mary's Hospital	
MyMichigan Medical Center Sault	Sault Ste. Marie, Michigan	49	Yes	1822		
MyMichigan Medical Center West Branch	West Branch, Michigan	88	Yes	1929		
