= Benioff Homelessness and Housing Initiative =

The Benioff Homelessness and Housing Initiative is a research project at the University of California, San Francisco, funded by Salesforce founder and co-CEO Marc Benioff and his wife Lynne Benioff. It was established with a $30-million donation from Benioff on May 1, 2019. Its director is Margot Kushel, MD.
