= Sanford Diller =

American businessman and philanthropist

- Born: 4 June 1928; San Francisco, California, U.S.
- Died: 2 February 2018 (aged 89); Woodside, California, U.S.
- Education: University of California, Berkeley; Hastings College of the Law
- Occupation: Real estate developer
- Known for: Founder of Prometheus Real Estate Group
- Spouse: Helen Samuels
- Children: 3

Sanford Ned Diller (June 4, 1928 – February 2, 2018) was an American billionaire and the founder of Prometheus Real Estate Group.

== Biography ==
The only son of Claire (née Diller) and Jack Diller, Jewish immigrants from Vienna (originally from Eastern Galicia) who had settled in San Francisco, California. His parents owned a kosher style restaurant named "Diller's" in the Fillmore District in San Francisco during the Great Depression.

Diller graduated from the University of California, Berkeley and then graduated with a J.D. from the Hastings College of the Law.

After law school, Diller began acquiring and developing real estate in the mid-1960s. In 1965, he founded the Prometheus Real Estate Group. Prometheus grew to become the San Francisco Bay Area's largest private real-estate holding company of apartments with over 11,000 owned units and is valued at $2.3 billion. Prometheus was owned by Diller and his wife through a revocable trust.

Sanford died from natural causes on February 2, 2018, in his house in Woodside, California. He is buried in Mount of Olives, East Jerusalem.

== Philanthropy ==
The Helen Diller Family Foundation is the largest contributor to the University of California, including major gifts to Berkeley and UCSF. Since 2003, the foundation has donated $1.5 billion to the 10-campus university system.

In 2024, Berkeley unveiled the Helen Diller Anchor House, a 772-bed, residential building for Berkeley transfer students, that was designed, built and funded by the Helen Diller Family Foundation.

In 2017, the foundation donated $500 million to UCSF, the largest single donation in UCSF's history. In 2018, the foundation announced an additional $500 million commitment to begin planning a new UCSF hospital, the UCSF Helen Diller Family Comprehensive Cancer Center.

In 2002, the Helen Diller Family Foundation donated $5 million to establish an endowment for a visiting Israeli scholar at Berkeley's Center for Middle Eastern Studies. Following two additional donations, one in 2019 and another in 2021, Berkeley honored Helen Diller by naming its Institute for Jewish Law and Israel Studies after her. In 2003, the Dillers donated $35 million to fund The Helen Diller Family Comprehensive Care Center at the UCSF complex on the biomedical campus of Mission Bay.

Since 1999, the Dillers have donated over $1 billion via their family foundation named after his wife Helen. Other major gifts have funded the renovation of the Julius Kahn playground at the Presidio; Mission Dolores Park Playground, now named Helen Diller Playground; and the preschool in the San Francisco Jewish Community Center, named Helen Diller Preschool. They also have supported San Francisco's de Young Museum, Museum of Modern Art and Legion of Honor Museum.

The Foundation operates two Jewish teen programs: an international Jewish teen leadership program, the Diller Teen Fellows and the Diller Teen Tikkun Olam Awards. Since 2007, the Diller Teen Tikkun Olam Awards have recognized Californian Jewish teens who are outstanding role models in their communities.

The Helen Diller Institute at the Contemporary Jewish Museum in San Francisco is a collaborative work space where distinguished visiting scholars and project teams of CJM staff work together to create dynamic Jewish content and programs for the museum's diverse audiences. Its centerpiece is a Beit Midrash ("study hall" in Hebrew) for ongoing trainings that enhance exhibitions and programs in development.

== Political donations ==
Through the Diller Foundation donations have also been given to Pro-Israel organizations including the controversial doxing website Canary Mission and Regavim and far-right groups including Project Veritas and the David Horowitz Freedom Center. In 2023, The Nation reported that for tax break purposes the Diller Foundation sometimes channels donations through the Jewish Community Federation of San Francisco trust; in 2016 the Foundation donated $100,000 to an obscure Israeli nonprofit called Megamot Shalom, a front for Canary Mission.

== Personal life ==
In 1951, Diller married Helen Samuels (born 1928), the daughter of Jewish immigrants (however, her father, William, was born in Denver, Colorado and met Helen's mother, Dora Lipsky in Lodz, Poland) and a fellow Berkeley graduate whom he had met in college. Helen was born at Mount Zion Hospital (now part of UCSF) and lived on Pierce Street in San Francisco. Her father was a clothing salesman and shop owner.

The Dillers have three children: Brad Diller, Ron Diller, and Jackie Safier, president of Prometheus. Diller lived in Woodside, California.

Sanford Diller is also the second cousin of the well known media executive, Barry Diller.
