= MyMichigan Medical Center Midland =

Coordinates: 43.634146°N 84.256933°W

- MyMichigan Health

Geography
- Location: Midland, Michigan, United States

Organization
- Care system: Private
- Type: Community
- Affiliated university: Michigan State University College of Human Medicine, Central Michigan University College of Medicine

Services
- Emergency department: Level II trauma center
- Beds: 324

History
- Founded: 1944

Links
- Website: https://www.mymichigan.org/
- Lists: Hospitals in Michigan

MyMichigan Medical Center Midland is a 324-bed, non-profit hospital in Midland, Michigan. It is a member of MyMichigan Health, an integrated health delivery system affiliated with Michigan Medicine, the health care division of the University of Michigan. The medical center serves as a clinical site for medical students from Michigan State University - College of Human Medicine, Central Michigan University, and MidMichigan Community College nursing students. A family medicine residency program is affiliated with Michigan State University.

== History ==
MyMichigan Medical Center Midland was designed by architect Alden B. Dow and constructed amid wartime restrictions in 1943–44. The first fifty years of the hospital's history is chronicled in the book, A Journey of Caring, by Dorthoy Langdon Yates.

Over the years, MyMichigan Medical Center Midland became co-owned with other regional hospitals; as a result, the Medical Center in Midland became the flagship hospital of MyMichigan Health, which has been headquartered in Midland ever since.

== Specialties ==
MyMichigan Medical Center Midland is a secondary-level acute care hospital.

- The medical center was verified as a level II trauma center in 2014 by the American College of Surgeons.
- The medical center is the site of one of the three Gamma Knives in the state of Michigan.
- In August 2007, the medical center began performing open heart surgery.

== Leadership ==
Ada Mitchell, R.N. served as the initial superintendent when the hospital opened in 1944. Upon her resignation the following year, Bernard Lorimer became superintendent, a title later changed to president. He was succeeded by David A. Reece in 1977. Richard M. Reynolds served in the role beginning in 2004. In May 2008, Gregory H. Rogers was named the hospital's fourth president.

== Awards ==
- In 2007, the hospital was named a Thomson 100 Top Hospital.
