= Monica Langley =

American journalist and businesswoman

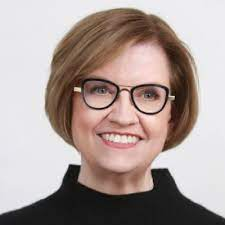
- Education: University of Tennessee; Georgetown University Law Center
- Occupation: Senior Executive at Salesforce
- Notable credit: Tearing Down the Walls: How Sandy Weill Fought His Way to the Top of the Financial World...and Then Nearly Lost it All
- Title: Executive Vice President, Global Strategic Affairs

Monica Langley is an Executive Vice President at Salesforce.

== Education ==
Langley graduated from the University of Tennessee with a B.S. degree, highest honors in journalism. She graduated cum laude from Georgetown University Law Center.

== Salesforce ==
Langley joined Salesforce in early 2017 as Executive Vice President, Global Strategic Affairs. Salesforce is the fastest-growing top-five enterprise software company and the #1 CRM provider globally. Langley works with Salesforce founder/CEO Marc Benioff and the executive team on global strategy, including strategic messaging, corporate positioning, external engagement and customer relations.

Langley is the bestselling co-author with CEO Benioff of “Trailblazer: The Power of Business as the Greatest Platform for Change,” published in 2019. Langley is the host of “The Inflection Point,” a digital series produced by Salesforce Studios, "where CEOs share how their personal backstories, professional influences and values inform their leadership".

== The Wall Street Journal ==
Prior to Salesforce, Langley spent 27 years at The Wall Street Journal. She has written many page-one profiles for the Journal, particularly of newsmakers such as CEOs, billionaires and presidential candidates. She has also broken news about high-profile companies including General Motors, Boeing, and JPMorgan Chase.

== Additional professional experience ==
Langley was an on-air commentator for CNN during the 2016 US presidential campaign.

External videos
- Booknotes interview with Langley on Tearing Down the Walls, April 2, 2003, C-SPAN

She wrote the 2003 bestselling book Tearing Down the Walls: How Sandy Weill Fought His Way to the Top of the Financial World...and Then Nearly Lost it All about Sandy Weill, the CEO of Citigroup. The book was published by Simon & Schuster.

Langley was an adjunct professor of journalism at Columbia University and of First Amendment law at Georgetown University Law Center. She was also a member of the bars of the U.S. Supreme Court, District of Columbia and Tennessee, and was a corporate lawyer for several years.

== Awards and honors ==
Langley won the 2009 Women in Communications Matrix Award.

== Personal life ==
Langley has one daughter, a medical student at the University of Southern California in Los Angeles, California, United States, North America.
