= St. Mary's Regional Medical Center =

St. Mary's Regional Medical Center may refer to:

== United States ==
- Saint Mary's Regional Medical Center (Arkansas), a hospital in Arkansas
- St. Mary's Regional Medical Center (Lewiston), Maine
- Saint Mary's Regional Medical Center (Reno, Nevada)
- St. Mary's Regional Medical Center (Enid), Enid, Oklahoma

== See also ==
- St. Mary's Medical Center (disambiguation)
- St. Mary's Hospital (disambiguation)
- St. Mary Medical Center (disambiguation)
