= UCSF Health =

Academic health system of the University of California, San Francisco

- Type: Academic health system
- Headquarters: San Francisco, California, U.S.
- President and CEO: Suresh Gunasekaran
- Parent organization: University of California, San Francisco
- Website: www.ucsfhealth.org

UCSF Health is the academic health system of the University of California, San Francisco (UCSF), providing adult and pediatric health care in San Francisco, Oakland, and elsewhere in the San Francisco Bay Area. Its principal components include UCSF Medical Center, UCSF Benioff Children's Hospitals, the UCSF faculty practice, Langley Porter Psychiatric Hospital, and community hospitals in San Francisco. UCSF Medical Center operates major clinical facilities at the Parnassus Heights, Mount Zion and Mission Bay campuses and functions as an academic medical center providing both community care and tertiary and quaternary referral services.

The health system developed from the University of California's teaching hospital at Parnassus Heights, which opened in 1907. Over the following century, UCSF expanded its clinical operations through the addition of Mount Zion Hospital, development of the Mission Bay medical center, affiliation with Children's Hospital Oakland, and acquisition of additional community hospitals in San Francisco.

== History ==
The origins of UCSF's clinical enterprise date to 1907, when the University of California opened a 75-bed teaching hospital at Parnassus Heights in space converted after the 1906 San Francisco earthquake. A purpose-built hospital opened in 1917, and in 1949 the University of California Hospital was renamed the University of California Medical Center. UCSF acquired Mount Zion Hospital in 1990. In 1997, UCSF Medical Center and Stanford Health Services combined their hospital operations as UCSF Stanford Health Care, a merger that was dissolved in 1999. UCSF affiliated with Children's Hospital Oakland in 2014, creating the two-campus UCSF Benioff Children's Hospitals system, and in 2015 opened a new hospital complex at Mission Bay for children's, women's and cancer care. The system expanded further in 2024 with the $100 million acquisition from Dignity Health of St. Mary's Medical Center and St. Francis Memorial Hospital in San Francisco. The hospitals were renamed UCSF Health Stanyan Hospital and UCSF Health Hyde Hospital, respectively, in 2025 as they were integrated into UCSF Health.

== Organization and facilities ==
UCSF Health's hospital operations include UCSF Medical Center facilities at Parnassus Heights, Mount Zion and Mission Bay; UCSF Benioff Children's Hospitals in San Francisco and Oakland; Langley Porter Psychiatric Hospital; and UCSF Health Hyde and Stanyan hospitals. The Mission Bay campus includes separate hospitals for children, women and cancer patients, while Parnassus Heights remains a principal site for adult inpatient and specialty care and Mount Zion includes inpatient, outpatient and specialty services. UCSF faculty also provide patient care and medical education at Zuckerberg San Francisco General Hospital and Trauma Center and the San Francisco Veterans Affairs Medical Center, institutions that are affiliated with UCSF but are not operated as UCSF Health hospitals.

== Clinical care and academic role ==
As UCSF's clinical enterprise, UCSF Health integrates patient care with the university's medical education and research programs. UCSF Medical Center serves as both a community hospital and a tertiary and quaternary referral center, including specialized programs for patients requiring complex care. Physicians in the UCSF Medical Group who practice at UCSF Medical Center and UCSF Benioff Children's Hospitals are full-time UCSF faculty, linking clinical practice with teaching, research and community service through the UCSF School of Medicine. The addition of Hyde and Stanyan hospitals broadened the system's community-based hospital capacity; UCSF described those hospitals as complementing its academic medical centers, which have a greater concentration of complex and specialized care.
