= Journal of Adolescent Health =

- Discipline: Adolescent medicine
- Language: English
- Edited by: Carol A. Ford, M.D.

Publication details
- Former name: Journal of Adolescent Health Care
- History: 1980–present
- Publisher: Elsevier on behalf of the Society for Adolescent Health and Medicine
- Frequency: Monthly
- Impact factor: 3.945 (2019)

Standard abbreviations
- ISO 4: J. Adolesc. Health

Indexing
- CODEN: JADHE5
- ISSN: 1054-139X
- LCCN: 91642057
- OCLC no.: 807447214

Links
- Journal homepage; ScienceDirect; Manuscript submission portal

The Journal of Adolescent Health is a peer-reviewed medical journal covering adolescent health and medicine, including biological, psychological, and social aspects. The journal publishes original research articles, review articles, letters to the editor, commentaries, and case reports. It is published by Elsevier on behalf of the Society for Adolescent Health and Medicine, and was established in 1980 as the Journal of Adolescent Health Care, switching to its current name in 1991. Carol A. Ford (Children's Hospital of Philadelphia) has been the editor-in-chief since 2019.

== Abstracting and indexing ==
The journal is abstracted and indexed by the Science Citation Index Expanded, Scopus, MEDLINE, EMBASE, and PsycINFO. According to the Journal Citation Reports, the journal has a 2019 impact factor of 3.9, ranking it 9th out of 128 journals in the category "Pediatrics", and 30th out of 193 journals in the category of "Public, Environmental and Occupational Health" (Sciences edition).
