= UCSF Health Stanyan Hospital =

Coordinates: 37°46′26″N 122°27′15″W

- UCSF Health (2024–present)
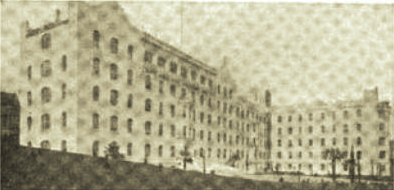
- (1925)

Geography
- Location: 450 Stanyan Street, San Francisco, California, United States

Organization
- Care system: Private
- Type: Community
- Affiliated university: University of California, San Francisco

Services
- Beds: 403

History
- Former names: St. Mary's Hospital, St. Mary's Medical Center
- Founded: 1857 (Sisters of Mercy)

Links
- Website: sfcommunityhospitals.ucsfhealth.org
- Lists: Hospitals in the United States

UCSF Health Stanyan Hospital, formerly known as St. Mary's Medical Center (SMMC), is a hospital in San Francisco, California, United States. It is operated by University of California, San Francisco.

In July 2023, the University of California, San Francisco Medical Center, announced its intention to acquire both St. Mary's Medical Center and Saint Francis Memorial Hospital from Dignity Health. It ceased being a Catholic hospital after the acquisition was completed in Spring 2024.

== History ==
UCSF Health Stanyan Hospital is the oldest continuously operating hospital in San Francisco. St. Mary's Hospital was opened on July 27, 1857, by the Sisters of Mercy. Prior to this, the sisters had operated the first County hospital in San Francisco, the Stockton Street Hospital. Only after the County refused to reimburse the sisters for their service were they forced to open SMMC.

St. Mary's sister hospital is Saint Francis Memorial Hospital, also in San Francisco, it is located between the Nob Hill and Tenderloin districts and is the only hospital in the downtown area.

In 1831, Irish heiress Catherine McAuley used her fortune to establish the Sisters of Mercy at the Convent of Mercy in Dublin, Ireland. A teaching-nursing-social services congregation that has become the second largest order of religious women in the world, the Sisters of Mercy sponsor and co-sponsor many organizations and ministries, including St. Mary's Medical Center and Dignity Health. Six Sisters from the order's Burlingame Region—which covers California, Phoenix, Arizona and Peru—continue to serve vital roles at St. Mary's today.

In 1854, Rev. Hugh Gallagher, at the request of San Francisco's first Archbishop Joseph Alemany, solicited the Sisters for service in San Francisco. Almost all of the 29 Sisters volunteered. Eight Sisters were chosen to make the journey, headed by 25-year-old Sister Mary Baptist Russell (née Katherine Russell), who had joined the order at the age of 19 and nursed victims through Ireland's horrible cholera epidemic of 1849—an experience that later would prove valuable in San Francisco.

The Sisters faced a harrowing, three-month journey. Mother Russell booked passage on the Arctic, scheduled to leave Dublin on September 13. In a twist of fate, the ship was overbooked, so the Sisters sailed from Liverpool on the Canada a few days later. The Arctic collided with another vessel in a dense fog, and everyone on board died. After crossing the Atlantic, the Sisters faced an exhausting crossing of the Isthmus of Nicaragua by river boat and mule train before boarding the Pacific steamer, Cortes, for the last leg of their journey, sharing the voyage with a motley crowd of gold prospectors. The valiant Irish nuns disembarked to a chilly gray dawn in San Francisco on Friday, December 8, 1854.

After a few weeks of sharing accommodations with the Sisters of Charity, the Sisters of Mercy rented a six-room cottage on Vallejo Street, across from the only hospital in the city of 35,000, the State Marine Hospital. Within months, the Sisters were called to aid a city in crisis when the S.S. Uncle Sam arrived September 5, 1855, carrying the deadly Asiatic cholera that ravaged the city for six weeks.

In the interval, the California Legislature had withdrawn its responsibility for the indigent sick, ruling that each county must care for its own. The San Francisco Board of Supervisors petitioned the Sisters to organize and operate the first County Hospital, using their own borrowed funds to purchase the old Stockton Street Hospital.

By 1857, it was evident the Board of Supervisors would not honor their obligations to reimburse the Sister for their expenses in caring for the indigent. The Sisters reluctantly had to terminate the Mercy management of the County Hospital. On July 19, the County patients were moved, and on July 27, the Sisters opened the Stockton Street building as St. Mary's Hospital, the first Catholic Hospital in San Francisco—beginning a new chapter in their ongoing story of providing health care and community services to the city of San Francisco.

In July 2023, the University of California, San Francisco (UCSF) health system announced its intention to acquire both St. Mary's Medical Center and Saint Francis Memorial Hospital from Dignity Health. Doctors at St. Mary's Medical Center launched a campaign to preserve its unique services once UCSF announced its intentions. This campaign "Save St. Mary's" was started by a committed group of St. Mary’s Medical Center doctors to ensure that the hospital and its award-winning medical services and programs remain part of the community for future generations. Among the services the physicians were especially concerned about were the Sister Mary Philippa Clinic, which provides care to the homeless and uninsured, and the St. Mary’s McAuley Institute, which provides acute inpatient psychiatric care for youth and young adults. This campaign was chaired by St. Mary's physicians Dr. Remo Morelli, Dr. Pamela Lewis, Dr. Kenneth Mills, Dr. Terrie Mendelson, Dr. Eugene Groeger, Dr. Diana Hilbert, Dr. Jennifer van Warmerdam, and Dr. Warren Chang. They were credited with ensuring services that St. Mary's has been offering from its inception continued through the transition to UCSF.
