= UCSF Betty Irene Moore Women's Hospital =

- UCSF
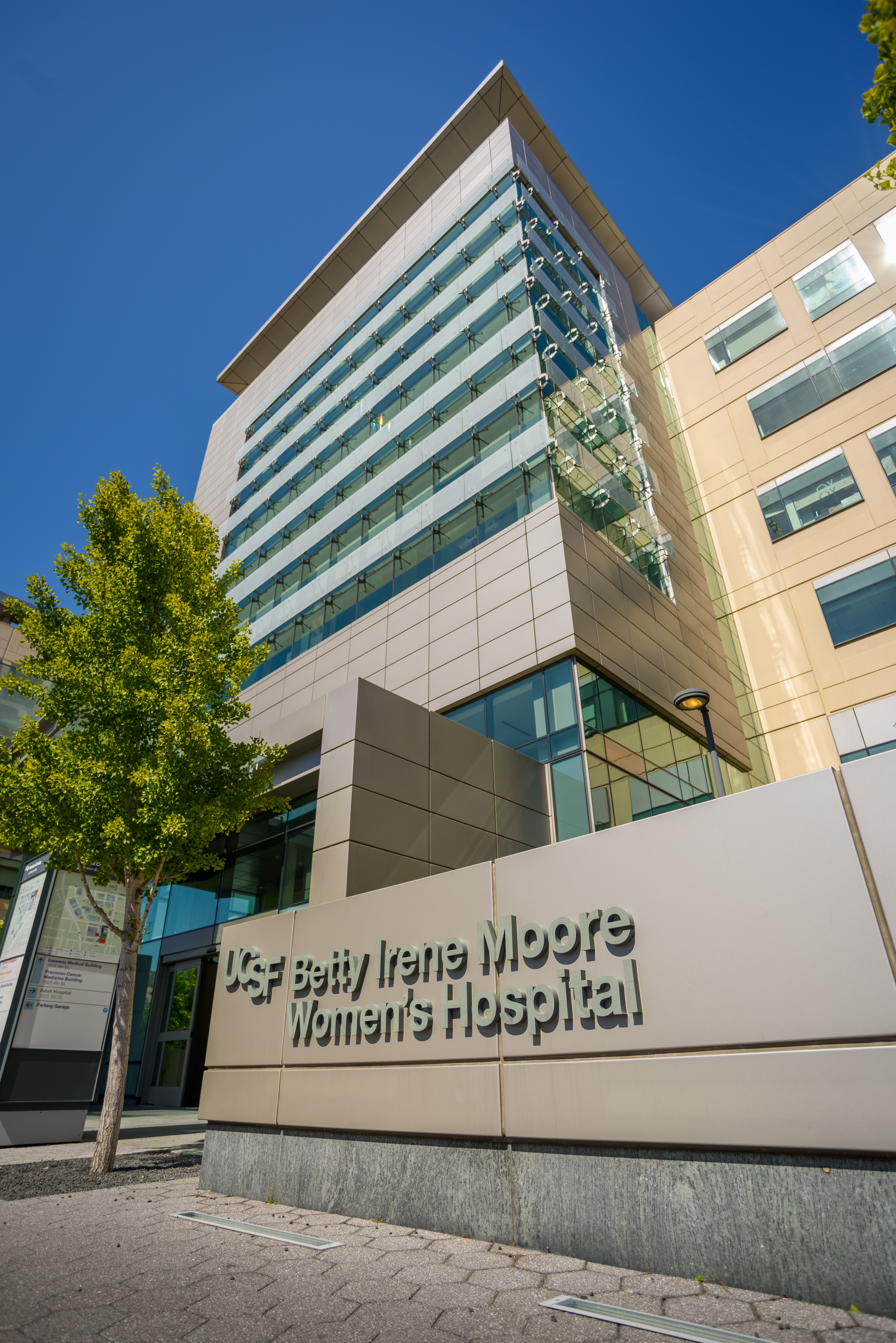

Geography
- Location: San Francisco, California
- Coordinates: 37.764804°N 122.389680°W

Organisation
- Care system: Private
- Type: Teaching
- Affiliated university: UCSF
- Patron: Betty Irene Moore

Services
- Beds: 36

Links
- Website: www.ucsfmissionbayhospitals.org/women/

UCSF Betty Irene Moore Women's Hospital is a women's hospital in San Francisco, California, part of the University of California, San Francisco health system. It is part of the UCSF Medical Center camps of Mission Bay. Opened on February 1, 2015, it was the first hospital dedicated to women in the San Francisco Bay Area.
