= Marc Benioff =

American businessman (born 1964)

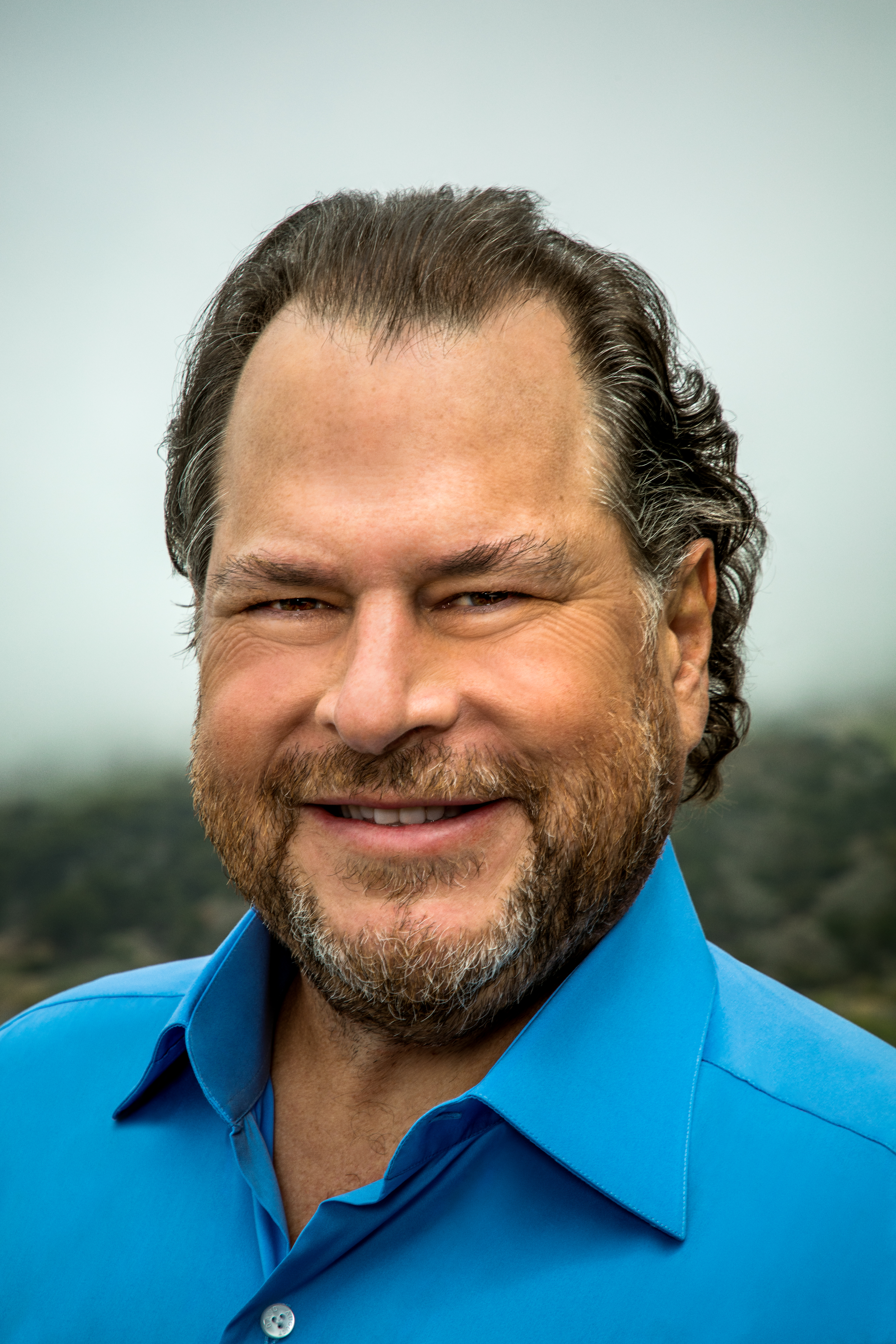
- Benioff in 2021
- Born: Marc Russell Benioff; September 25, 1964 (age 62); San Francisco, California, U.S.
- Education: University of Southern California (BS)
- Known for: Founder, chairman and CEO, Salesforce; Co-chair and owner, Time
- Children: 2

Marc Russell Benioff (born September 25, 1964) is an American internet entrepreneur and philanthropist. He is best known as the co-founder, chairman and CEO of the software company Salesforce, as well as being the owner of Time magazine since 2018.

== Early life ==
Marc Russell Benioff was born on September 25, 1964, in San Francisco, California. He is of Jewish heritage. He is the grandson of Marvin Lewis, a California trial attorney and member of the San Francisco Board of Supervisors who championed the creation of the Bay Area Rapid Transit (BART) system.

Benioff grew up in Hillsborough and graduated from Burlingame High School in 1982. Benioff received a Bachelor of Science in business administration from the University of Southern California, where he was a member of the Tau Kappa Epsilon fraternity, in 1986.

== Career ==
While in high school, Benioff sold his first application, How to Juggle, for $75. In 1979, when he was 15, Benioff founded Liberty Software, creating and selling games such as Flapper and King Arthur's Heir for the Atari 8-bit. Royalties from these games helped Benioff pay for college.

While at USC, Benioff had an internship as a programmer at Apple where he wrote assembly code for the Macintosh. He joined Oracle Corporation in a customer-service role after graduating. Benioff worked at Oracle for 13 years in a variety of sales, marketing, and product development roles. At 23, he was named Oracle's Rookie of the Year, and later became the youngest vice president in the company's history.

=== Salesforce ===
Benioff founded Salesforce in 1999, while working from a San Francisco apartment. He defined its mission in a marketing statement as "The End of Software." This was a slogan he frequently used to preach about software on the Web; it was used too as a guerilla marketing tactic against the dominant CD-ROM-based customer relationship management (CRM) software provider at the time, Siebel. Benioff extended Salesforce's offerings in the early 2000s with the idea of a platform that allowed developers to create applications.

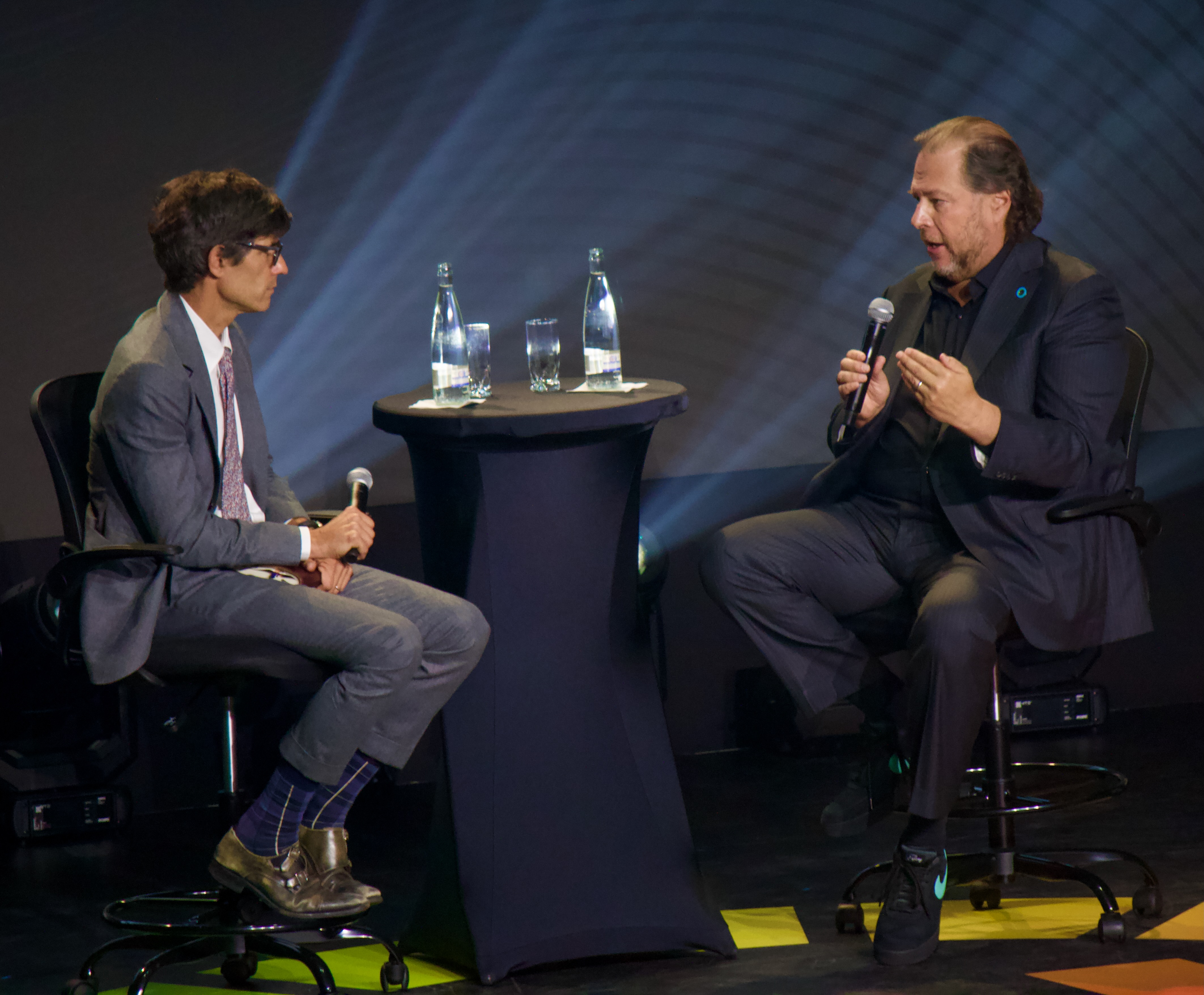
Nicholas Thompson and Benioff at AI for Good 2025

In November 2021, Benioff became co-CEO of Salesforce when Bret Taylor's promotion to co-CEO was announced. One year later, Bret Taylor stepped down as Salesforce co-CEO, leaving Marc Benioff as sole CEO again.

In January 2023, Benioff announced the mass dismissal of approximately 7,000 Salesforce employees via a two-hour all-hands meeting over a call, a course of action he later admitted had been a "bad idea".As of 2024, Salesforce is one of the biggest employers in San Francisco and the anchor tenant of Salesforce Tower, the tallest building in San Francisco.

In early 2023, Salesforce invested approximately $50 million in Anthropic's Series C investment round, and as of 2026, their committed capital to the company was over $300 million.

In September 2025, Benioff reduced Salesforce's support workforce from 9,000 to about 5,000 employees because he "need[ed] less heads". Salesforce stated that AI agents now handle half of all customer interactions and have reduced support costs by 17% since early 2025. The company added it had redeployed hundreds of employees into other departments within the company, including hiring 20% more account executives to meet growing customer demand.

The decision contrasted with Benioff's earlier remarks suggesting that artificial intelligence would augment, rather than replace, white-collar workers. It follows similar workforce reductions at Microsoft and Klarna to automate human jobs.Benioff said that layoffs across companies could be traced to issues such as out of control costs and data center financial commitments, in addition to genuine AI-driven rebalancing. Others called attention to "AI washing", with people blaming AI for layoffs that would otherwise be happening.In May 2026, Salesforce continued to have a freeze on hiring engineers, but continued to hire sales representatives.

=== Time magazine ownership ===
On September 16, 2018, Marc and his wife Lynne bought Time for $190 million.

=== Venture capital fund ===
In 2019, Benioff started Time Ventures, a venture capital fund that has invested in multiple companies, including Commonwealth Fusion Systems, Universal Hydrogen and NCX. In 2021, Time Ventures backed companies, Planet Labs and IonQ, went public.

=== Books ===
Benioff has co-written four books about business and technology. In 2004, he co-wrote Compassionate Capitalism: How Corporations Can Make Doing Good an Integral Part of Doing Well with Karen Southwick. In 2006, he co-wrote The Business of Changing the World: 20 Great Leaders on Strategic Corporate Philanthropy with Carlye Adler. In 2009, he co-wrote Behind the Cloud: The Untold Story of How Salesforce.com Went from Idea to Billion-Dollar Company and Revolutionized an Industry, also with Carlye Adler. In 2019, he again co-wrote Trailblazer: The Power of Business as the Greatest Platform for Change, with Monica Langley. The book became a New York Times bestseller.

=== Other work ===
Benioff is on the board of trustees at the World Economic Forum and USC. Benioff is a member of the Business Roundtable, an advocacy group of CEOs, and The Business Council. As of February 2022, Benioff had an estimated net worth of US$8.31 billion according to Bloomberg Billionaires Index.

== Awards and recognition ==
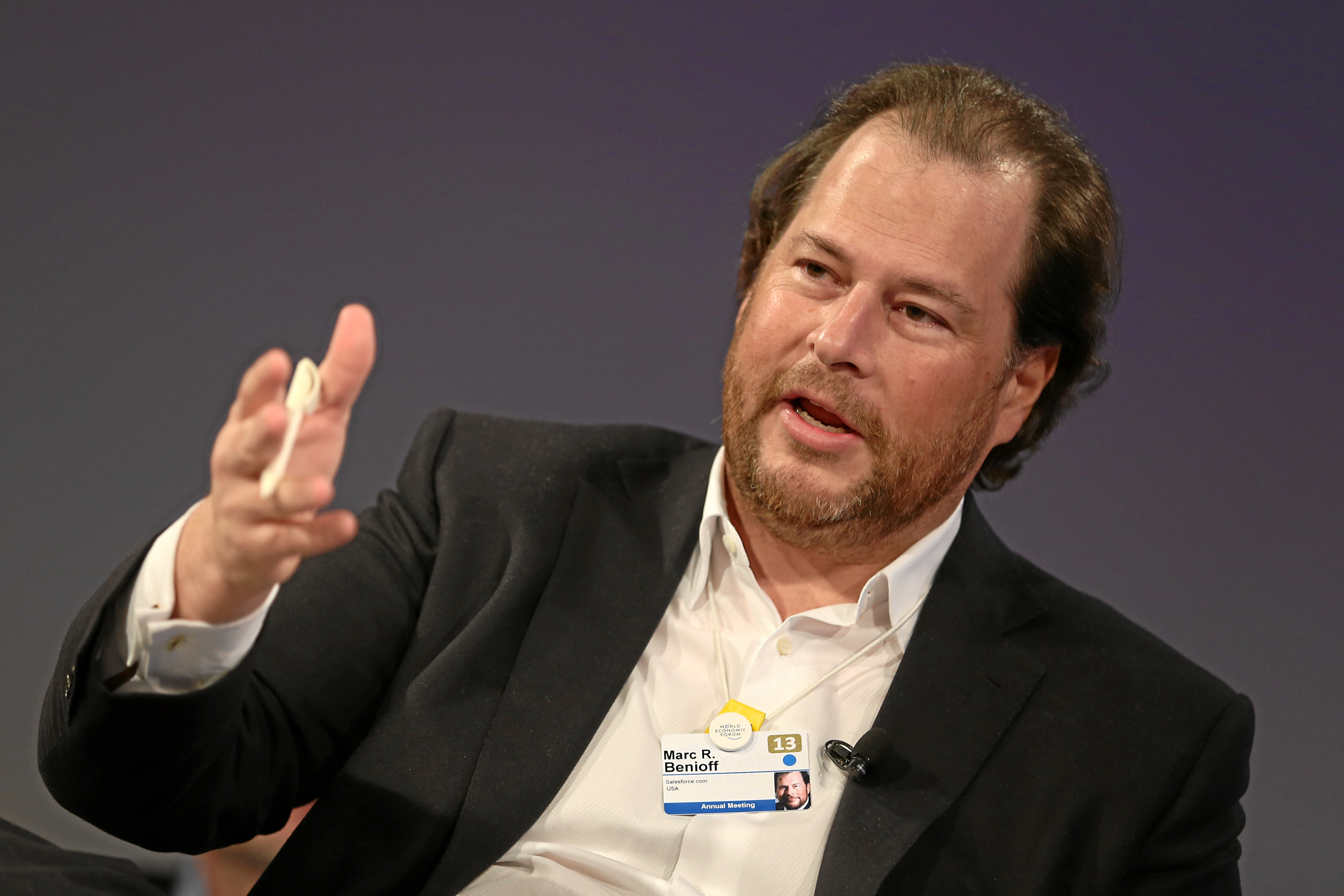
Benioff during the WEF 2013

In 2003, President George W. Bush appointed Benioff co-chair of the President's Information Technology Advisory Committee. In 2009, Benioff was named a Young Global Leader by the World Economic Forum, and is a member of its board of trustees. In 2012, he was named one of the "Best CEOs in the World" by Barron's and received The Economist's Innovation Award. In 2014, Fortune readers voted him "Businessperson of the Year." In 2016, Fortune named him one of the "World's 50 Greatest Leaders." In 2019, he was recognized as one of the 10 Best-Performing CEOs by Harvard Business Review, and was elected to be a member of the National Academy of Engineering.

Benioff was named CNN Business CEO of 2020, and alongside his wife, received the George H.W. Bush Points of Light award. He was also named Chief Executive's CEO of the Year in 2022.

He was appointed a Knight of the Legion of Honour by the French government in 2022. In 2026, he was named to The Chronicles of Philanthropy’s Top 50 list for the 11th time, and was awarded Yale School of Management's Legend in Leadership award.

== Philanthropy ==
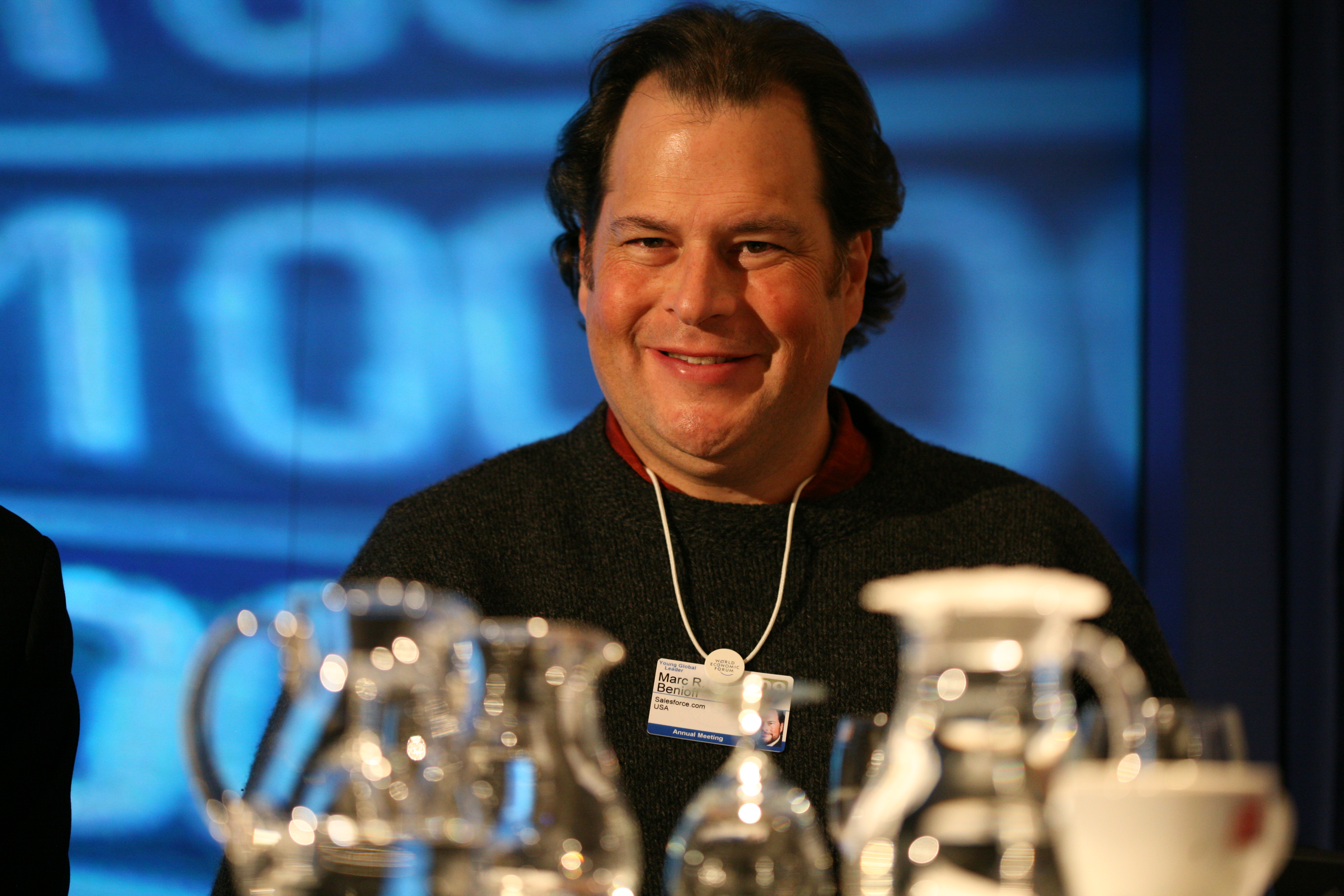
Benioff in 2009

In addition to founding Salesforce in 1999, Benioff also founded the Salesforce Foundation. The foundation uses a "1-1-1" approach to corporate philanthropy, where the company gives one percent of employee time as volunteer hours, one percent of its product and one percent of its revenue to charitable causes. In 2014, Benioff and Scott Farquhar founded Pledge 1%, a San Francisco-based nonprofit focused on this concept.

From 2010 to 2019, the Benioffs donated a total of $275 million to UCSF Children's Hospital, to fund research, and to create the UCSF Benioff Center for Microbiome Medicine. They donated an additional $100 million to the hospital in October 2025 to support facility expansion and modernization in Oakland, California. This donation was part of a larger $139 million donation given by the couple and Salesforce, aimed at helping STEM education and AI literacy efforts in the San Francisco Bay Area. They have also donated $10 million to Stanford University for the Microbiome Therapies Initiative, and $35 million to the University of California, San Francisco, to establish a prostate cancer research initiative.

Since 2016, Benioff has donated over $88 million as part of the Benioff Ocean Science Initiative at the University of California at Santa Barbara.

In January 2020, Benioff announced that he and his wife would provide financial backing for 1t.org to support a global initiative to plant and conserve 1 trillion trees over the next decade.

Benioff procured 50 million pieces of personal protective equipment for hospitals and COVID-19 first responders in the United States in March 2020.

The Benioffs were founding partners of Prince William's Earthshot Prize. In 2021, they were founding members of the World Economic Forum's Friends of Ocean Action initiative, and later pledged a $300 million donation to plant trees and fund ecologically focused entrepreneurs. The Benioffs also pledged $12 million to the National Fish and Wildlife Foundation over a five-year period (2022–2027) to support cleanup of the Midway Atoll.

In 2024, Marc Benioff succeeded Warren Buffett as host of GLIDE’s annual charity lunch auction, raising $200,100 and a $1.5M pledge. The winner chose to remain anonymous. In 2025, Benioff returned, and the auction was won by AI entrepreneur Yi Shi, a previous Buffett lunch attendee in 2015. All proceeds support GLIDE’s anti-poverty work in San Francisco.

== Social activism ==
=== Abortion ===
In September 2021, Benioff announced that Salesforce would relocate any Texas employees who wanted to move after an abortion law went into effect.

=== LGBTQ issues ===
In March 2015, Benioff announced Salesforce would cancel all employee programs and travel in Indiana after the passing of the Religious Freedom Restoration Act. This led to a revised version of the bill being signed into law that prohibited businesses from denying services to someone based on sexual orientation or gender identity.

In February 2016, Benioff announced that Salesforce would reduce investments in Georgia and cancel a conference if HB 757, a bill that would allow businesses to decline services to same-sex couples, was passed. The governor vetoed the bill.

=== Gender pay gap ===
In April 2015, after the issue was raised by Salesforce chief personnel officer Cindy Robbins, Benioff announced that he would review salaries at Salesforce to ensure men and women were paid equally. He subsequently dedicated $8 million between 2015 and 2017 to "correct compensation differences by gender, race, and ethnicity across the company".

=== Homelessness ===
In a 2018 interview with The Guardian, Benioff criticized other technology industry executives for "hoarding" their money and refusing to help the homeless in the San Francisco Bay Area.

In 2019, the Benioffs donated $30 million to the Center for Vulnerable Populations for the Benioff Homelessness and Housing Initiative to study the impacts of homelessness, housing, and health.

=== Police ===
In July 2023, Benioff stated that San Francisco "will never go back to the way it was before the pandemic" and recommended that city leadership convert old office space into housing and hire more police. He used his platform on X to call for "refunding the police" numerous times in 2023.

=== Social media and AI ===
Benioff has been critical of social media companies and their effects on society. He said in 2018 that "Facebook is the new cigarettes" and called for more regulation. In 2026, he warned about AI risks and said "we cannot let AI be social media 2.0."

== Political activity ==
Benioff was registered as a Republican and later as an independent. He also supported Democrats and hosted a fundraiser for Hillary Clinton's presidential campaign in 2016.

In 2025, Benioff had become a Donald Trump supporter. He called on Trump to send the National Guard into San Francisco, Benioff's hometown, in October 2025, stating he was concerned about crime in San Francisco and a need for more police officers.The comments generated controversy for Benioff, including push-back from San Francisco mayor Daniel Lurie and District Attorney Brooke Jenkins and the resignation of Ron Conway from the Salesforce philanthropic division board. Benioff subsequently apologized for his National Guard comments, stating he made them out of a sense of caution as the city prepared for Salesforce's annual Dreamforce conference. Trump ultimately rescinded plans to bring federal agents into the city after Benioff and Nvidia CEO Jensen Huang asked him not to send them.

== Personal life ==
Benioff is married to Lynne Benioff and has two children. Benioff and his family lived in San Francisco prior to the COVID-19 pandemic; since that time they primarily live in Hawaii, where they have several parcels of land.

Benioff has publicly discussed his Jewish practice of wearing tefillin.

=== Hawaii land ownership ===
In 2022, Marc Benioff and his wife Lynne purchased a 160-acre plot of undeveloped land in Hawaii. In 2024, NPR found that Benioff has purchased more than 600 acres of land in Hawaii. Benioff's purchases have sparked concern among Waimea locals regarding rising housing prices.

According to a Benioff spokesperson, the Benioffs have given away nearly 75 percent of the land they purchased in Hawaii as of March 2024, including a total of 440 acres to the non-profit Hawaii Island Community Development Corporation. In March 2025, Benioff donated $150 million to a group of Hawaii medical organizations to build additional facilities and to link the Hawaii Pacific Health system with other local hospitals.
