= UCSF Medical Center =

Coordinates: 37°45′47.67″N 122°27′29.76″W

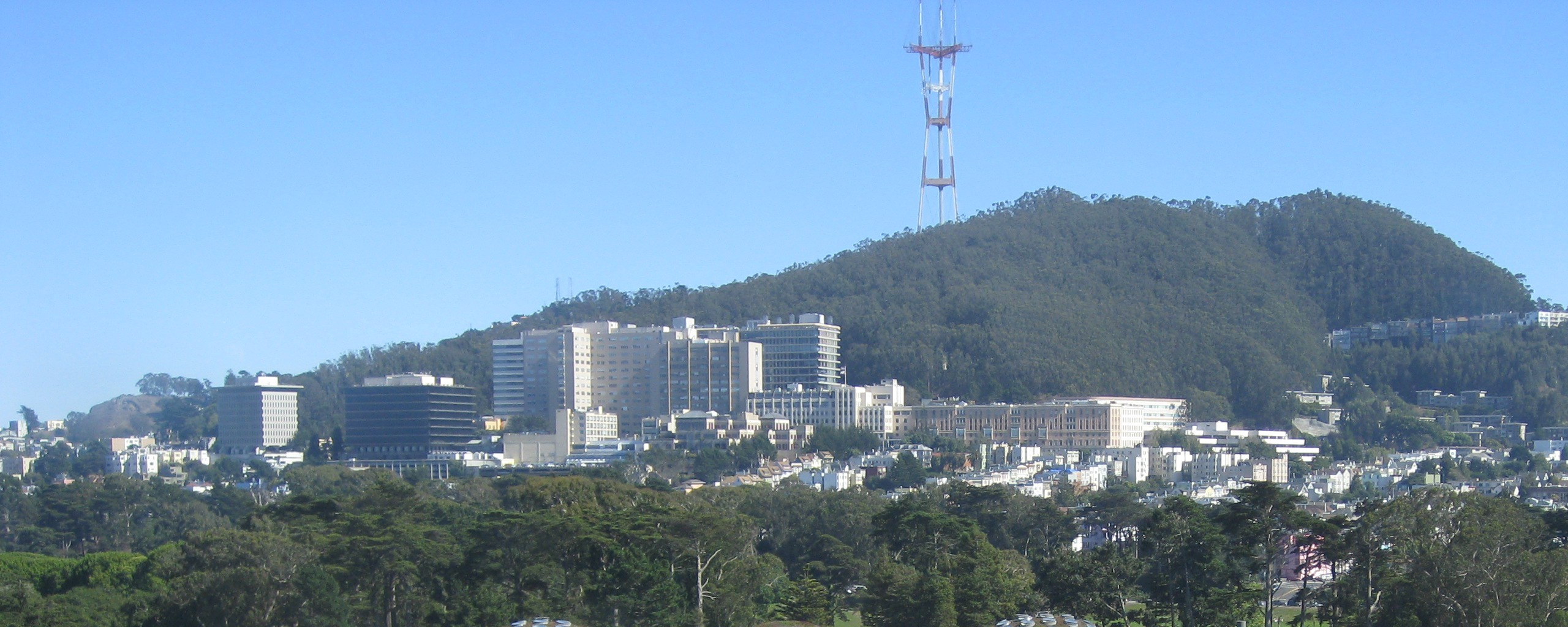
- UCSF Medical Center

Geography
- Location: San Francisco, California, USA

Organisation
- Care system: Public
- Type: Teaching
- Affiliated university: University of California, San Francisco

Services
- Beds: 796

History
- Founded: 1907

Links
- Website: ucsfhealth.org
- Lists: Hospitals in California

The UCSF Medical Center is a teaching hospital in San Francisco, California, and is a medical center of the University of California, San Francisco. It is affiliated with the UCSF School of Medicine and the UCSF Helen Diller Family Comprehensive Cancer Center. UCSF Medical Center is a part of UCSF Health, the healthcare delivery group and care-delivery arm of University of California, San Francisco.

It was founded in 1907 at the site of Parnassus Heights, on Mount Sutro, following the 1906 earthquake, and it was the first hospital in the University of California system. The university acquired Mount Zion Hospital in 1990, which became the second major clinical site and since 1999 has hosted the first comprehensive cancer center in Northern California. Beginning in 2001, the university expanded in the Mission Bay neighborhood and added a new medical center with three new hospitals.

== History ==
Within a month of the devastating 1906 San Francisco earthquake, the faculty of the medical school voted to make room in their building for a teaching hospital by moving the departments responsible for the first two years of preclinical instruction across San Francisco Bay to the Berkeley campus.

In March 1907, the new hospital opened with 75 beds. The immediate need for nurses to staff the new facility led to the founding of the UCSF nursing school.

In 1949, the UC Hospital was officially renamed the "University of California Medical Center."

Mount Zion Hospital, which had opened in 1897, merged with UCSF in 1990.

The medical center received a philanthropic donation of $100 million from Chuck Feeney in February 2015, the largest gift by an individual in the history of the UC system. In 2018, UCSF received a commitment of $500 million for the construction of a new hospital, which will be built at Parnassus, replacing the Langley Porter Psychiatric Institute.

== Facilities ==
=== Parnassus ===
UCSF Helen Diller Medical Center at Parnassus Heights is located on the main campus of UCSF and includes the 600-bed teaching hospital of the same name along with extensive research labs, the main branch of the UCSF Library, and is home to the UCSF School of Medicine, UCSF School of Nursing, UCSF School of Dentistry, and UCSF School of Pharmacy.

In June 2013, Becker's Hospital Review listed the UCSF Medical Center at Parnassus as the 9th highest grossing hospital in America with a gross revenue of $6.88 billion.

=== Mission Bay ===
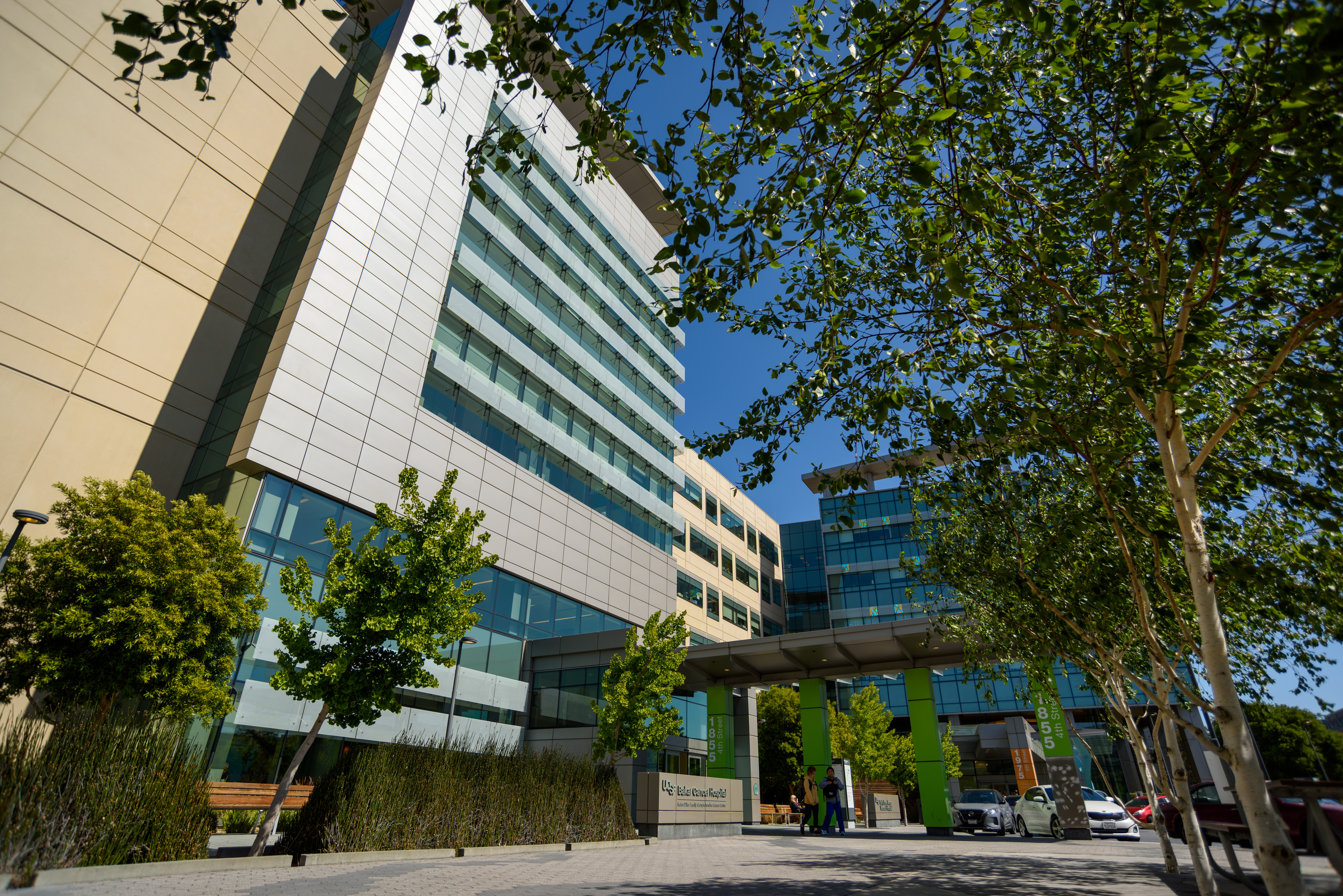
The facade of and one entrance to UCSF Mission Bay campus

UCSF Medical Center at Mission Bay opened February 1, 2015 and hosts three hospitals (UCSF Benioff Children's Hospital, UCSF Betty Irene Moore Women's Hospital, and UCSF Bakar Cancer Hospital) and an outpatient facility. Overall, the 6-story medical center covers 878,000-square-foot and has 289 beds. It also has 4.3 acres of green space, including 100,000 square feet of ground landscaping and 60,000 square feet of rooftop gardens.

=== Mount Zion ===
Mount Zion Hospital was planned in 1887 by members of the Jewish community in San Francisco. It opened in 1897 and gradually became a major center of medical research. It coordinated with local Jewish organizations including the Eureka Benevolent Society (now Jewish Family and Children’s Services), Sinai Memorial Chapel funeral home, and the Federation of Jewish Charities. By the 1980s, the Mount Zion Hospital was struggling financially.

It merged with UCSF in 1989. UCSF Medical Center at Mount Zion now hosts specialty clinics, including the UCSF Comprehensive Cancer Center and the Women's Health Center. Mount Zion includes a Surgery Center with 10 operating rooms and 90 beds.

== Rankings ==
In 2024–25, UCSF Medical Center was ranked as one of the top 20 hospitals in the US by the U.S. News & World Report. UCSF received following ranking in 13 adult medical specialities:

Specialty	Ranking
Cancer	7
Cardiology and Heart Surgery	24
Diabetes and Endocrinology	14
Ear, Nose, and Throat (otolaryngology)	12
Gastroenterology and GI surgery	18
Geriatrics	3
Nephrology	Not Ranked
Neurology and Neurosurgery	3
Obstetrics and Gynecology	32
Ophthalmology	Not ranked
Orthopedics	8
Psychiatry	7
Pulmonology and Lung Surgery	4
Rheumatology	7
Urology	16

== See also ==
- Medical centers in the United States
- UCSF Benioff Children's Hospital
