= MyMichigan Medical Center Saginaw =

- MyMichigan Health

Geography
- Location: Saginaw, Michigan, United States
- Coordinates: 43.4243°N 83.9385°W

Organization
- Care system: Private
- Type: Teaching
- Affiliated university: Central Michigan University College of Medicine Michigan State University College of Human Medicine

Services
- Emergency department: Level II trauma center

History
- Founded: 1875

Links
- Lists: Hospitals in Michigan

MyMichigan Medical Center Saginaw (formerly Ascension St. Mary's Hospital, and St. Mary's of Michigan Medical Center) is a hospital in Saginaw, Michigan, United States. MyMichigan Medical Center Saginaw is certified as a Comprehensive Stroke Center by The Joint Commission. The hospital is a member of MyMichigan Health, and is a teaching affiliate of the Michigan State University College of Human Medicine as well as Central Michigan University. The American College of Surgeons verified the emergency department as a level II trauma center. The 268-bed hospital includes various specialty services, including neurological surgery, critical care, oncology and orthopedics.

== Affiliations ==
MyMichigan Medical Center Saginaw is affiliated locally with the Field Neurosciences Institute, a neurological educational and research facility located in nearby Saginaw Township. Teaching affiliates include Michigan State University's College of Human Medicine and Central Michigan University.

== Facilities ==
In addition to the hospital medical center, MyMichigan Medical Center Saginaw manages outpatient facilities in the area including physician offices and various services such as physical therapy, laboratory and radiology. Towne Centre, an ambulatory care center located in Saginaw Township, provides for outpatient treatment and surgeries as well as staffing a 24-hour emergency department.

== History ==
In 1873, the pastor of St. Mary's Catholic Church in East Saginaw, Fr. Francis van der Bom, requested that the Daughters of Charity of Saint Vincent de Paul open a hospital in Saginaw. The facility opened after the arrival of four sisters of the Daughters of Charity on August 22, 1874. The original frame building on the east side of Saginaw soon proved inadequate; in 1875 a new building was begun on the site and the hospital incorporated as St. Mary's. Its first patients were principally injured lumbermen. The staff devised a health insurance plan of $5 a year to raise funds.

The hospital continued to expand and modernize to care for more patients as well as to provide an increasing variety of medical and educational facilities. In 1928, a new building was dedicated, adding an emergency room, 4 operating rooms, a medical library, and bringing the total of beds to 156. A new facility was opened in 1961, following the demolition of the 1892 building.

Flightcare, a medical emergency helicopter transfer service, was based at St. Mary's beginning in 1987. The St. Mary's burn unit was opened in 1975. The first open heart surgery in the region was performed at St. Mary's on Sept. 10, 1984.

On November 1, 1999, the Daughters of Charity National Health System merged with the Sisters of Saint Joseph to form Ascension Health. The Saginaw hospital was renamed as Ascension Saint Mary's.

As of August 1, 2024, the hospital has been renamed My Michigan Medical Center - Saginaw, having been previously acquired by MyMichigan Health group from Ascension Health.
