= UCSF Bakar Cancer Hospital =

- UCSF
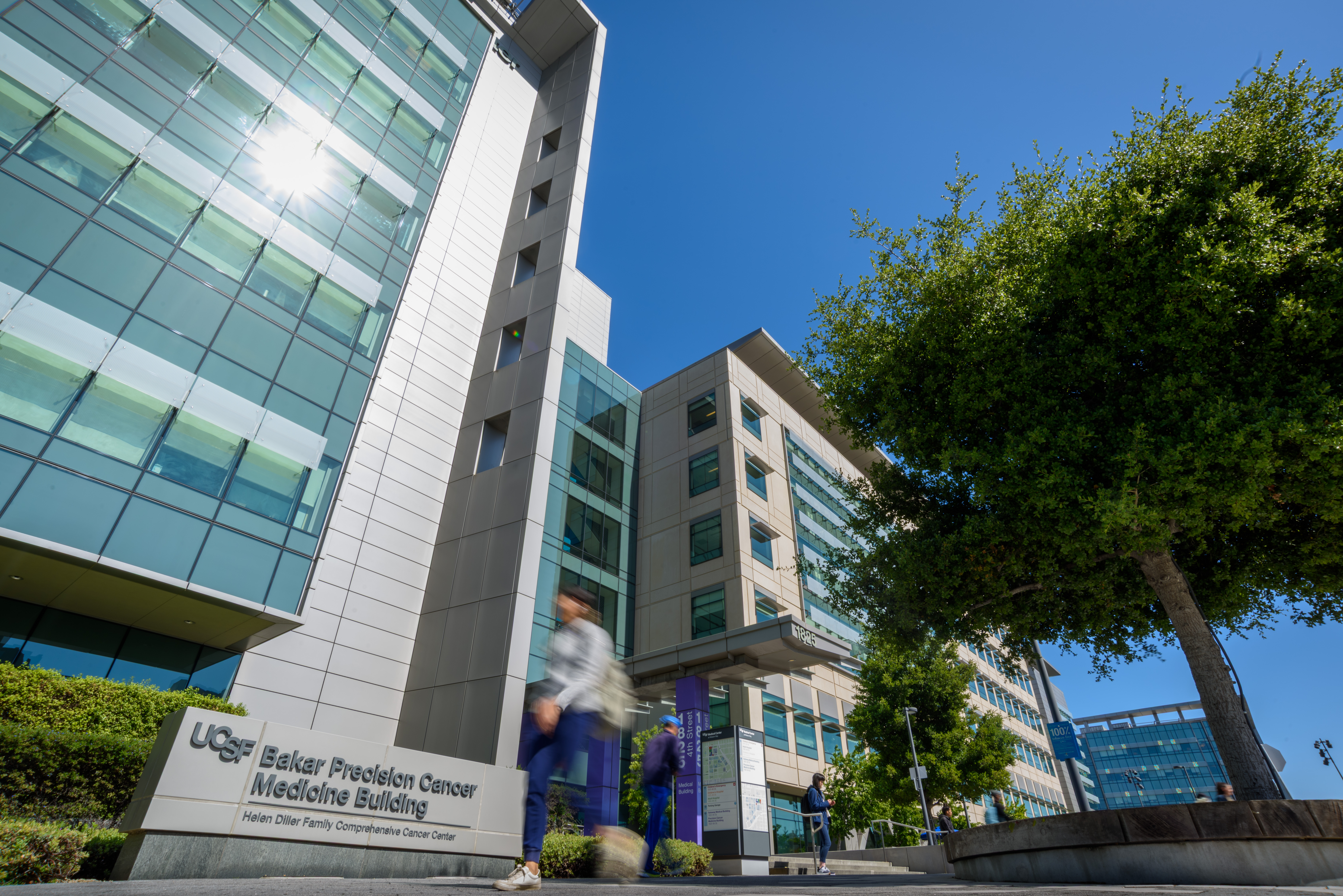

Geography
- Location: San Francisco, California
- Coordinates: 37.766278°N 122.390230°W

Organisation
- Care system: Private
- Type: Teaching
- Affiliated university: UCSF
- Patron: Gerson Bakar

Services
- Beds: 70

Links
- Website: www.ucsfmissionbayhospitals.org/cancer/

UCSF Bakar Cancer Hospital is a cancer hospital in San Francisco, California, part of the University of California, San Francisco health system. It is part of the UCSF Medical Center campus of Mission Bay. Opened on February 1, 2015, part of a $1.5 billion project. It received the highest level of research funding among California cancer centers from the National Cancer Institute.
