= UCSF Benioff Children's Hospital =

- UCSF

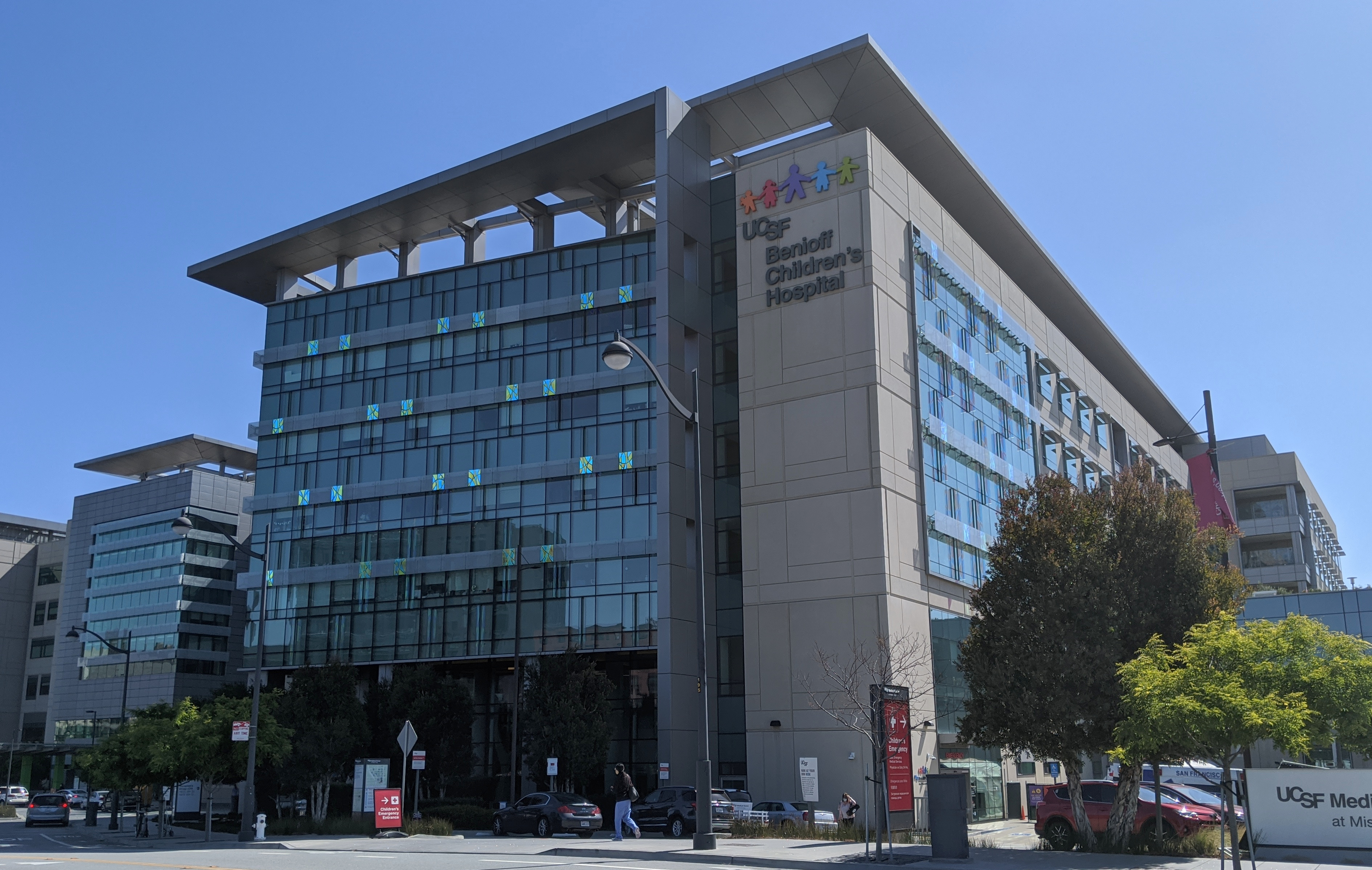
- UCSF Benioff Children's Hospital, Mission Bay (in 2020)

Geography
- Location: Oakland, California, United States
- Coordinates: 37.8372°N 122.2670°W

Organization
- Type: Teaching
- Affiliated university: UCSF
- Patron: Marc Benioff

Services
- Beds: 183
- Speciality: Children's hospital

Helipads
- Helipad: 1

Links
- Website: www.ucsfbenioffchildrens.org
- Lists: Hospitals in California

UCSF Benioff Children's Hospital is a children's hospital system in San Francisco and Oakland, California, affiliated to the University of California, San Francisco. The hospital is a quaternary research and teaching hospital. A quaternary care hospital is the highest designation for facilities that can treat the most complex and specialized conditions. UCSF's mission includes research in addition to care delivery, as UCSF is the largest public recipient of NIH funding nationwide in FY 2023. The hospital complex occupies an entire city block, totaling over one million square feet (878 000 square foot Medical Center and 179 600 square foot Precision Cancer Medical Building), comprising the Benioff Children's Hospital, Betty Irene Moore Women's Hospital, Gateway Medical Building (hosting 15 pediatric and 15 adult operating rooms, Sterile Processing Department, Sterile Core, and Pediatric Infusion Center, among others), and the UCSF Bakar Precision Cancer Medicine Building.

== History ==
In June 2010, Marc Benioff and his wife Lynne announced a $100 million gift to UCSF Children's Hospital with the goal of not only seeing the new hospital built but significantly advancing children's health worldwide.

In 2014, Children's Hospital Oakland affiliated with UCSF Benioff Children's Hospital.

In 2016, the UCSF Children's Hospital was ranked among the top 25 in 8 out of 10 hospital specialties in the U.S News & World Report’s best pediatric hospitals listing.

In 2020, all of UCSF Benioff Children's Hospitals placed nationally in all 10 ranked pediatric specialties on U.S. News & World Report.

== Facilities ==
=== UCSF Benioff Children's Hospital San Francisco ===
UCSF Benioff Children's Hospital San Francisco is a pediatric acute care hospital located in San Francisco, California. The hospital has 183 beds and 50 bassinets. The hospital is affiliated with the UCSF School of Medicine. The hospital provides comprehensive pediatric specialties and subspecialties to pediatric patients aged 0–21 throughout Northern California and beyond. UCSF Benioff Children's Hospital San Francisco also features a pediatric emergency department with 19 treatment rooms and two large resuscitation bays. The Children's hospital has eight units, an Intensive Care Nursery, a Pediatric Cardiac Intensive Care Unit, a Pediatric Intensive Care Unit, a Cardiac Transitional Care Unit, a Transitional Care Unit, a Pediatric Medical/Surgical Unit, a Hematology and Oncology Unit, and a Blood and Marrow Transplant Unit. There is also an adult hospital in the same building with Intensive Care, Surgical, and Acute Care Units.

The hospital has a gross square footage of over one million square feet, comprising the 878,000 square foot hospital and 170,000 square foot Cancer Center. The hospital is the only hospital in San Francisco that has a helipad. Patient rooms feature large windows for increased access to natural light and outdoor garden views. The hospital also operates a Child Life Program within the hospital staffed with Child Life Specialists, Art Therapists, Music Therapists, and other specialized personnel, designed to help support the development of children receiving care at the hospital. Modalities used include Art Therapy, a CCTV system supporting an in-building TV channel and TV production studio, a School Program with credentialed teachers, and a Facility Dog Program, among others. The classroom is fully accredited by the San Francisco Unified School District for patients and siblings in grades K-12 for child schooling.

The hospital hosts a nearby Family House and onsite Ronald McDonald House for families to sleep under the same roof as their child. Additionally, family rooms with showers, laundry, meal services, snack options, and staff are available to families at the hospital. The hospital also offers interactive mobile science exhibits designed by San Francisco's Exploratorium that can be wheeled into a patient's room for private playtime.

In 2026, the hospital opened a new unit on the ground floor of the hospital specifically for children with neurologic and neurosurgical needs requiring acute care. The specialty unit, called the Children's Neuroscience Specialty Unit, has eight beds and operates 24/7.

=== UCSF Benioff Children's Hospital Oakland ===
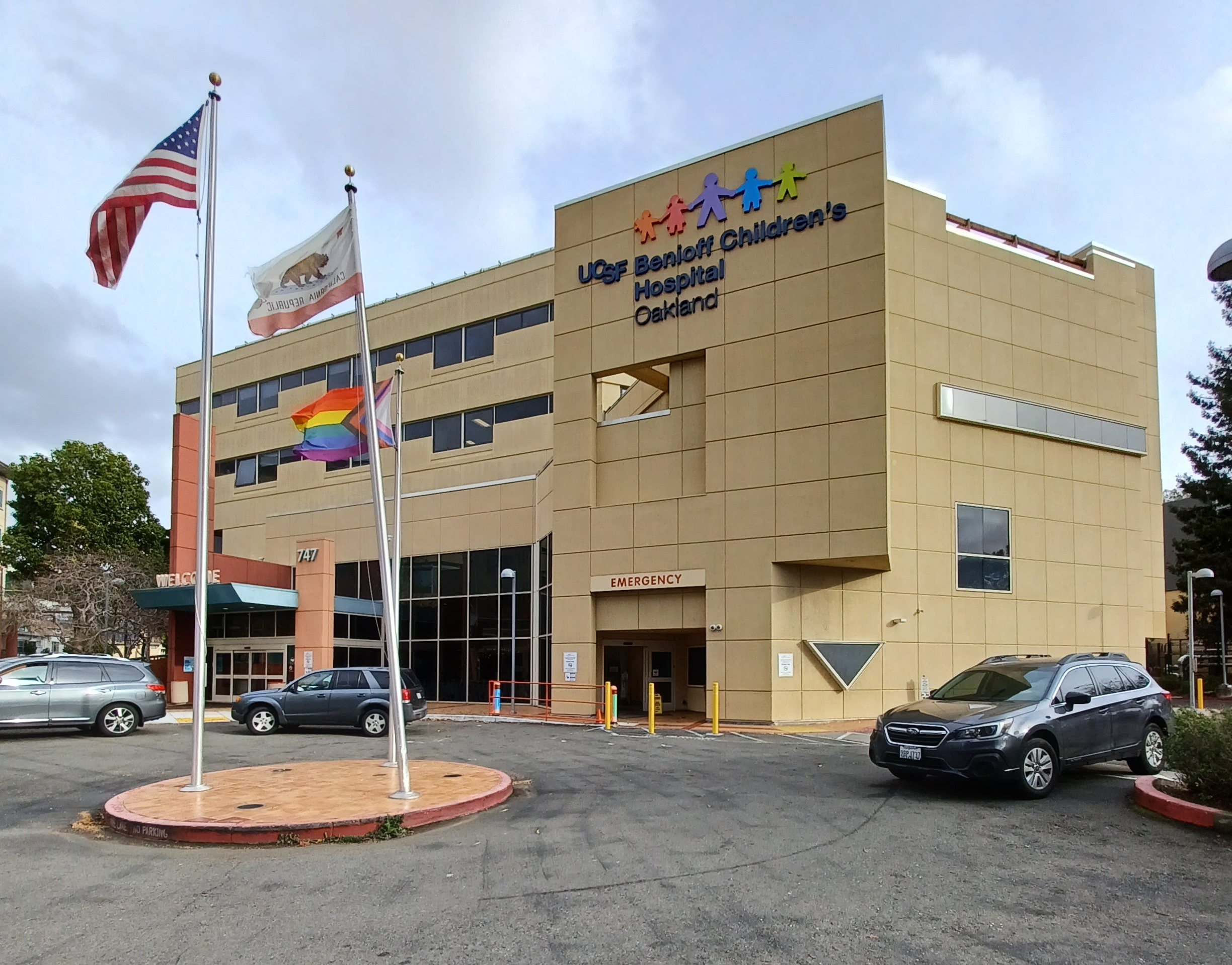
UCSF Benioff Children's Hospital Oakland

UCSF Benioff Children's Hospital Oakland, formerly known as Children's Hospital Oakland, is a pediatric acute care hospital located in Oakland, California. The hospital has 191 beds and is affiliated with the UCSF School of Medicine. The hospital provides comprehensive pediatric specialties and subspecialties to infants, children, adolescents, and young adults aged 0–21 throughout Northern California. UCSF Benioff Children's Hospital Oakland also features a Level 1 Pediatric Trauma Center, 1 of 5 in the state.
