= Midland Mall =

Shopping mall in Midland, Michigan, United States

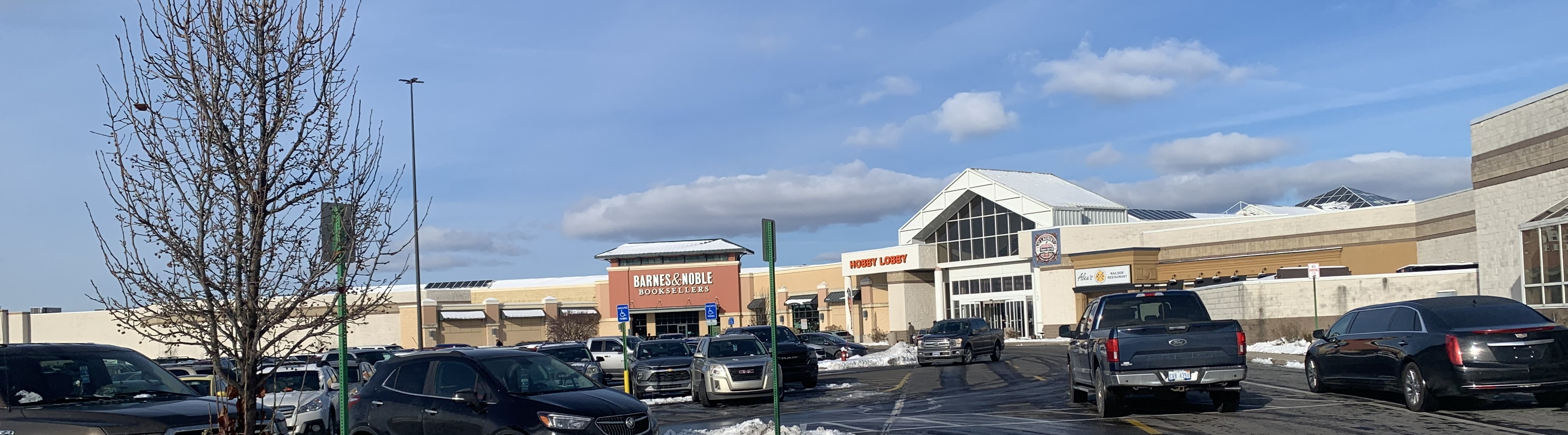
- The western side of the mall in December 2024
- Location: Midland, Michigan, United States
- Coordinates: 43.6596°N 84.2428°W
- Address: 6800 Eastman Avenue
- Opened: October 9, 1991; 35 years ago
- Developer: Jacobs Visconsi Jacobs, Frankel Associates
- Manager: Jordan Dice
- Owner: Jordan Dice
- Num. of stores: 50
- Num. of anchor tenants: 6
- Floor area: 568,145 square feet (53,000 m^{2})
- Floors: 1

Midland Mall is an enclosed shopping mall in Midland, Michigan, United States. The mall features over 50 stores, with Barnes & Noble, Dunham's Sports, Hobby Lobby, Ross Dress for Less, Planet Fitness, and Target serving as anchor stores. MyMichigan Health also has a health clinic at the mall in a former Sears store. Originally planned in the late 1970s, the property was developed by Jacobs Visconsi Jacobs (also known as Jacobs Group) and Frankel Associates. It opened for business on October 9, 1991, with Target, Sears, JCPenney, and Elder-Beerman as its original anchor stores. Barnes & Noble and Steve & Barry's were respectively added in 2003 and 2004, with the latter closing in 2008 and becoming Dunham's Sports in 2011. Elder-Beerman converted to Younkers in 2016, and Sears closed that same year, followed by JCPenney in 2017 and Younkers in 2018. CBL Properties acquired the mall from Jacobs Group in 2001, and sold it to Kohan Retail Investment Group in 2018. Since 2023, the mall has been owned by Jordan Dice.

== Development ==
In December 1976, Troy, Michigan-based real estate developer Samuel Frankel purchased an 83-acre (34 ha) plot of land at the northeast corner of US 10 and Eastman Avenue in what was then part of Larkin Township, just north of the city of Midland. Interstate Properties, a real estate company based in Clifton, New Jersey, put in a three-year option to buy up to 50 acres (20 ha) of Frankel's property to build a shopping mall. At the time, Larkin Township did not have its own sewer or water systems, and the city of Midland had a policy that it would not provide those services to sites outside the city limits without annexing them. Three months later, Larkin Township's zoning board held a public hearing regarding the potential rezoning of the land to commercial use. Although Interstate Properties representative Saul Silverman stated that the company was seeking options for sewer and water treatment that would not require annexation, township residents expressed concerns that the city would annex the site after the mall had opened. Another concern addressed by residents was the potential of traffic backups along Eastman Avenue. After the rezoning plan was declined in June 1978, Interstate Properties submitted a second plan two months later. Under the second plan, the company would build its own waste treatment plant so that annexation would no longer be necessary. Interstate Properties intended for the mall to consist of about 40 shops and two anchor stores. This second plan was passed by the township that October, but it was declined by Midland County's planning commission, who wanted shopping centers to be built only within the city limits. Interstate Properties withdrew their rezoning plans in February 1979.

As Frankel still owned the land, he chose in June 1979 to submit his own plan to build a 1,250,000-square-foot (116,000 m^{2}) mall along with annexation. Frankel's plans were delayed throughout 1980 due to its conflict with an existing petition by a number of Larkin Township residents who sought to annex the entire township to the city of Midland, as well as slow progress on retail developments elsewhere in Midland due to high interest rates on mortgages. Although the petition to annex the entire township was denied in October 1981, Frankel successfully petitioned to annex the site of the proposed mall in August 1983. Fifteen township residents filed a petition with Midland County Circuit Court that same month to prevent annexation. The courts ruled against the residents by year's end, stating that concerns over possible environmental damage and increased traffic were contingent on the development of the mall, and not the annexation itself. By 1985, Frankel had reduced the proposed mall's size to 525,000 square feet (48,800 m^{2}), owing to the cancellation of a nuclear power plant then under construction in the city. The mall would include about 50 shops and three anchor stores, and was tentatively to be named Eastman Mall. In addition, Frankel's plans called for the construction of a Meijer store to the east, as well as a hotel to the north. Frankel submitted plans to the city's planning commission in October 1985, and intended to have it opened by late 1987.

=== Finalization ===
Development had yet to begin by April 1987, due to delays in getting a permit for wetlands around the mall's site. Following approval for this permit by the Michigan Department of Natural Resources (DNR), Frankel announced in April 1988 that his company Frankel Associates would be forming a joint venture with Ohio-based business owner Richard E. Jacobs's firm, the Jacobs Visconsi Jacobs Group, which would oversee construction and management. The firm also developed and owned Fashion Square Mall in nearby Saginaw. Further delaying development at the end of the 1980s was a ruling by the DNR that, to compensate for any wetlands destroyed by the mall's construction, Frankel and associates would have to mitigate wetlands elsewhere in the state. Frankel initially attempted to purchase a potato field located in Hampton Township (in nearby Bay County) for this purpose, but the township's supervisor voted against the purchase in mid-1989. By January 1990, Frankel had successfully negotiated with the Chippewa Nature Center to use land for wetlands mitigation, and confirmed that land clearing for the mall would begin within a month.

Representatives of Jacobs Visconsi Jacobs confirmed in August 1990 the mall would have four anchor stores: Elder-Beerman, JCPenney, Sears, and Target. Of these, Sears would be returning to Midland after closing a previous store in 1984, while JCPenney would be relocating from downtown. Jacobs Visconsi Jacobs representatives also stated that Eastman Avenue would be expanded, and a frontage road constructed to serve the mall. Also by this point, the complex was officially named Midland Mall. Construction began by year's end, starting with the Elder-Beerman, Target, and Sears stores. Also that year, a site plan was approved for the adjacent Meijer store, which was moved to a position north of the mall instead of to its east. Jacobs Visconsi Jacobs representatives confirmed in February 1991 that the mall would include a ten-restaurant food court. Ten businesses filed building permits in June 1991. These were clothing stores J. Riggings, Jeans West, and 5-7-9 (all divisions of Edison Brothers Stores), as well as Lane Bryant, Lerner New York (now called New York & Company), Champs Sports, Foot Locker, Claire's, Wilsons Leather, and local jewelry chain Corey's Jewel Box. Of these, Champs Sports, 5-7-9, and Jeans West did not have any other locations in the Tri-Cities, the region consisting of Midland, Saginaw, and Bay City. A month later, Camelot Music, Sbarro, and clothing chain Rave filed for permits as well.

== Opening and afterward ==
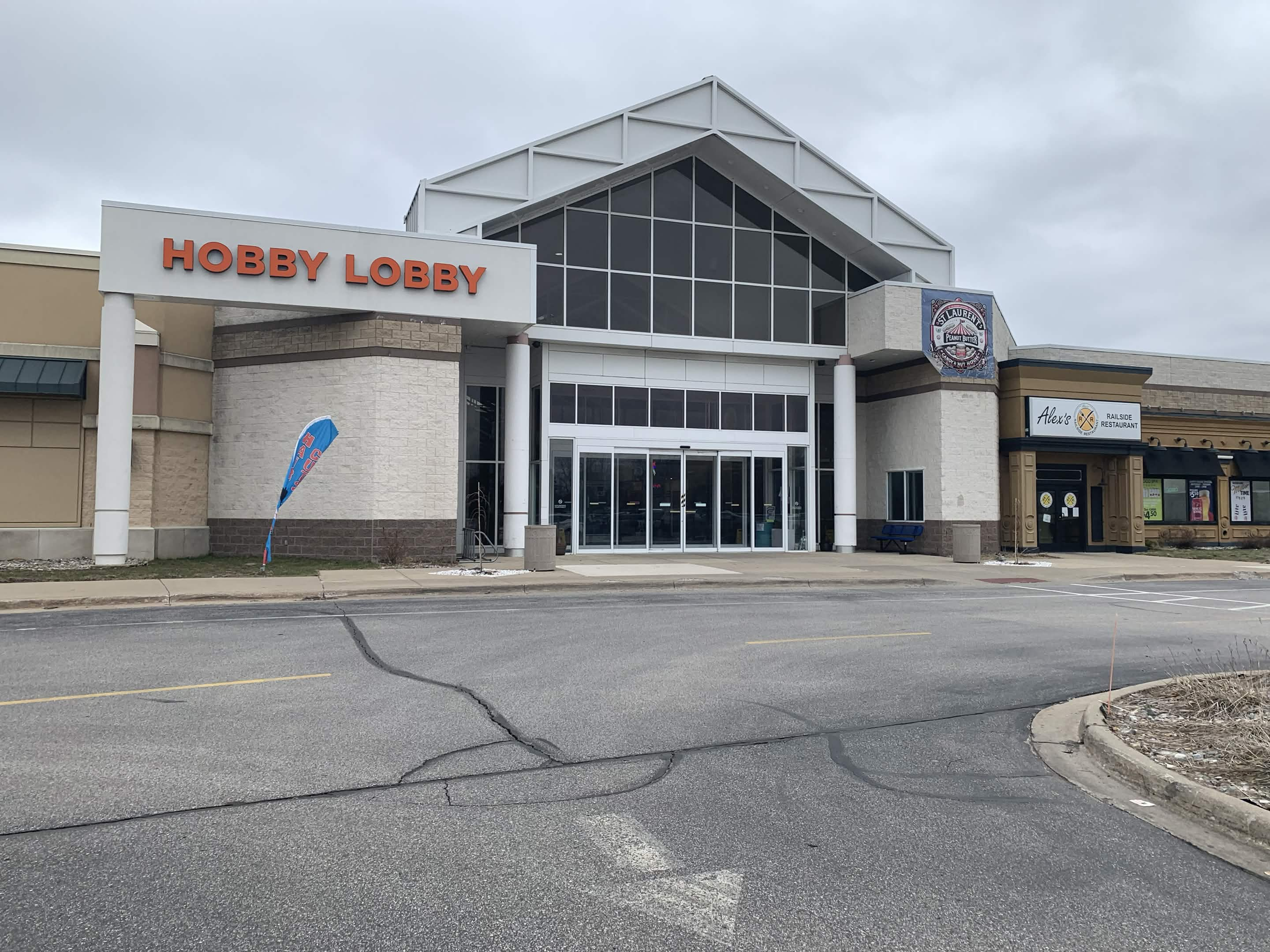
The mall's northwestern entrance in April 2026

Midland Mall opened for business on October 9, 1991. 43 stores operated in the mall on opening day, including all four anchor stores, with plans for as many as 16 more tenants by early 1992. Events on opening day included a ribbon-cutting ceremony, giveaways of $10 gift certificates and shopping bags for customers, and musical performances. At the end of the year, Beth Bellor of the Midland Daily News reported that initial concerns about the mall's long-term success included possible impact on businesses in downtown Midland, as well as diminished shopper traffic in the wake of the early 1990s recession. Despite these initial concerns, Bellor also noted that reception became more favorable as its opening neared, as local business owners felt downtown could sustain itself with "niche" businesses, while the mall itself would keep Midland residents from traveling to Bay City or Saginaw, and would potentially attract shoppers from out of town. Mall merchants also reported favorable sales and traffic for the Christmas 1991 shopping season. Following the mall's development, a new road named Joe Mann Boulevard was constructed to its north, extending easterly to Jefferson Avenue and creating room for future development along the mall's periphery.

In March 1992, further store openings were confirmed for the mall. These included Musicland, Merry-Go-Round, Things Remembered, and Ruby Tuesday. By this point, McDonald's had also opened in the food court. Construction also began on a Toys "R" Us on the mall's periphery, with a targeted opening date of November 1992. On the mall's one-year anniversary in October 1992, the manager reported that all stores had met or exceeded sales expectations, and that the mall itself had ten percent more automobile traffic than projected. In addition, Buckle and TacoTime were projected to open by Christmas. Additionally, business owners in Gladwin, Michigan, to the north of Midland, reported that downtown business had not declined despite a number of residents shopping at the mall. While the director of Gladwin County's chamber of commerce reported that a number of Gladwin residents traveled to Midland to shop at the Meijer adjacent to the mall after it opened in June 1992, she also thought this was due to the "novelty" of the store, and confirmed that a supermarket north of town was undergoing a $1,000,000 renovation, alongside $1,200,000 in renovations to Gladwin's central business district. At the time of the mall's second anniversary in 1993, it had an occupancy of 79 percent. Despite JCPenney briefly cutting its hours earlier in the year, the store's sales recovered by July, and other merchants such as Target, Buckle, and Ruby Tuesday also reported favorable sales. Mall management also noted that more Midland residents had begun to shop at the mall instead of traveling to Saginaw, and that customers also came from other surrounding towns such as Gladwin and Clare. Also contributing to the mall's success at the time were events held in the concourses, such as craft shows, home improvement shows, and a Christmas ornament-making workshop held by 4-H.

Kilwins chocolate shop and TacoTime both closed at the mall in November 1995. A month later, Edison Brothers announced that it would be closing its 5-7-9, J. Riggings, and Jeans West (by then renamed to JW) stores at the mall in early 1996. Mall management noted that the former two closings were "not related to the performance of the mall", which had continued to hold sales above the national average. Additionally, the closure of the Edison Brothers chains was due to that company filing for chapter 11 bankruptcy. Despite these closures, both Bath & Body Works and Avenue opened at the mall late in the year. In October 1996, Dow Chemical Company held a "Celebration of the Century" at the mall, honoring the company's 100th anniversary. This event was open to the public and featured a silent auction, fashion show, food carts, performances by a country music band, and a drawing for Caribbean cruise. A large number of developments occurred around the mall in the late 1990s. These included OfficeMax and Lowe's in 1997, followed by Hampton Inn and Staples in 1998. Additionally, Walmart began construction on a 120,000-square-foot (11,000 m^{2}) behind the mall in late 1998, with a projected opening date of January 1999.

=== 21st century ===
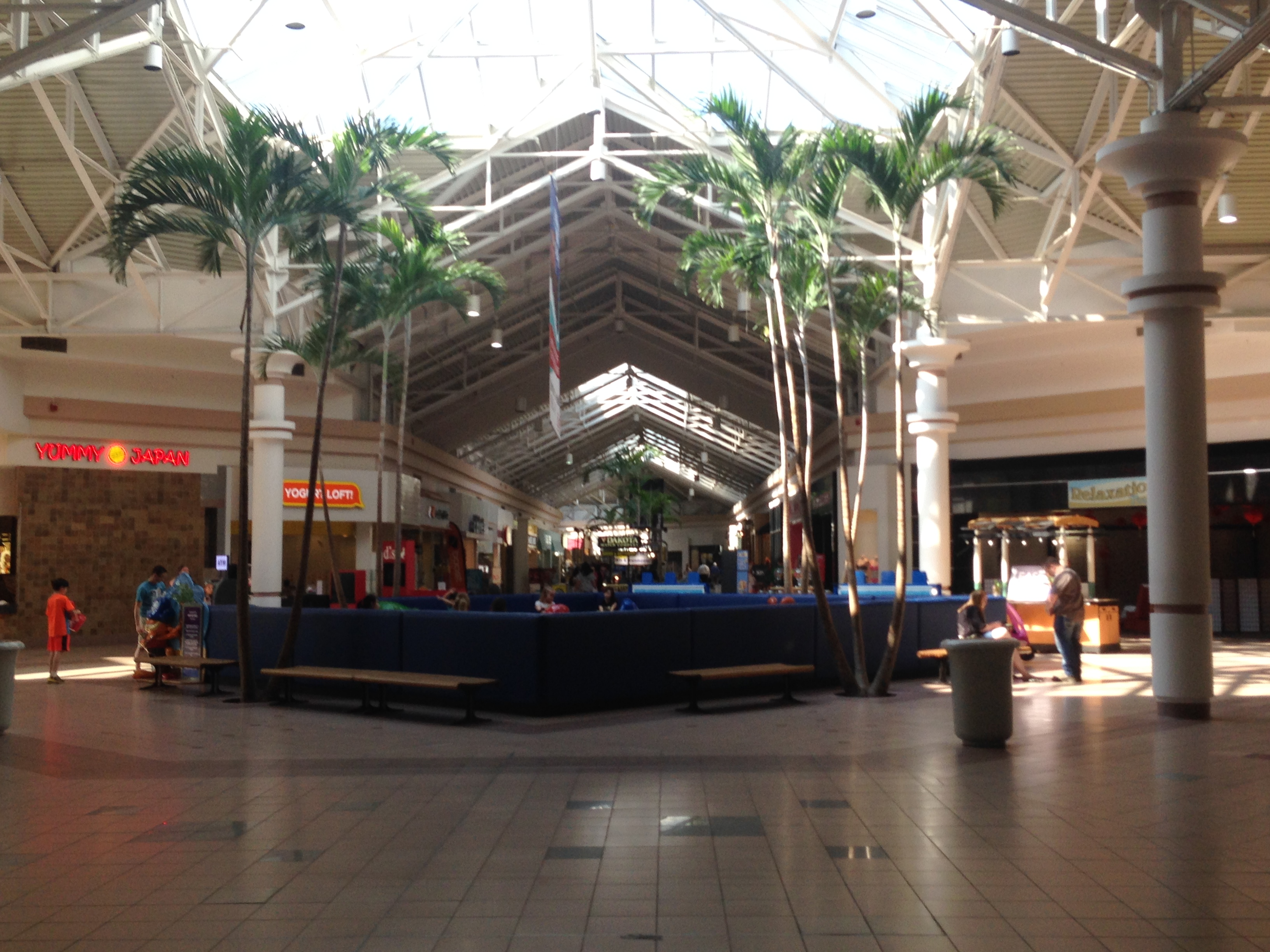
The mall's center court in 2016, since replaced by the Malltopia playplace

The Jacobs group finalized the sale of all of its malls to CBL & Associates Properties (now known as CBL Properties) in February 2001 for $1.2 billion, including both Midland and Fashion Square malls. At the time of the sale, CBL announced that it would likely begin a renovation plan for Midland Mall after acquiring it, as the company usually did so for malls upon reaching their tenth year of operation. One of the first renovations following CBL's acquisition was the addition of a Barnes & Noble bookstore. This location displaced eight smaller storefronts including those of GNC and Hallmark Cards, which both relocated elsewhere in the mall. An Aéropostale clothing store also opened at the mall in this time span, while Target expanded its sales floor space by moving the walls of its storage rooms. Steve & Barry's opened a 26,000-square-foot (2,400 m^{2}) store at the mall in May 2004. Opening ceremonies for the store included a tailgate party with food from Ruby Tuesday, as well as a drawing for a Detroit Red Wings jersey signed by Dominik Hašek. A number of businesses also opened along the mall's periphery between 2003 and 2004, including Home Depot, Best Buy, and Walgreens, while Walmart expanded its store into a supercenter. At the time, a member of Midland's economic development corporation attributed the continued success of the mall and surrounding businesses to the city's low crime rate, as well as the capacity of the city's sewer and water systems.

Between 2007 and 2008, the three malls serving the Tri-Cities (Midland, Fashion Square, and Bay City malls, the last of which is now Bay City Town Center) reported declines in sales due to the Great Recession. Despite the recession, Midland Mall opened a number of new stores in 2008, including Journeys and Vanity. In addition, Victoria's Secret moved to a larger location at Midland Mall, and Auntie Anne's opened pretzel shops at all three malls. Steve & Barry's closed in late 2008 due to the chain filing for bankruptcy. In October 2009, the former location of Steve & Barry's became another sports clothing store called Campus Den. Campus Den and Deb Shops both moved to other spaces in the mall in mid-2011 to make room for Dunham's Sports, which moved from an existing store in Midland, while rue21 also opened in the Sears wing. By this point, Midland Mall reported the highest occupancy rate of the three malls in the Tri-Cities.

In 2012, Elder-Beerman's parent company the Bon-Ton confirmed the Midland Mall store would be renamed to Younkers along with two other stores in Michigan, as market research determined that name to be more suitable for those stores. The Food Network television series Food Court Wars, in which restaurateurs compete to operate a restaurant at a food court rent-free for a year, featured Midland Mall on a 2013 episode. The winning restaurant, a sandwich shop called Chip-n-Wich, opened for business in August 2013. Shoe Show opened a Shoe Dept. Encore store next to Younkers in mid-2015. Sears closed in July 2016 as part of a round of closings by parent company Kmart. The mall underwent foreclosure that same year after defaulting on a loan, leading to Southfield, Michigan-based NAI Farbman taking over financial operations while CBL retained ownership and management. Despite the foreclosure and the vacancy of Sears, mall managers described the property as "healthy". JCPenney announced in March 2017 that it would be closing the Midland Mall store along with six others in Michigan as part of a corporate restructuring. The third anchor to close in as many years was Younkers, which did so in April 2018 due to the bankruptcy of the Bon-Ton.

=== 2018–present: Kohan and sale to Jordan Dice ===
In July 2018, while Younkers was undergoing closure, the mall was bought by Kohan Retail Investment Group for $9,400,000. At the time, it had about 50 stores. J.C. Reindl of the Detroit Free Press contrasted Midland Mall with Eastland Center in the Detroit suburb of Harper Woods, another mall which Kohan purchased around the same time. Reindl described both malls as being in "financial distress." She attributed the financial decline of Midland Mall to provisions in the leases of certain stores, which were allowed to pay lower rent rates due to decreased sales brought on by the loss of the mall's anchor stores. Reindl found both malls to be clean, but thought Eastland had a poorly-maintained parking lot. According to her, one wing of Midland Mall had a number of consecutive vacancies including a Payless ShoeSource which was in the process of closing. She also noted that fewer senior citizens were visiting the mall for walking, due to the closure of the McDonald's in the food court. The mall mitigated a number of chain store losses throughout 2019 by opening local stores and services, including Aaron's Gifts from Home, which assembles CARE packages for members of the military. In early 2020, the former Younkers became a resale store called Fantastic Finds, while Planet Fitness relocated from outside the mall into a portion of the former JCPenney space. A number of stores closed temporarily at the mall during the COVID-19 pandemic starting in March 2020, including Subway, Victoria's Secret, and Ruby Tuesday. The latter two chose not to reopen after COVID-19 restrictions were lifted. Alex's Railside Restaurant relocated from nearby Sanford into the mall in late 2020, taking the former Ruby Tuesday location. MidMichigan Health (now MyMichigan Health) purchased the former Sears location in 2021 for conversion to office spaces, with a targeted opening date of 2022. After Fantastic Finds moved into a smaller space within the mall, its anchor space was confirmed to undergo conversion to a Hobby Lobby.

Jordan Dice, a business owner and investor from Bay City, bought the mall from Kohan in March 2023 at an online auction for just over $5,000,000. Upon buying the mall, Dice stated that he sought to renovate it and attract new tenants. One of the first tenants Dice brought to the mall was a second location of St. Laurent Brothers, a Bay City-based candy store which he also owns. Dice also announced plans to continue attracting new local tenants to the mall, in addition to repairing the parking lot and trimming greenery, as well as improving parking lot lighting and repairing the bathrooms. Shortly after his purchase, a local jewelry store had replaced a closed Kay Jewelers, and a radio station had also opened. Ross Dress for Less opened at the mall in 2024, along with a frozen yogurt shop and a smoothie shop. Both Ross and Planet Fitness occupy the former location of JCPenney. The opening of Ross was followed in 2025 by the construction of Malltopia, a four-level children's playplace inside the mall. Dice cited the playplace as an example of offering amenities beyond retail shops to help maintain the mall's viability. That same year, Dice reported that the mall's occupancy had rebounded to over 90 percent, which he attributed to an emphasis on locally-owned stores, particularly in the food court. Another event held at the mall under Dice's ownership is the annual Midland Mall Comic-Con, a comic book convention held annually inside the mall. In September 2026, the Midland Daily News reported that the mall had achieved 100 percent occupancy.
