= Food Court Wars =

American competitive cooking show

- Genre: Reality television
- Presented by: Tyler Florence
- Country of origin: United States
- Original language: English
- No. of seasons: 2
- No. of episodes: 20

Production
- Executive producers: Gordon Ramsay; Molly O'Rourke; Nicola Moody; Patricia Llewellyn; Ben Alder
- Running time: 42 minutes
- Production company: One Potato Two Potato

Original release
- Network: Food Network
- Release: July 7, 2013 – May 29, 2014

Food Court Wars is an American competitive reality television cooking show on the Food Network that puts two teams of entrepreneurs in a shopping mall together with the teams having to battle each other in order to win a food court restaurant of their own, rent-free, for a year. Each week's show is at a different city mall in the United States. The malls want to open a new "local" eatery in the mall's food court that offer a fresh, region-specific menu. The teams test, market, then run their concept for a full day feeding shoppers. The team restaurant that makes the most profit at the end of the day wins their eatery space, which is a prize worth an estimated $100,000, and the losing team must vacate the premises. The show premiered on July 7, 2013. The first season finale, which was a rebroadcast of the pilot episode, aired on August 18, 2013. Season 2 premiered on February 23, 2014, and consisted of thirteen episodes.

== Summary ==
Food Court Wars pits two teams of food entrepreneurs against one another as they battle to win their own food court restaurant. The team whose restaurant makes the most profit wins their eatery space—a prize worth $100,000.

== Episodes ==
=== Season 1 (2013) ===
No. overall	No. in season	Title	Location	City	Original release date	Prod. code	U.S. viewers (millions)
0	0	"Perkins & Sons vs. Kettle n' Spouts"	Madison Square Mall	Huntsville, Alabama	December 29, 2012	VW0100H	N/A
Pilot re-aired on August 18, 2013, as the first season finale.
1	1	"Suck the Shuck vs. Po'Boy"	Bonita Lakes Mall	Meridian, Mississippi	July 7, 2013	VW0101H	1.54
2	2	"Tirado's Empanadas & More vs. The Taco Spot"	WestGate Mall	Spartanburg, South Carolina	July 14, 2013	VW0102H	1.05
3	3	"Casual Joe's vs. The Wrap Trap"	Wausau Center	Wausau, Wisconsin	July 21, 2013	VW0103H	1.01
4	4	"Oasis vs. Chip-n-Wich"	Midland Mall	Midland, Michigan	July 28, 2013	VW0104H	1.43
Jonathan Neely and Craig Jones, owners of Chip-n-Wich, offered locally-tailored sandwiches with fresh-made potato chips. Diana Hadad and Melania Paster, owner and pastry chef at World Café in Bay City, offered their take on Lebanese cuisine. Chip-n-Wich won the competition and opened to the public on August 5, 2013.
5	5	"Slum Dogz vs. Pimento Jamaican"	Burnsville Center	Burnsville, Minnesota	August 4, 2013	VW0105H	1.20
6	6	"Charleston Gourmet Burger Company vs. Holy City Pizzeria"	Citadel Mall	Charleston, South Carolina	August 11, 2013	VW0106H	1.19

=== Season 2 (2014) ===
No. overall	No. in season	Title	Location	City	Original release date	Prod. code	U.S. viewers (millions)
7	1	"House of Doggs vs. Matts' Beignets"	Grand Traverse Mall	Traverse City, Michigan	February 23, 2014	VW0201H	1.11
8	2	"Fat Shallot vs. Glutton Force 5"	Spring Hill Mall	West Dundee, Illinois	March 2, 2014	VW0202H	0.80
9	3	"Brunchaholics vs. Modern Southern Table"	Colony Square Mall	Zanesville, Ohio	March 9, 2014	VW0203H	1.08
10	4	"The Mayobird vs. Wingzza"	Valley Hills Mall	Hickory, North Carolina	March 16, 2014	VW0204H	0.96
11	5	"Full Circle Sliders vs. Jonathon's Gravy Train"	Vista Ridge Mall	Lewisville, Texas	March 23, 2014	VW0205H	TBA
Full Circle Sliders won the competition but announced in late May 2014 that they would not be opening a location at the mall.
12	6	"Gaufre Gourmet vs. Pressed"	Three Rivers Mall	Kelso, Washington	March 30, 2014	VW0206H	TBA
13	7	"Bistro to Go vs. Southern Traditions"	Pierre Bossier Mall	Bossier City, Louisiana	April 6, 2014	VW0207H	TBA
14	8	"Submarino's vs. Molly's Kitchen"	Cache Valley Mall	Logan, Utah	April 14, 2014	VW0208H	TBA
15	9	"International Grille vs. Sensational Slyders"	The Mall at Turtle Creek	Jonesboro, Arkansas	April 20, 2014	VW0209H	TBA
16	10	"Sabor de San Miguel vs. Ramen Bar"	NewPark Mall	Newark, California	May 4, 2014	VW0210H	TBA
17	11	"Ophelia's vs. Ms. Ney's Gourmet"	Collin Creek Mall	Plano, Texas	May 15, 2014	VW0211H	TBA
18	12	"J's Kitchen vs. Kadook's"	The Mall at Sierra Vista	Sierra Vista, Arizona	May 22, 2014	VW0212H	TBA
19	13	"Mark's Gourmet Dogs vs. Grand Grillin'"	Lansing Mall	Lansing, Michigan	May 29, 2014	VW0213H	TBA
