= The Vista =

The Vista Shopping Center
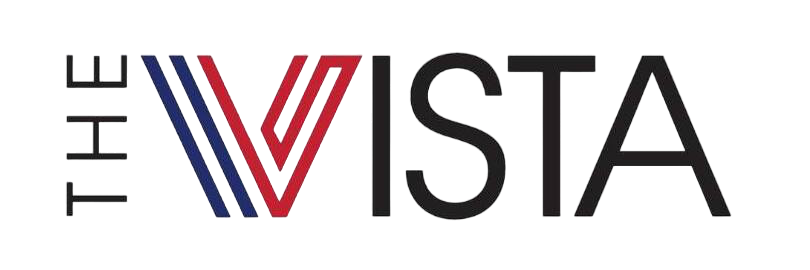

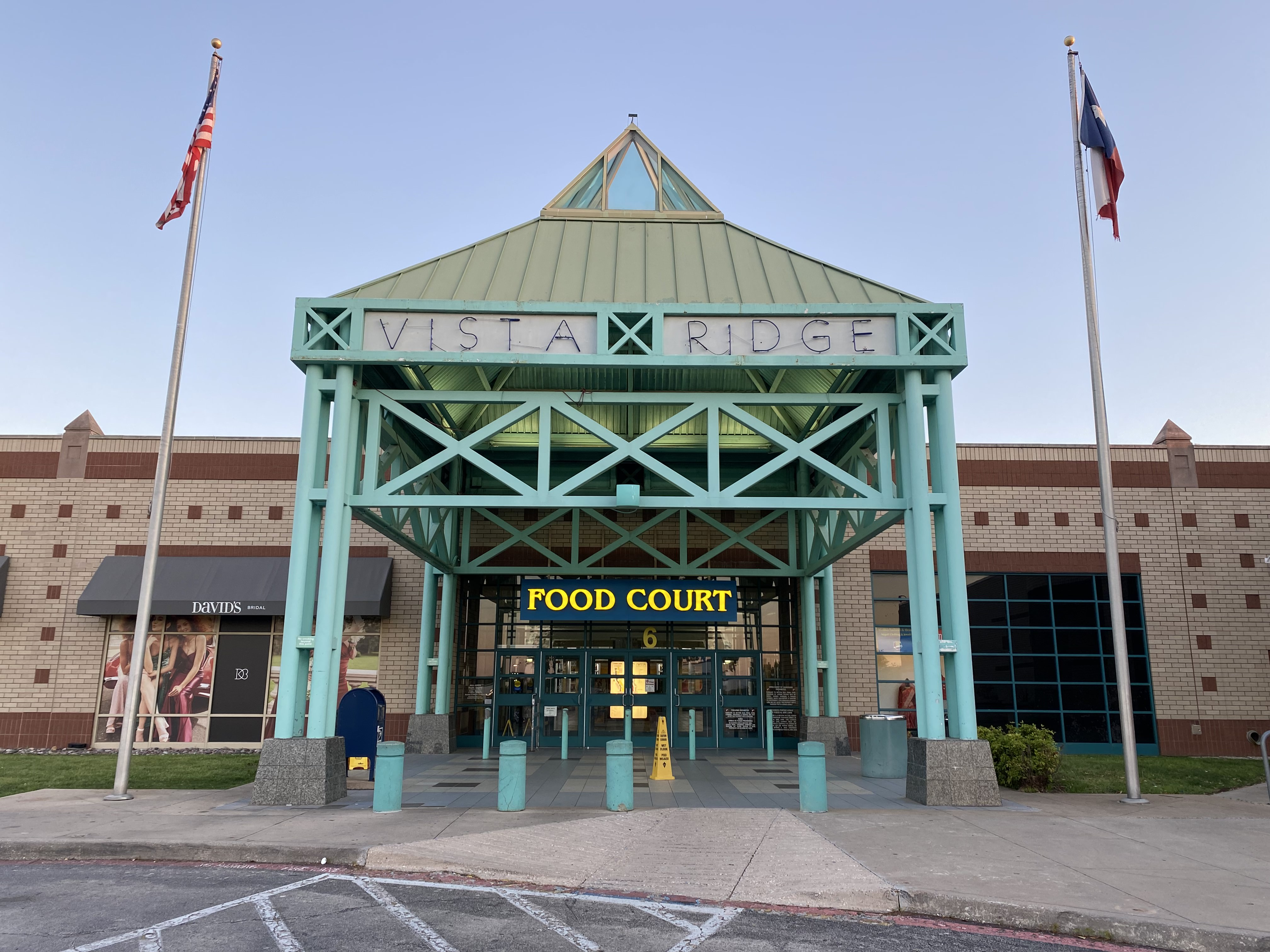
- Mall entrance, c. April 2023
- Location: Lewisville, Texas, United States
- Coordinates: 33°0′9″N 96°58′18″W
- Address: 2401 S Stemmons Fwy, Lewisville, TX 75067
- Opened: October 4, 1989; 37 years ago
- Previous names: Vista Ridge Mall (1989–2017) Music City Mall (2017–2022)
- Developer: Homart Development Company, Herring Marathon Group Inc., and JCP Realty Inc.
- Manager: 1000 South Vermont LLC
- Owner: 1000 South Vermont LLC
- Num. of stores: 59 (As of January 2025)
- Num. of anchor tenants: 5 (4 open, 1 vacant)
- Floor area: 1,046,000 sq ft (97,200 m^{2})
- Floors: 2
- Parking: 6,300
- Website: https://thevistacenter.com

The Vista, formerly Music City Mall, and originally Vista Ridge Mall, is a shopping mall in Lewisville, Texas, United States, owned and managed by 1000 South Vermont LLC. Opened in 1989, it is located on the southwest corner of Round Grove Road and the portion of Interstate 35E known as Stemmons Freeway. As of January 2025, the mall contains 59 businesses. The current anchors are Dillard's Clearance, Cinemark, Zion Market, and NTX Range. The mall contains 1 vacant anchor, which was previously occupied by Macy's.

== History ==
=== Vista Ridge Mall (1989–2017) ===
==== Opening ====
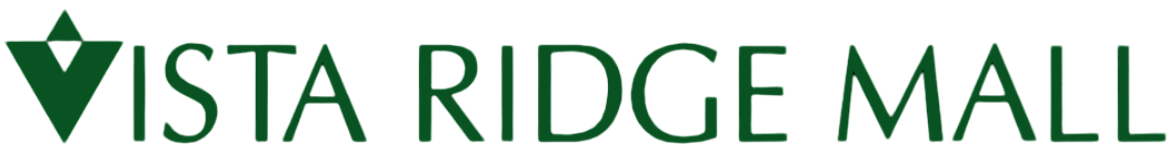
Vista Ridge Mall logo (1989–2017)

The Vista opened on October 4, 1989, as Vista Ridge Mall. A preview party was held the night prior from 6:30PM-8:30 pm, with grand opening ceremonies taking place in the center court on October 4 at 9:30 am. Television host Bob Eubanks presided over the ribbon cutting ceremony. Several other celebrities made appearances at the mall throughout the opening weekend, including Ron Chapman of radio station KVIL, Texas Rangers baseball players Rafael Palmeiro and Julio Franco, Miss Texas Leah Kay Lyle, and Corbin Bernsen of L.A. Law. Upon opening, Vista Ridge Mall was the largest mall in the Southwestern United States.

On October 20, 1989, Cinemark opened its then flagship 12-screen location inside Vista Ridge Mall, with the marquee and ticket office located in the center court. At the time, the theater was the largest in the Dallas-Fort Worth metroplex.

The mall opened with 74 stores, with Sears and Dillard's as the initial anchors. By March 1990, the mall was 65% leased, and an additional 19 stores had opened, including The Gap, Casual Corner, and The Limited. The mall added a third anchor when JCPenney opened its Vista Ridge Mall location on August 1, 1990. The fourth anchor to open was Foley's, a unit of May Department Stores, as part of an expansion push by the chain. The store held its dedication in 1991.

==== 1990s and 2000s ====
In 1991, Vista Ridge Mall underwent interior renovations to make the indoor areas more appealing. The mall has won several architectural design awards, Merit Awards, and International Council of Shopping Centers MAXI Awards.

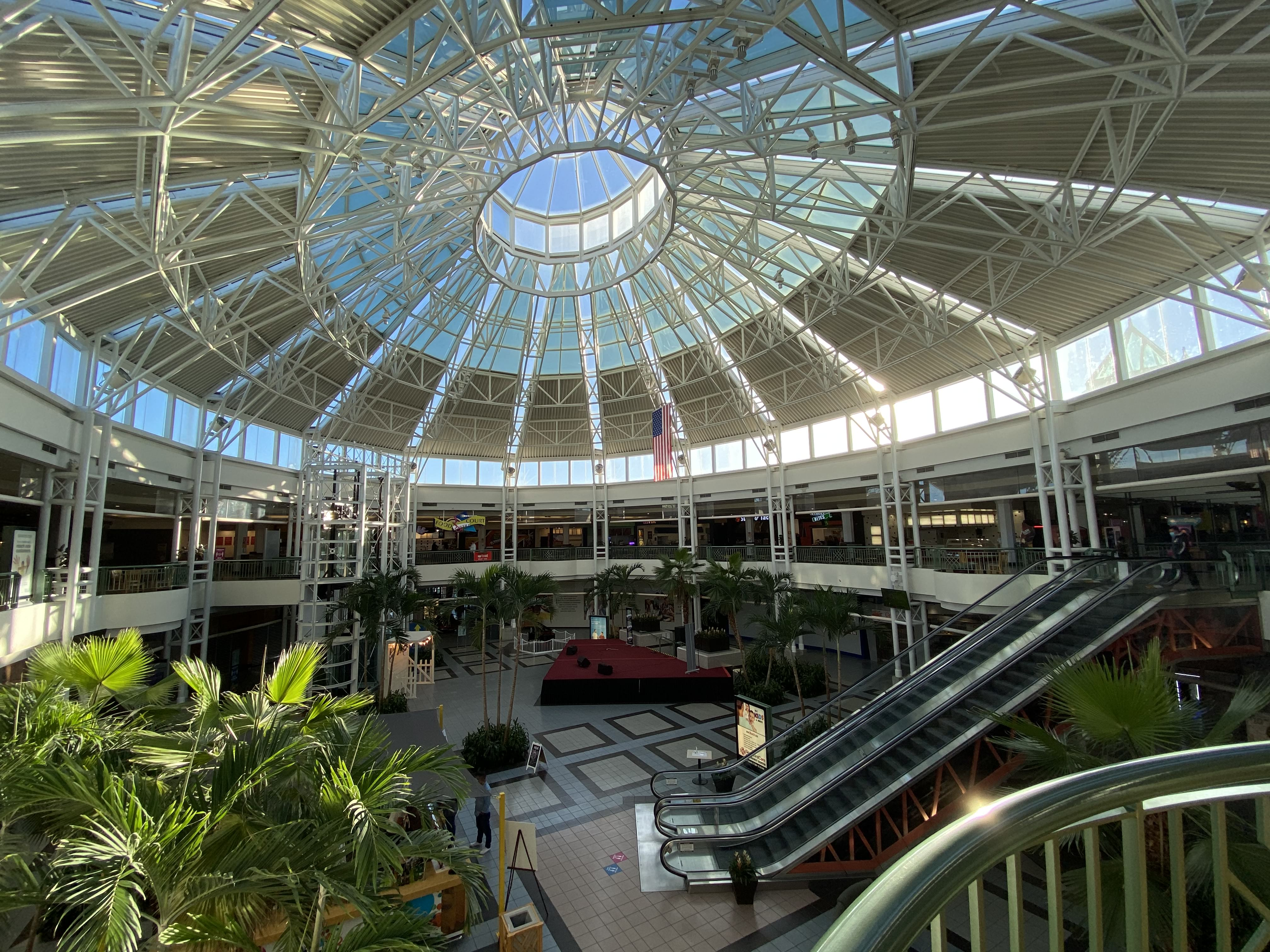
Mall Center Court

The mall competes with nearby Grapevine Mills, which opened in October 1997. The August 2000 opening of Stonebriar Centre in nearby Frisco affected the sales of Lewisville's Vista Ridge Mall and Plano's Collin Creek Mall as both malls experienced what Larry Howard, vice president for development of General Growth Properties Inc., called "some cannibalization".

On September 22, 2006, Cinemark opened an attached 15-screen movie theater, which contains entrances both inside and outside the mall, replacing the 12-screen location which opened in 1989. The original theater has since remained unused.

Foley's was rebranded as Macy's in September 2006, as part of Federated Department Stores acquisition and rebranding of May Department Stores.

==== Early 2010s ====
In January 2013, a man killed himself inside the mall following a domestic dispute. No other injuries or deaths occurred during the incident.

On December 9, 2013, Vista Ridge Mall was featured in an episode of the TLC series, Bakery Boss. On March 23, 2014, the mall was featured in an episode of the Food Network series, Food Court Wars. Pop singer Tiffany performed a concert at the mall during production of the episode.

For several years in the 2010s, Vista Ridge Mall hosted a "Say Goodbye to Summer" party for local students.

=== Music City Mall, Lewisville (2017–2022) ===
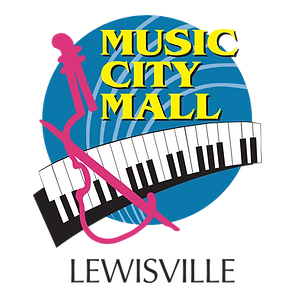
Mall Logo (2017–2022)

In October 2017, the mall was sold for $17.3 million in an online auction to Texas businessman John Bushman of ICA Properties, which owns Music City Mall, Odessa. Notably, the mall sold for less than its appraised value of $34.5 million. Upon the purchase, Vista Ridge Mall was renamed Music City Mall, Lewisville. ICA Properties later unveiled a monument inside the mall featuring the Ten Commandments, which they have a tradition of doing at all of their properties.

On September 18, 2018, the mall hosted a grand re-opening celebration, featuring Disney Channel stars Olivia Rodrigo and Kevin Quinn. The event also included activities for families.

Following the purchase, the mall transitioned to a music-focused identity, and it became a key supporter of the local music and arts scene. Under this ownership, the mall featured multiple live performances seven days a week, which helped sustain local musicians. Music City Mall continued live performances during the COVID-19 pandemic, while adhering to CDC guidelines. The mall began hosting several events throughout the year, such as Malloween, the annual Christmas Tree Lighting ceremony, Dallas Comic Show, and ToyCon. In 2019, the mall hosted the K-Pop Together music festival. The mall still hosts some events, the most notable of which being Dallas Comic Show, which features celebrity appearances.

On May 31, 2018, Sears announced it would be closing as part of a plan to close 72 stores nationwide. The store closed in September 2018. In August 2019, Zion Market opened its first Texas location in the former Sears.

Dillard's transitioned into a clearance location in May 2019. The store is only accessible from exterior entrances, as it keeps the mall gate closed during business hours.

On June 4, 2020, JCPenney announced it would be closing as part of a plan to close 154 stores nationwide. The store completed its liquidation on October 18, 2020.

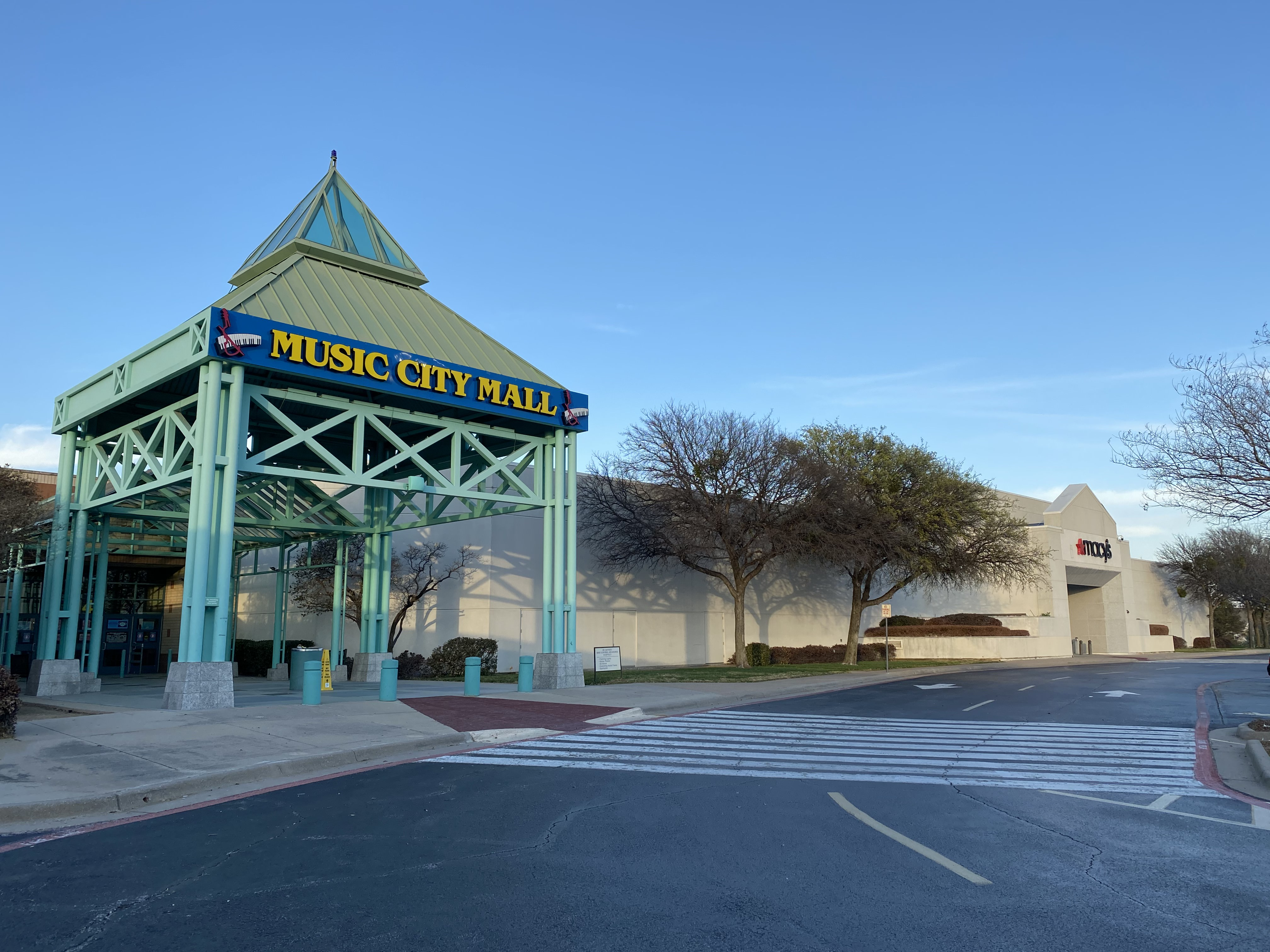
Mall Entrance and Macy's in 2021

On January 6, 2021, Macy's announced it would be closing its location in Music City Mall as part of a plan to close 46 stores nationwide. Macy's completed its liquidation on March 21, 2021, leaving Dillard's Clearance as the only traditional department store left.

The Freeform series, Cruel Summer, used the mall as a filming location. The series ran from April 20, 2021, to July 31, 2023.

=== The Vista (2022–present) ===
On March 21, 2022, the Lewisville City Council approved an agreement with Catalyst Urban Development to prepare for the first phases of a Music City Mall redevelopment project. The mall was then purchased by 1000 South Vermont LLC in September 2022.

Upon the sale of the mall, the live performances were discontinued, and the Ten Commandments monument was removed. The following month, signage featuring the Music City Mall name and logo was removed from the building, revealing the original Vista Ridge Mall signage which sat underneath. Tenants and employees of the mall were informed that the mall would once again be renamed, this time to "The Vista". In November 2022, mall directories were updated to reflect the new name, although exterior signage still refers to the mall as "Vista Ridge Mall".

== Tenants ==
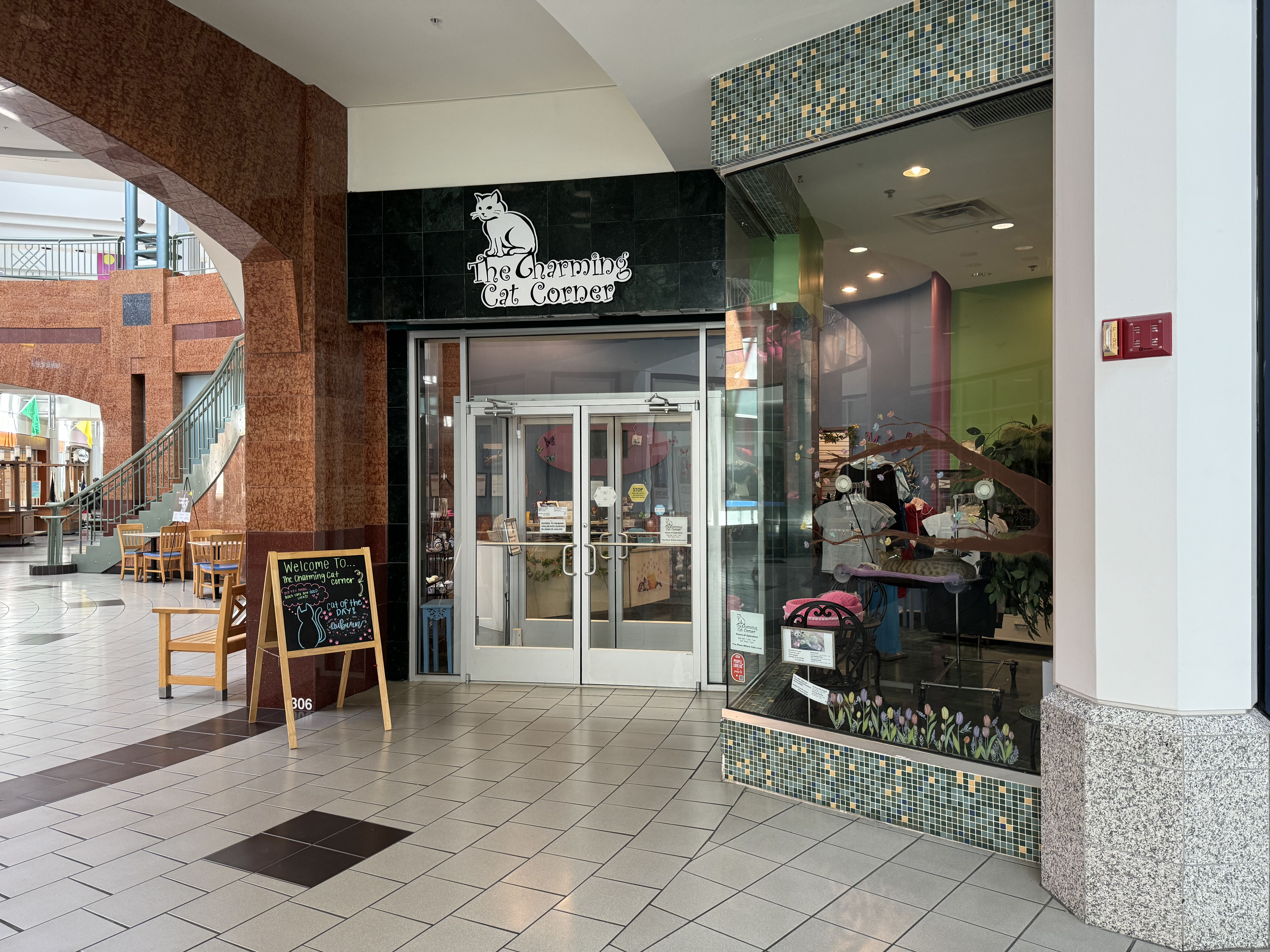
The Charming Cat Corner

The Vista is home to several notable tenants. The Charming Cat Corner, a public foster home for cats, opened at the mall in 2015. Visitors can spend time with the cats, who are all available for adoption. The business was inspired by Cat cafés where visitors spend time with cats while enjoying food and beverages. The Charming Cat Corner does not offer food or beverages due to its proximity to the mall food court.

In 2017, Lest We Forget WWII Museum relocated to the mall from Valley View Center in Dallas. The museum houses World War II artifacts, uniforms, and flags.

Pros & Heroes, a sports memorabilia store, often hosts professional athletes and coaches for signing events at the mall.

Scout's Legacy Service Dogs, a North Texas-based service dog training organization, occasionally uses the mall as a training location.

== Redevelopment ==
In March 2023, during the annual Lewisville City Council Retreat, plans were discussed to redevelop the mall into a mixed-use space which will tentatively contain housing, businesses, shops, restaurants, and entertainment. Concept art presented during the retreat shows that much of the mall will be demolished, however, Dillards, Zion Market, and Cinemark will remain. The glass atrium where the food court currently stands will also remain, as a tribute to the mall which was a Lewisville staple for decades.

In March 2024, during the annual Lewisville City Council Retreat, Lewisville Mayor TJ Gilmore mentioned that mall redevelopment plans had been discussed as early as 2013 or 2014. It was also mentioned that the mall owners hired their own architects and engineers to make adjustments to the redevelopment plans discussed the year prior.

On February 9, 2024, a bond election was called by the Lewisville City Council asking voters to consider various projects around the city. One of the proposals included funding for street infrastructure at the current mall site. The election was held on May 4, 2024, with the proposal being approved by 77% of voters. The project will include right-of-way, utilities, drainage, grading and erosion control, along with other engineering expenses. The total cost for the project is $32,228,582.

Redevelopment plans have not yet been finalized as the city of Lewisville is working to find a developer for the project.

On November 1, 2024, Quicklotz relocated to the mall from North East Mall in Hurst, partially utilizing the space formerly occupied by JCPenney.

In 2025, Quicklotz closed their Vista Mall location and was replaced by an NTX Arena.
