= Auntie Anne's =

U.S. restaurant chain

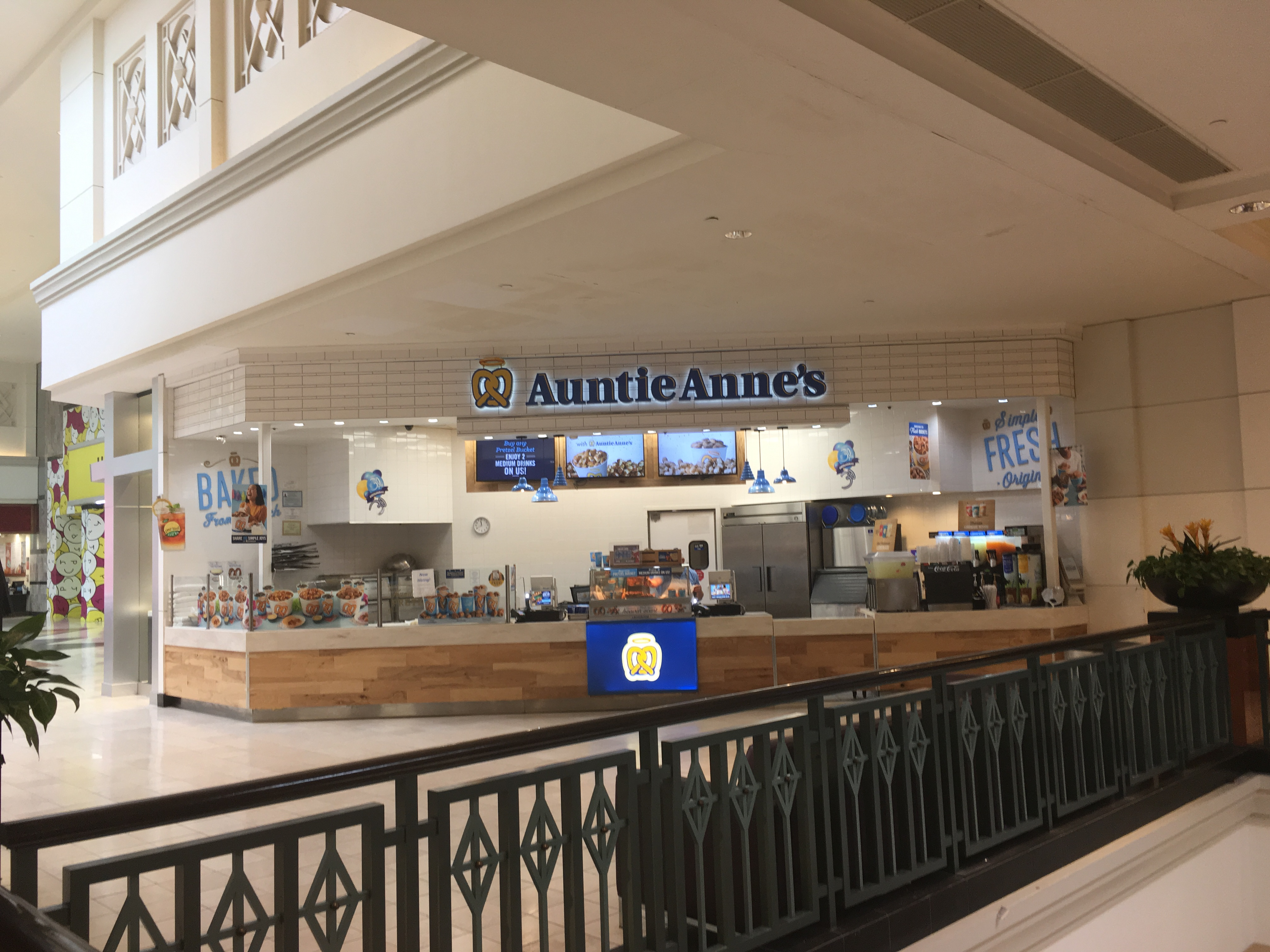
- Auntie Anne's at King of Prussia Mall in King of Prussia, Pennsylvania
- Type: Subsidiary
- Industry: Food and beverage Franchising
- Founded: 1988; 38 years ago, in Downingtown, Pennsylvania, U.S.
- Founder: Anne F. Beiler
- Headquarters: Atlanta, Georgia
- Number of locations: 1,200 (as of August 21, 2023)
- Area served: United States (incl. Guam and Puerto Rico), Canada, Cambodia, China, Costa Rica, Curaçao, Egypt, India, Indonesia, Jordan, Malaysia, New Zealand, Panama, Philippines, Saudi Arabia, Singapore, Taiwan, Thailand, Trinidad and Tobago, United Arab Emirates, United Kingdom, Australia.
- Key people: Julie Younglove-Webb (Chief Brand Officer)
- Products: Pretzels, beverages, dip sauce
- Revenue: ▲US$500 million (2020)
- Parent: GoTo Foods
- Website: www.auntieannes.com

Auntie Anne's is an American franchised chain of pretzel shops founded by Anne F. Beiler and her husband, Jonas, in 1988. Auntie Anne's serves products such as pretzels, dips, and beverages. They also offer Pretzels & More Homemade Baking Mix for those who want to make their pretzels at home. The chain has more than 1,200 stores around various locations, such as in shopping malls and outlet malls, as well as non-traditional retail spaces including universities, parking/rest areas, airports, train stations, travel plazas, amusement parks, and military bases. Their slogan as of 2025 is "Get Twisted".

== History ==
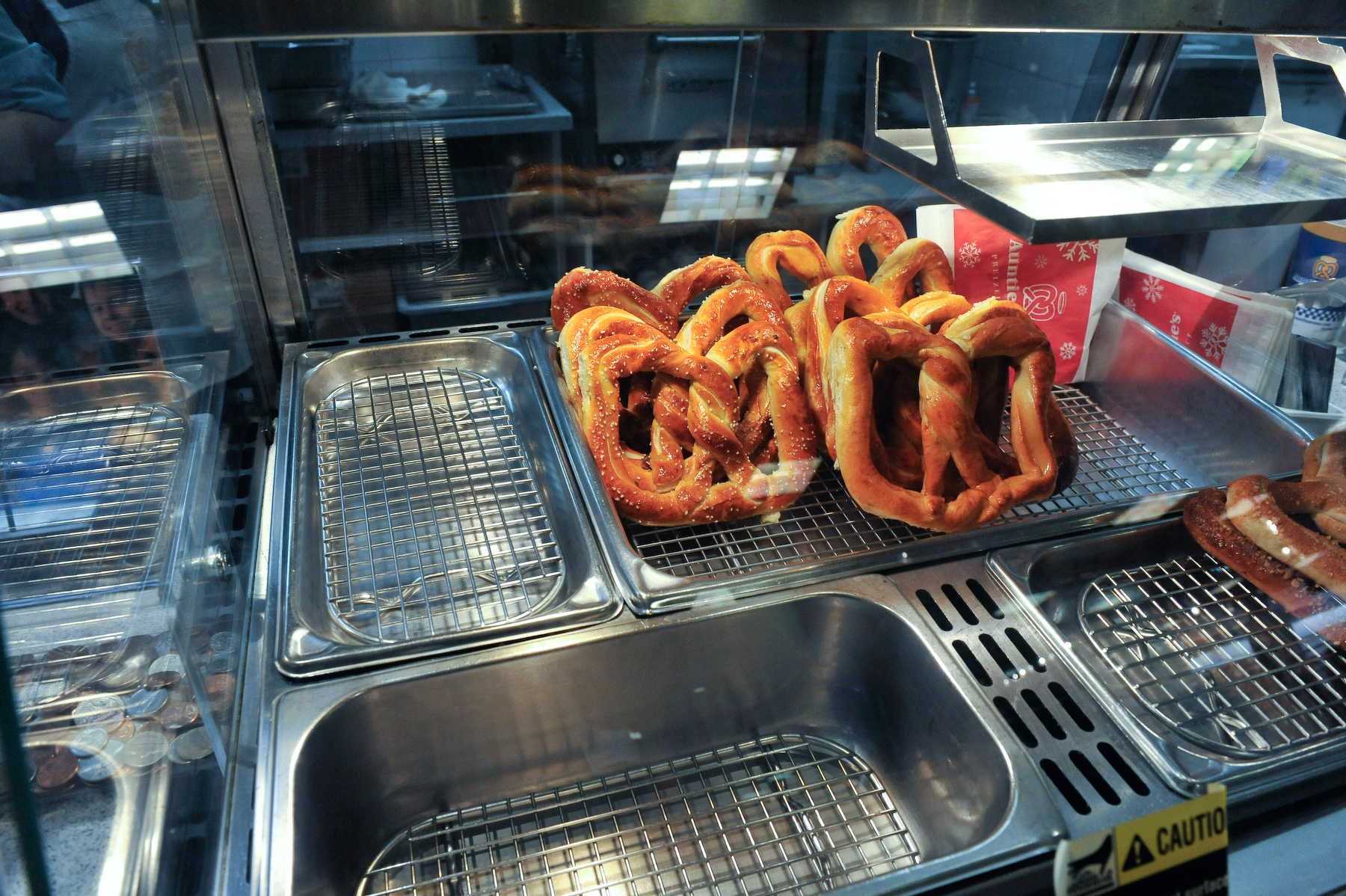
A small assortment of pretzels at an Auntie Anne's location in New York City

The chain started as a market stand in the Downingtown, Pennsylvania, Farmer's Market in 1988. A second location opened in Harrisburg, Pennsylvania, at the Broad Street Market in 1988 before franchising. The franchise began when a store location opened at Saturday's Market in Middletown, Pennsylvania. Auntie Anne's celebrated their 100th store opening in Granite Run Mall in Media, Pennsylvania, in 1992. In 1995, the first train station location opened at Penn Station in New York City. This year also brought the opening of the first international Auntie Anne's store in Jakarta, Indonesia.

In October 2006, it was announced that the Auntie Anne's corporate headquarters would be relocated from the town of Gap, Pennsylvania, to downtown Lancaster. The former site of the Lancaster Post Office was purchased and given minor renovations for about $7 million by Auntie Anne's, Inc. Constructed in 1927, the three-story building stands on about 1.5 acres (6,100 m^{2}). The building maintains the original 1920s features such as brass doors, high ceilings, and skylights. The Lancaster Post Office was listed on the National Register of Historic Places in 1982.

In November 2010, Atlanta franchisor Focus Brands (now known as GoTo Foods), a portfolio company of private equity firm Roark Capital, acquired Auntie Anne's. William P. Dunn Jr. was the company's president and its chief operating officer from 2013 to 2015. Heather Leed Neary became the company's president in 2015.

== International locations ==
Auntie Anne's now has over 600 international locations, including many across Europe, namely the United Kingdom. Locations in Asia include Brunei, Cambodia, Hong Kong, India, Indonesia, Malaysia, Philippines, Egypt, Saudi Arabia, Jordan, South Korea, Singapore, Taiwan, Thailand and Vietnam, while in the Americas there are sites in Costa Rica, Jamaica and Trinidad and Tobago. There are plans to start stores in China.

In overseas markets, the restaurants have made significant alterations to coexist with local sensibilities, including changing recipes to conform to halal in Malaysia.

On July 26, 2025, Auntie Anne's would open its first location in Australia at Westfield Parramatta Shopping Centre.

== Community service and charitable activity ==
From 1999 through 2009, Auntie Anne's and its franchisees partnered to donate more than $4.5 million to local children's hospitals across the country through the Children's Miracle Network. Auntie Anne's has also supported the pediatric cancer charity Alex's Lemonade Stand Foundation since 2011.

Auntie Anne's began a partnership with Food Donation Connection in 2011, matching stores throughout the country with local hunger relief organizations to donate extra pretzel products.

In 2013, Anne and Auntie Anne's was featured in the reality TV series Food Court Wars. Auntie Anne's founder Anne Beiler appeared in the 2013 season premiere of the television show The Secret Millionaire in which she masqueraded as a volunteer at the Baltimore-based food non-profit organization Moveable Feast. She also made a donation to the charity.

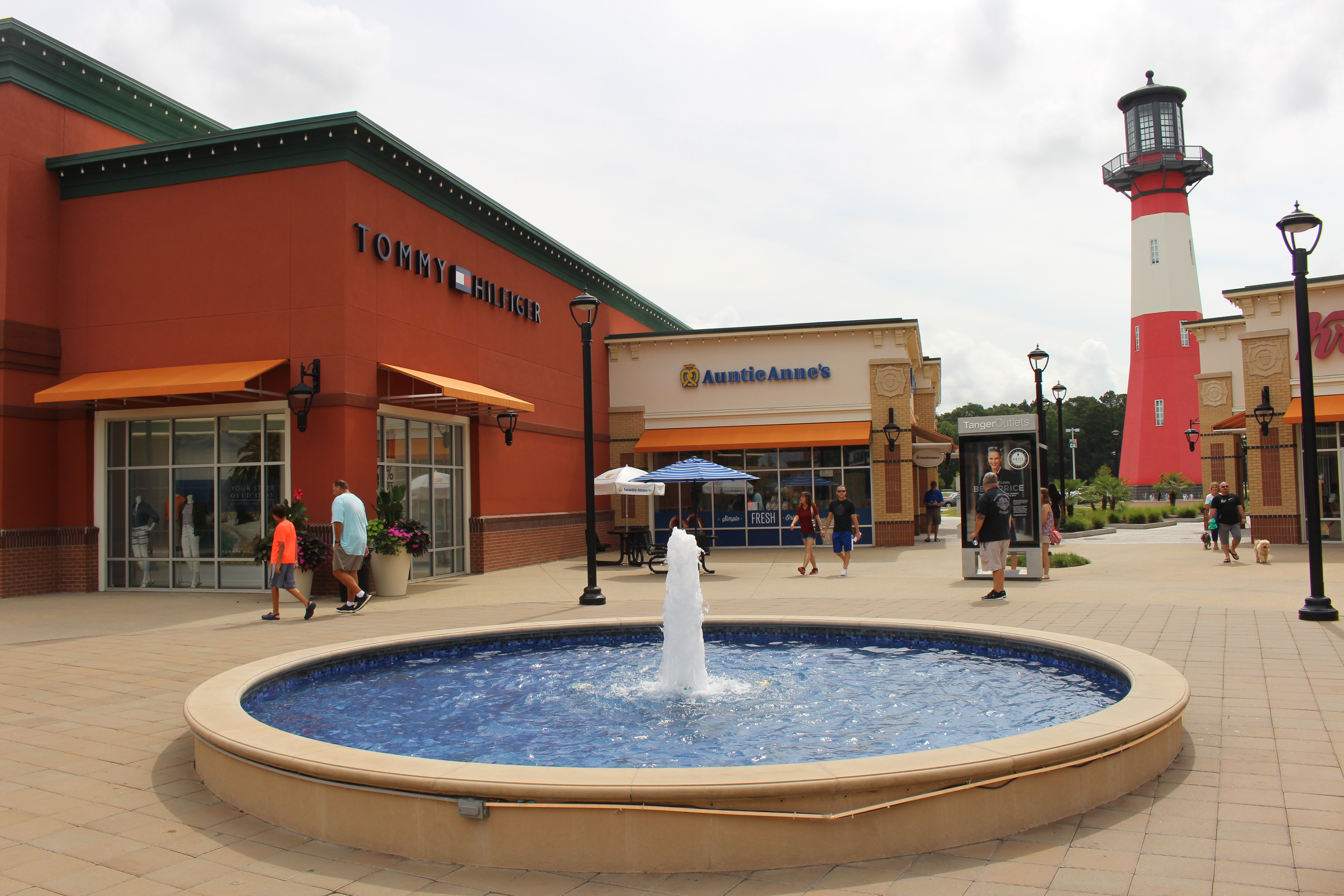
Auntie Anne's at the Tanger Outlets shopping center in Savannah, Georgia

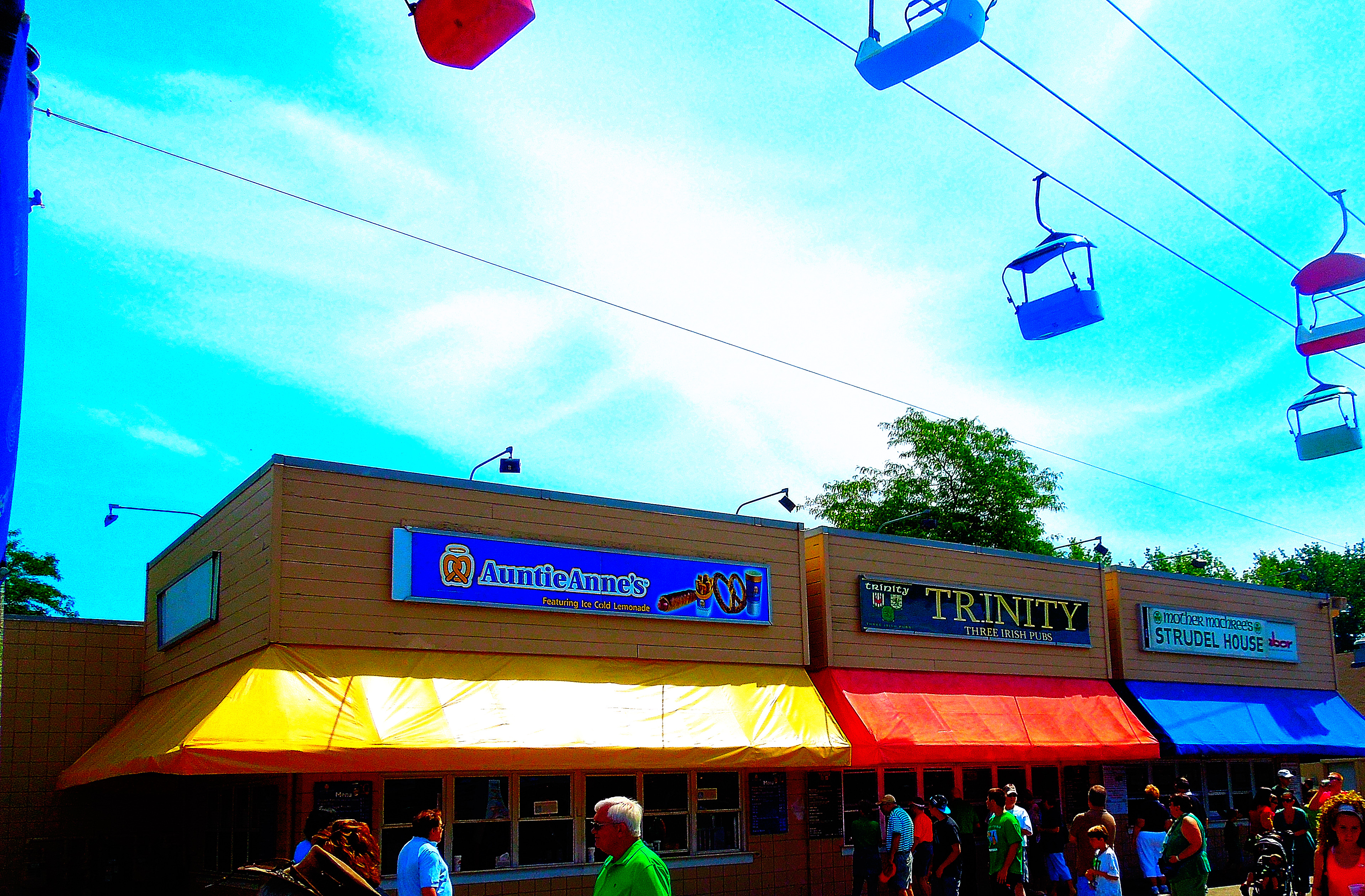
Auntie Anne's at the Milwaukee Irish Fest, Milwaukee, Wisconsin

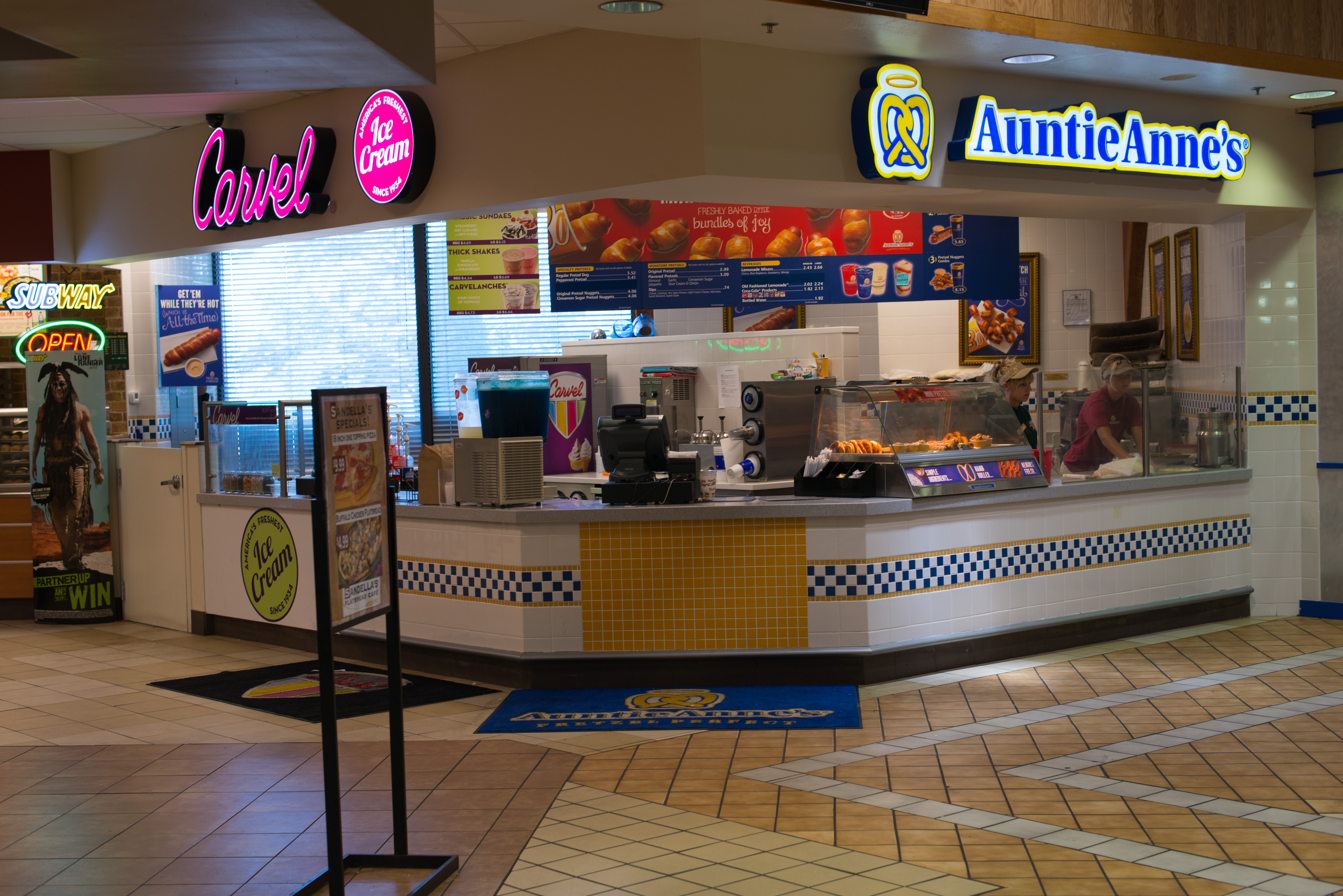
Auntie Anne's at the New York State Thruway Angola Travel Plaza, Angola, New York

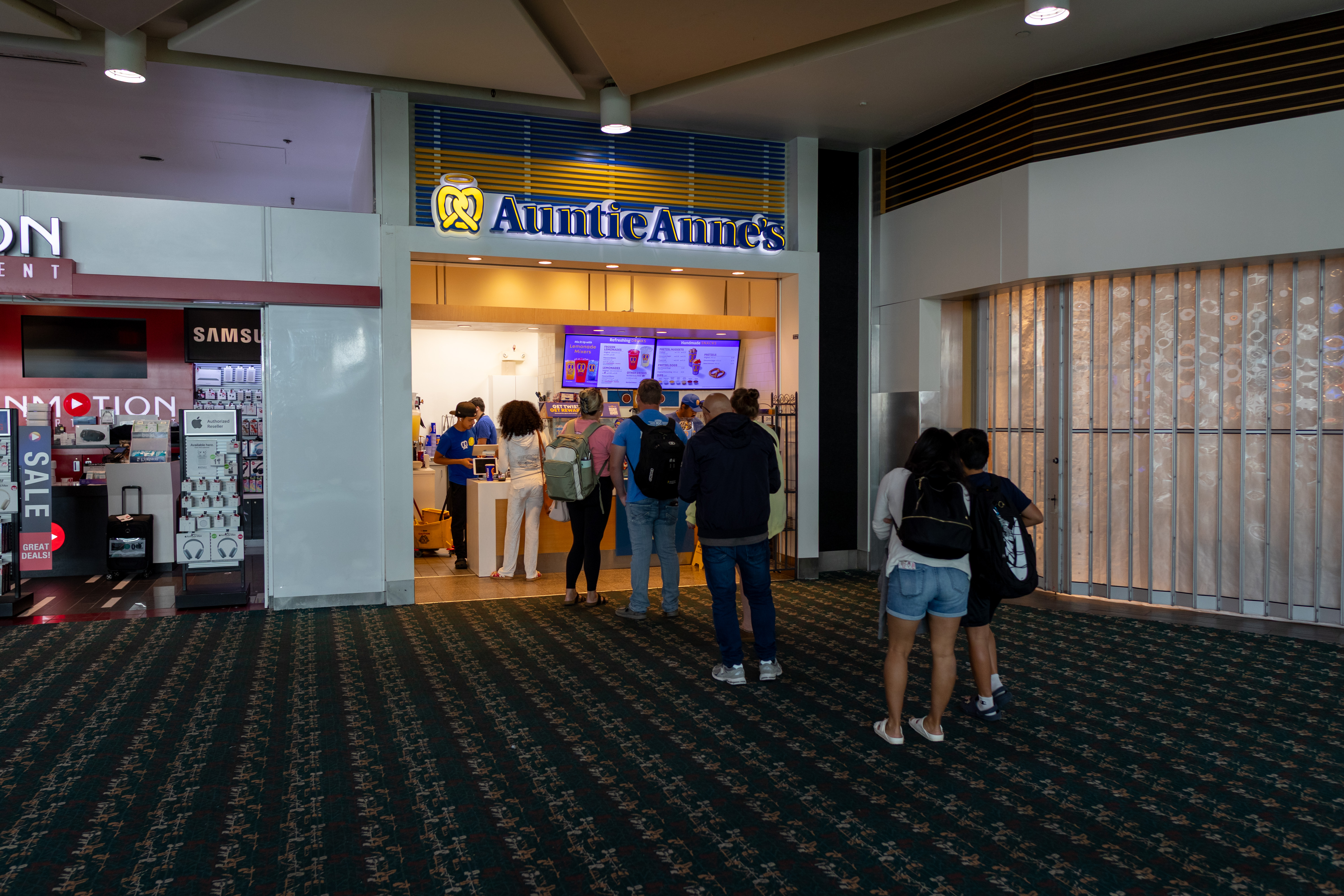
Auntie Anne's at Orlando International Airport in Orlando, Florida

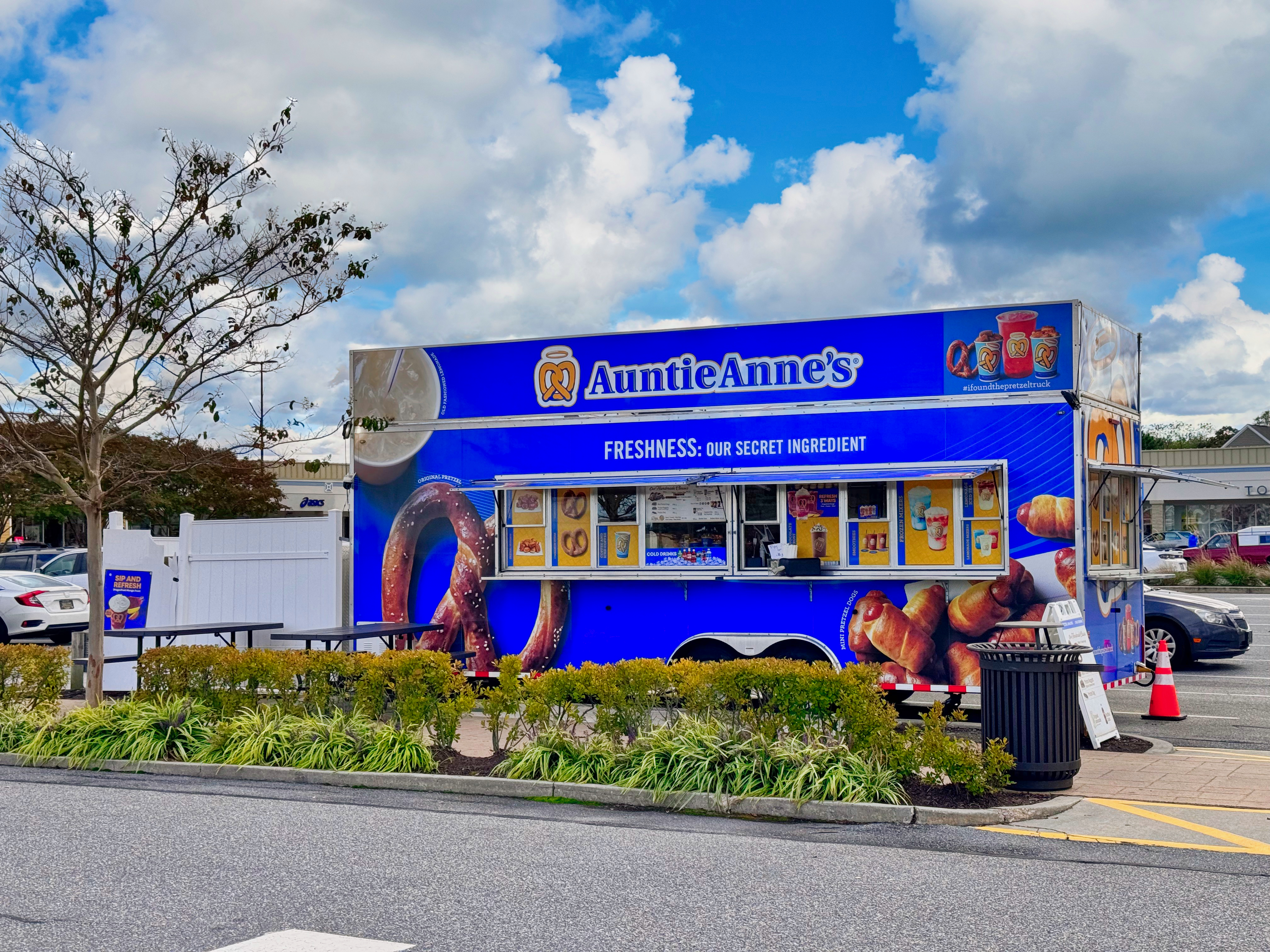
Auntie Anne's food truck in Rehoboth Beach, Delaware

Auntie Anne's at SM Seaside City, Cebu City, Philippines

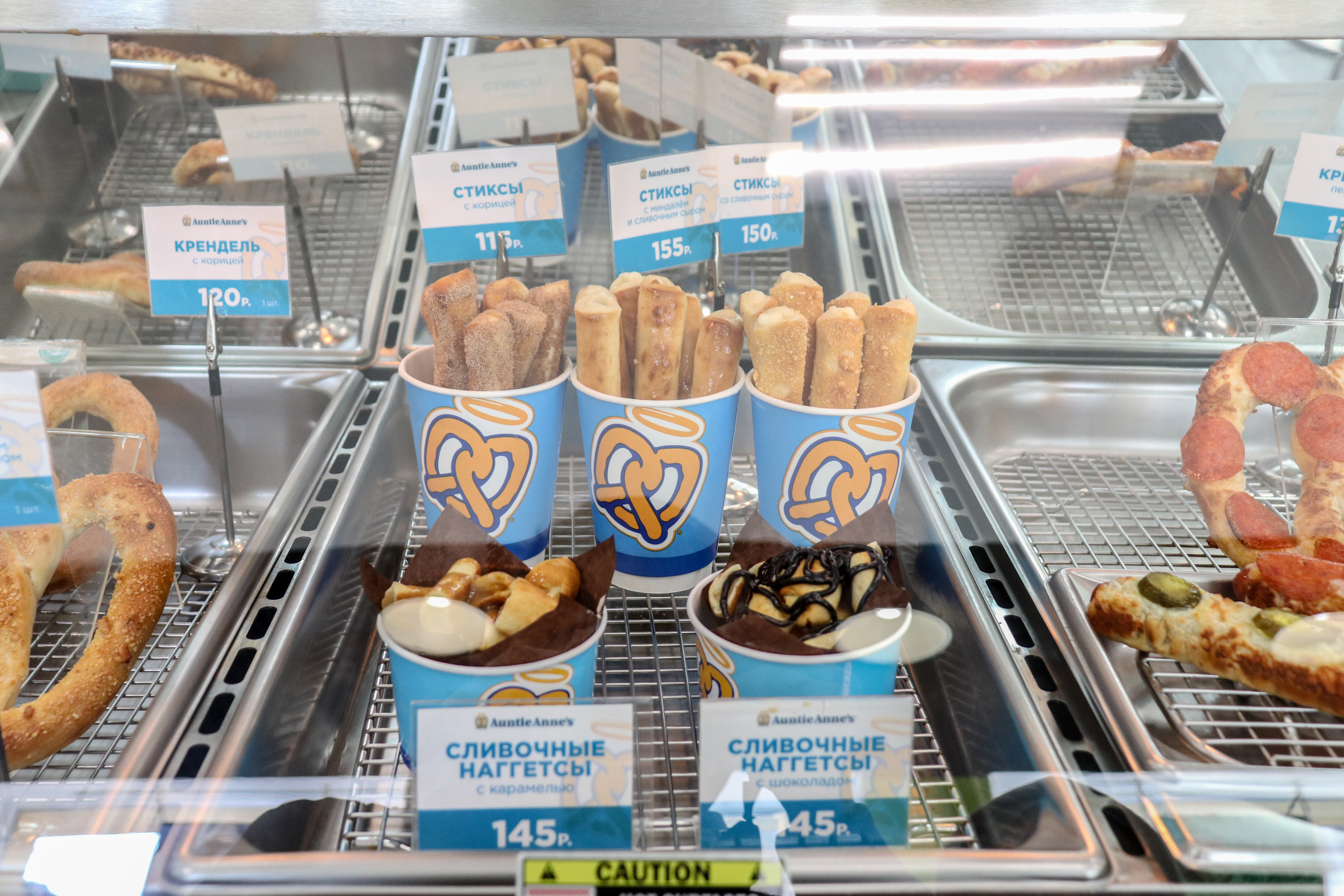
Auntie Anne's pretzels display in Moscow

== In popular culture ==
Anne Beiler's autobiography Twist Of Faith: The Story of Anne Beiler, Founder of Auntie Anne's Pretzels is currently being adapted into a feature film biopic, produced by Called Higher Studios and written by Mark Charran and Beth Goldberg.

== See also ==
- List of food companies
