= Anne F. Beiler =

American businesswoman

- Born: January 16, 1949 (age 77); Lancaster County, Pennsylvania, U.S.
- Known for: Founder of Auntie Anne's Pretzels
- Board member of: Museum of the Bible
- Spouse: Jonas Z. Beiler (m. 1968)
- Children: 3
- Awards: Entrepreneur of the Year (Inc. Magazine)

Anne F. Beiler (born January 16, 1949) is an American businesswoman who founded Auntie Anne's pretzels.

== Early life ==
Anne was born on January 16, 1949 in Lancaster County, Pennsylvania to an Old Order Amish family. She grew up on a 100 acre farm with seven siblings. At age three, her family converted to the Amish Mennonite faith and were allowed limited access to modern amenities like electricity and cars, although there was no television or radio in the home. Anne received no more than an eighth grade education.

== Marriage ==
Anne married Jonas Z. Beiler in 1968 when they were respectively 19 and 21. He was raised Old Order Amish. They had three daughters: LaWonna (born 1971), Angela Joy (1974–1975), and Joy LaVale (born 1976). Angela died at 19 months old, in a farming accident involving a Bobcat tractor driven by one of Beiler's sisters on the family's property in Pennsylvania. Anne was overcome with grief and sought grief counseling from a pastor. She entered counseling in an emotionally vulnerable state, and the pastor started sexually abusing her. This continued for six years and caused great suffering to Anne, who had intense struggles in her marriage with Jonas, which led to him deciding to study for a new career change to marriage and family therapist. By 1982, Beiler had extricated herself from the abusive pastor, who went on to lose his license due to actions with multiple women that came to light. Anne Beiler agreed to become the breadwinner, allowing Jonas to continue his counseling pursuit, because he had "stayed with me despite all that I’ve done."

== Career ==
To support Jonas's endeavor, Beiler bought an Amish store in Downingtown, Pennsylvania for $6000 with a loan coming from Jonas's parent. Opened on February 2, 1988, the store found initial success by originally selling pretzels and pizzas. Over the next 6 weeks, Beiler tweaked the previous owner's menu and recipes, removing the pizza to focus on the popular pretzels. After several weeks, the store was given the name of "Auntie Anne's Soft Pretzels" based on what her nieces and nephew called her. By July 4th, Beiler opened another store in Harrisburg and hit sales of $100,000, which she said was "more money than I’d ever seen in my whole life." Beiler would go on to allow friends and family to build 10 stores under a licensing agreement in 1989. In 1989, the first Auntie Anne's franchises opened throughout Central Pennsylvania.

== Written works ==
In 2002, Beiler wrote a story book style autobiography entitled Auntie Anne: My Story in collaboration with illustrator Frieman Stoltzfus. In 2008, Beiler wrote a memoir with her nephew, Shawn Smucker, entitled Twist of Faith: The Story of Anne Beiler, Founder of Auntie Anne's Pretzels, which was published by Thomas Nelson Inc. Her third book, co-authored with Emily Sutherland, entitled, The Secret Lies Within: An Inside Out Look at Overcoming Trauma and Finding Purpose in the Pain was released by Morgan James Publishing in 2018. In 2021, she released Overcome & Lead, which she also co-authored with Emily Sutherland, detailing the leadership lessons learned while building the international Auntie Anne's Pretzel franchise.

== Personal life ==
By LaWonna, she has three grandchildren, and through her seven siblings, she has more than thirty nieces and nephews. Dyslexia affects several members of her family.

Beiler describes in her memoir that her church's pastor had maintained secret sexual relationships with her and her sisters, and that he had also molested her daughter LaWonna.

Beiler holds two honorary doctorates, one from Elizabethtown College and another from the Eastern University. She obtained her GED at the age of 50. She served on the board of directors for the Museum of the Bible, which opened in 2017 with support from Hobby Lobby's founder, David Green.

Beiler delivered a speech at the 2008 Republican National Convention on September 3, 2008.
