= United States Post Office (Lancaster, Pennsylvania) =

- United States Post Office, Lancaster, Pennsylvania
- U.S. National Register of Historic Places
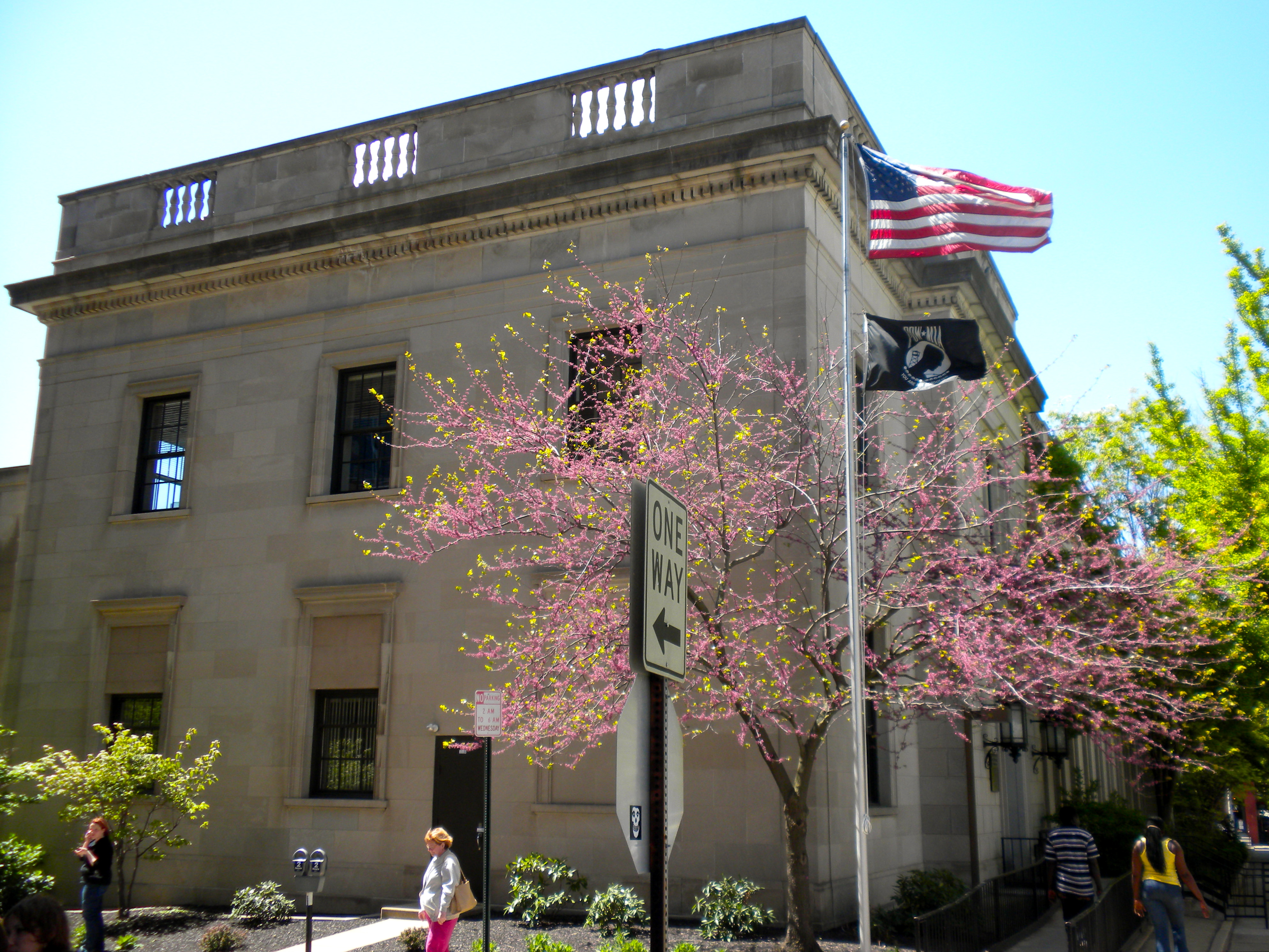
- Old Post Office, April 2010

- Location within Pennsylvania Location within the United States
- Location: 50 W. Chestnut St., Lancaster, Pennsylvania
- Coordinates: 40°2′26″N 76°18′28″W
- Area: 1.5 acres (0.61 ha)
- Built: 1928–1930
- Architect: Office of the Supervising Architect under James A. Wetmore, Algernon Blair
- Architectural style: Moderne, Beaux Arts Classicism
- NRHP reference No.: 81000545
- Added to NRHP: July 23, 1981

The United States Post Office is an historic post office building in Lancaster, Lancaster County, Pennsylvania, United States.

It was listed on the National Register of Historic Places in 1981.

== History and architectural features ==
Built between 1928 and 1930, this historic structure was designed by the Office of the Supervising Architect under Acting Supervising Architect James A. Wetmore. It is a two-story, fifteen-bay-wide building with a high basement and attic and a slate-covered mansard roof. It is faced in Indiana limestone and features a balustrade and parapet at the roofline. It has a one-story rear wing. The front elevation has eleven bays separated by two-story, Tuscan order pilasters. It is an example of Beaux-Arts-style architecture with Moderne influences. The site was previously the location of the Lancasterian School and a Moravian graveyard. The building is now a corporate headquarters for Auntie Anne's.
