= Zion Market =

Korean-American supermarket chain

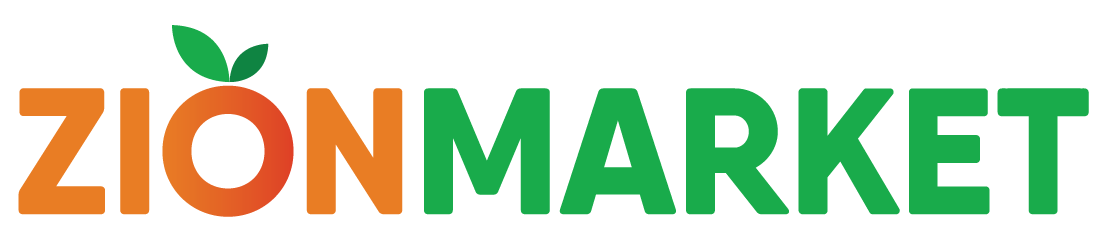

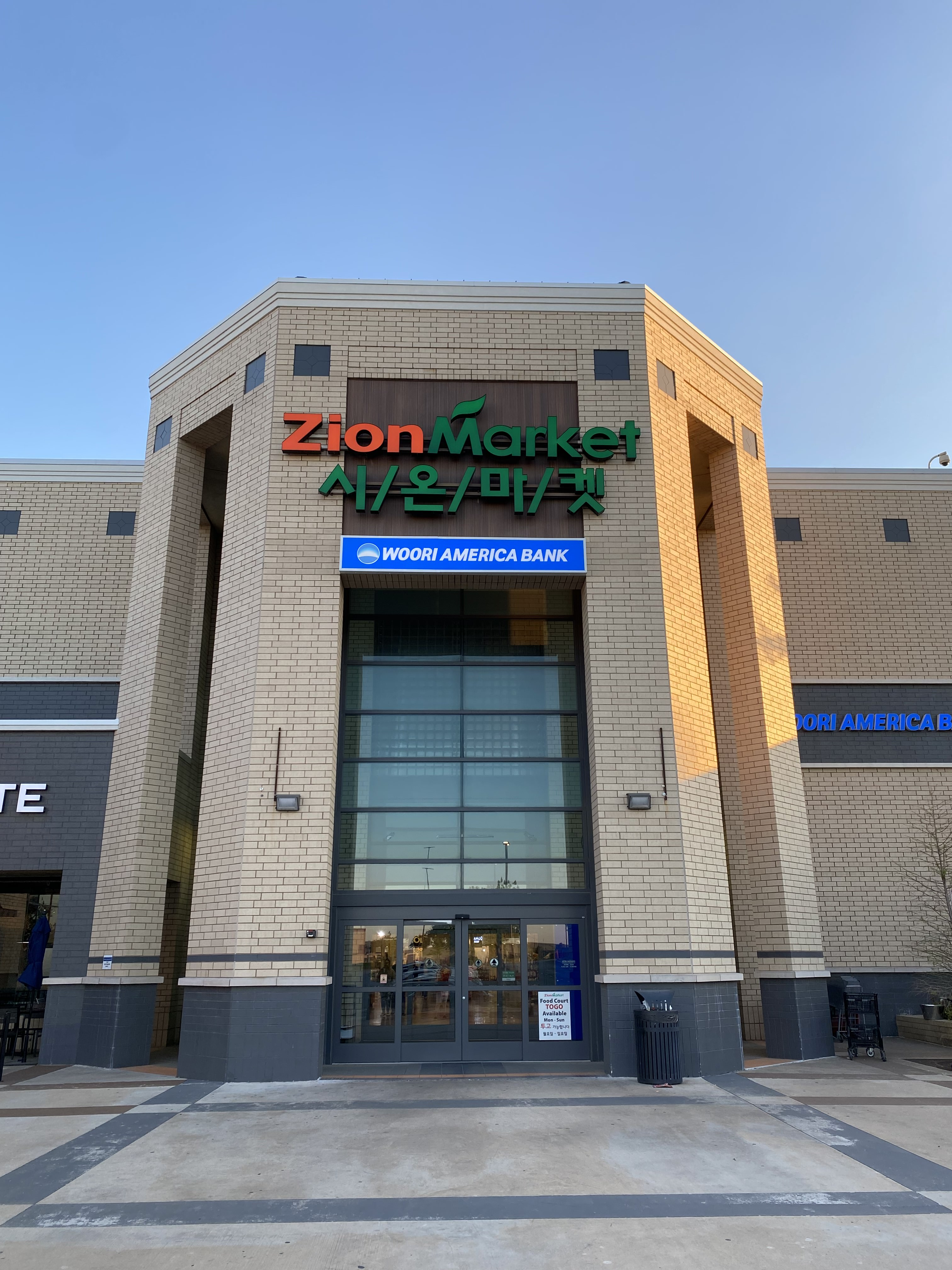
- A Zion Market at The Vista, Lewisville, Texas
- Native name: 시온마켓
- Type: Private
- Industry: Grocery store Retail
- Founded: 1979; Kearny Mesa, San Diego
- Headquarters: San Diego, California
- Number of locations: 6 (2025)
- Area served: California; Georgia; Texas
- Key people: Kyu-man Hwang (chairman); Moses Hwang (president)
- Website: zionmarket.com

Zion Market (Korean: 시온마켓) is an American chain of Asian supermarkets specializing in Korean groceries, headquartered in San Diego, California. In 2013, it was described as one of the most influential Korean supermarkets in Southern California.

Zion Market was founded in 1979 on Convoy Street in Kearny Mesa, San Diego. It was the city's first Korean grocery store and one of the earliest Asian businesses in what became the Convoy District. Since 1981, the chain has been owned by the Hwang family, in-laws of the founders, and operates six stores in California, Georgia, and Texas.

Zion Market stores carry Korean and other Asian groceries, including produce, meat, seafood, and prepared foods. Many locations include a food court and tenant shops.

== History ==
Zion Market was opened in 1979 as a 3,000-square-foot (280 m^{2}) store on Convoy Street, serving San Diego's growing Korean community, at the time the first Korean grocery in the city.

By 2002, the store moved to 4611 Mercury Street, adopting a marketplace format with restaurants and tenant shops. In 2013, it moved into a nearly 100,000-square-foot (9,300 m^{2}) former department store at 7655 Clairemont Mesa Boulevard, housing the supermarket alongside a food court and space for 39 tenants.

=== Expansion ===
The company operated as a single store since 1979 before opening a second location in Hawaiian Gardens in 2006, followed by Irvine in 2007, and Koreatown, Los Angeles in 2009. In 2013, Moses Hwang, son of chairman Kyu-man Hwang, was named president. The same year, the company acquired the former Woori Market in Cerritos and purchased a distribution warehouse in Los Angeles. Stores followed in Buena Park (2013) and Duluth, Georgia (2017).

In February 2019, Immigration and Customs Enforcement (ICE) raided the San Diego store and detained 26 workers found to be in the United States without authorization. Most of the workers were released the same day pending immigration proceedings. In December 2020, Zion Market and a manager pleaded guilty to a federal misdemeanor charge of continuing to employ unauthorized workers, a practice the plea agreement dated to 2003. The company was fined $500,000 and the manager $5,000.

An additional store opened in Lewisville, Texas in August 2019. A K-pop festival featuring Weki Meki followed in October. The Koreatown store relocated to Vermont Avenue in 2020, and again in 2024 to Oxford Avenue.

In January 2025, the San Diego store relocated to a smaller, approximately 44,000-square-foot (4,100 m^{2}) building at 8330 Clairemont Mesa Boulevard, on a roughly seven-acre site the company had purchased in 2014. After the lease on the previous store ended in 2023, the move was delayed about two years by the COVID-19 pandemic. The store anchors a mixed-use development led by Moses and Kevin Hwang, with ten restaurants and a planned 25,000-square-foot (2,300 m^{2}) rooftop food hall with a cocktail bar.

== Locations ==
- Kearny Mesa, San Diego (opened 1979; relocated 2002, 2013, 2025)
- Irvine, California (opened 2007)
- Koreatown, Los Angeles (opened 2009; relocated 2020, 2024)
- Buena Park, California (opened 2013)
- Duluth, Georgia (opened 2017)
- Lewisville, Texas (opened 2019)

=== Former locations ===
- Hawaiian Gardens, California
- Cerritos, California
