= Wausau Center =

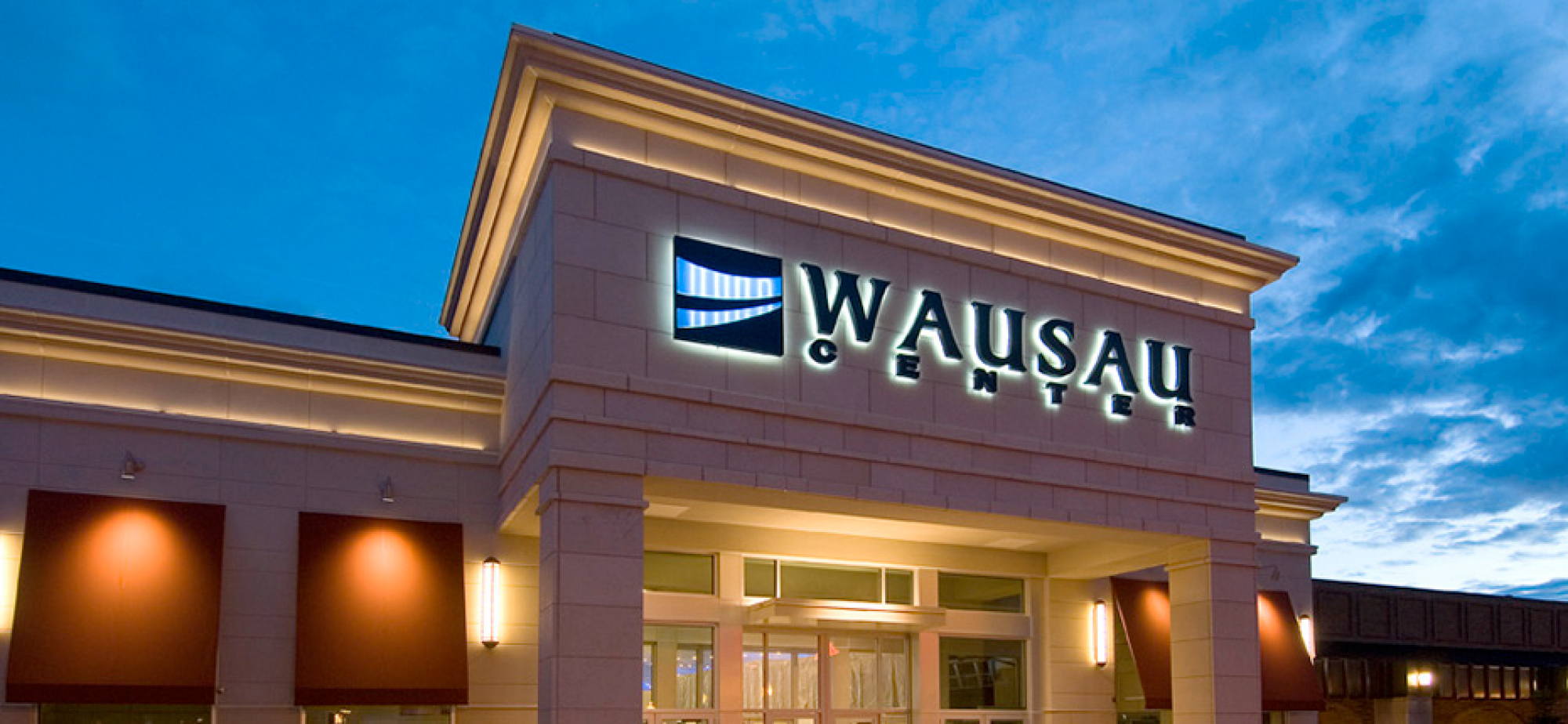
- Wausau Center Main Entrance
- Location: Wausau, Wisconsin
- Coordinates: 44.9585°N 89.6281°W
- Address: C-302 Wausau Center
- Opened: August 3, 1983; 43 years ago
- Closed: April 5, 2021; 5 years ago
- Developer: Jacobs Visconsi Jacobs
- Owner: Wausau Opportunity Zone, Inc.
- Num. of stores: 40+
- Num. of anchor tenants: 3 (at peak)
- Floor area: 423,132 square feet (39,000 m^{2})
- Floors: 1
- Public transit: Metro Ride

Wausau Center was an enclosed shopping mall which opened in 1983 in downtown Wausau, Wisconsin. At its peak, it was anchored by JCPenney, Sears, and Younkers, which later became HOM Furniture. The mall was sold to and redeveloped by Wausau Opportunity Zone, Inc. into the housing development Foundry on 3rd. It was managed by Mid-America Real Estate Group.

== History ==
The downtown area of Wausau was blighted by many vacant buildings in the late 1970s. A referendum passed in 1979 to allow Richard E. Jacobs' Jacobs Visconsi & Jacobs Group to build the mall. Approximately 67 buildings were demolished to make way for the mall, which opened on August 3, 1983. To commemorate the opening, a five-day celebration was held. Its original anchors were J. C. Penney, Sears, and Prange's (later Younkers). Walgreens, an original tenant, moved out in 2003 relocating to central Bridge Street.

In 2006, the mall owners began a renovation that included new seating areas and an improved mall entrance. Two years later, the food court was expanded, using space vacated that same year by a McDonald's.

The mall lost all three anchor stores between 2014 and 2018, with Younkers being the last of the three to close; in June 2019, HOM Furniture opened as the center's sole anchor store, having acquired the previously closed Younkers location.

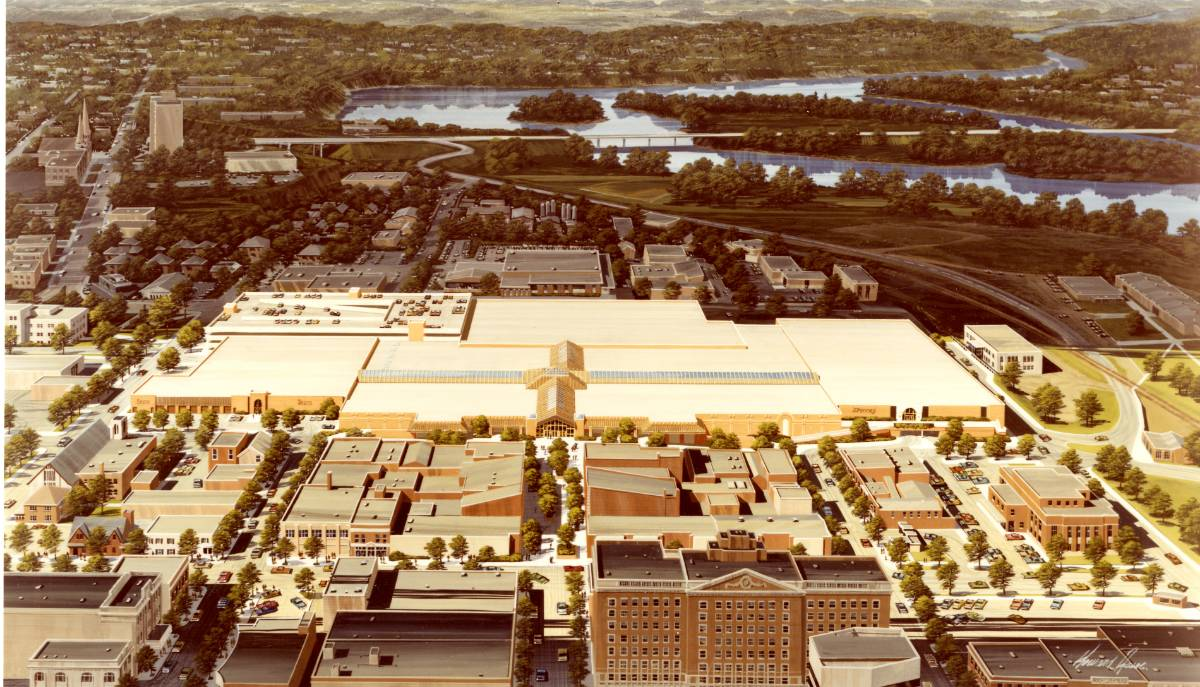
Artists rendition of proposed mall

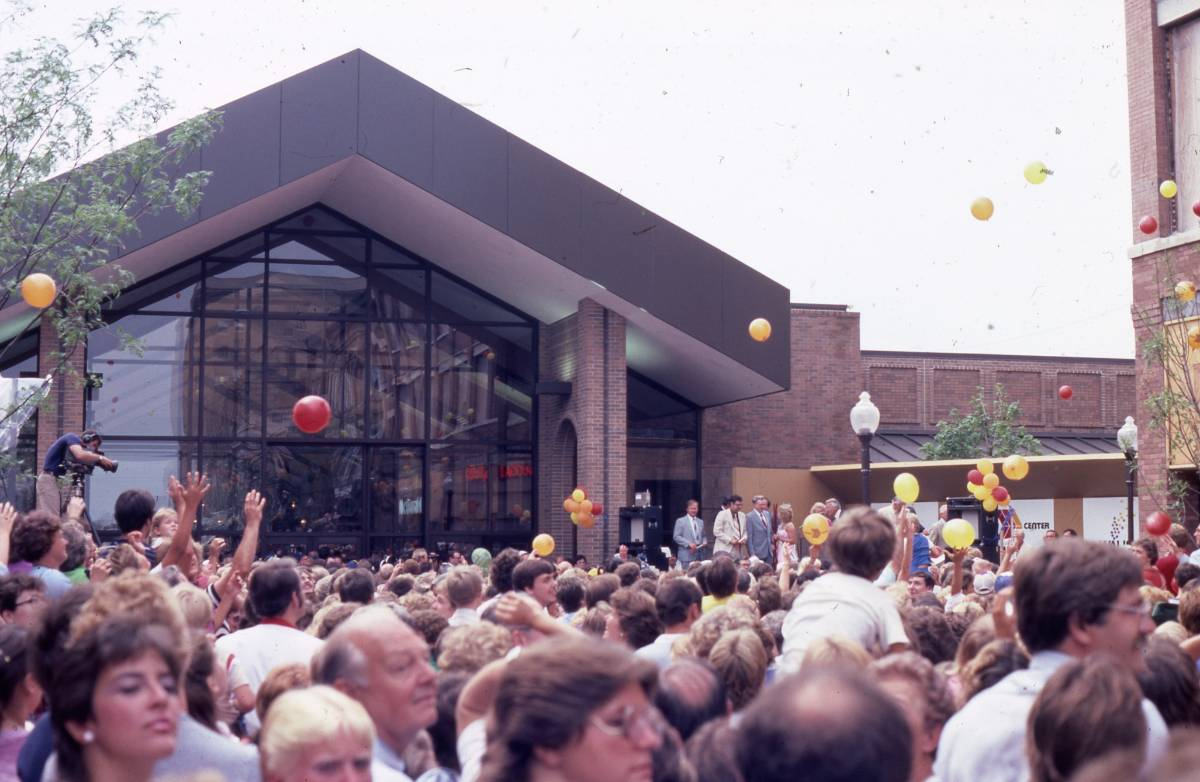
Original Main Entrance

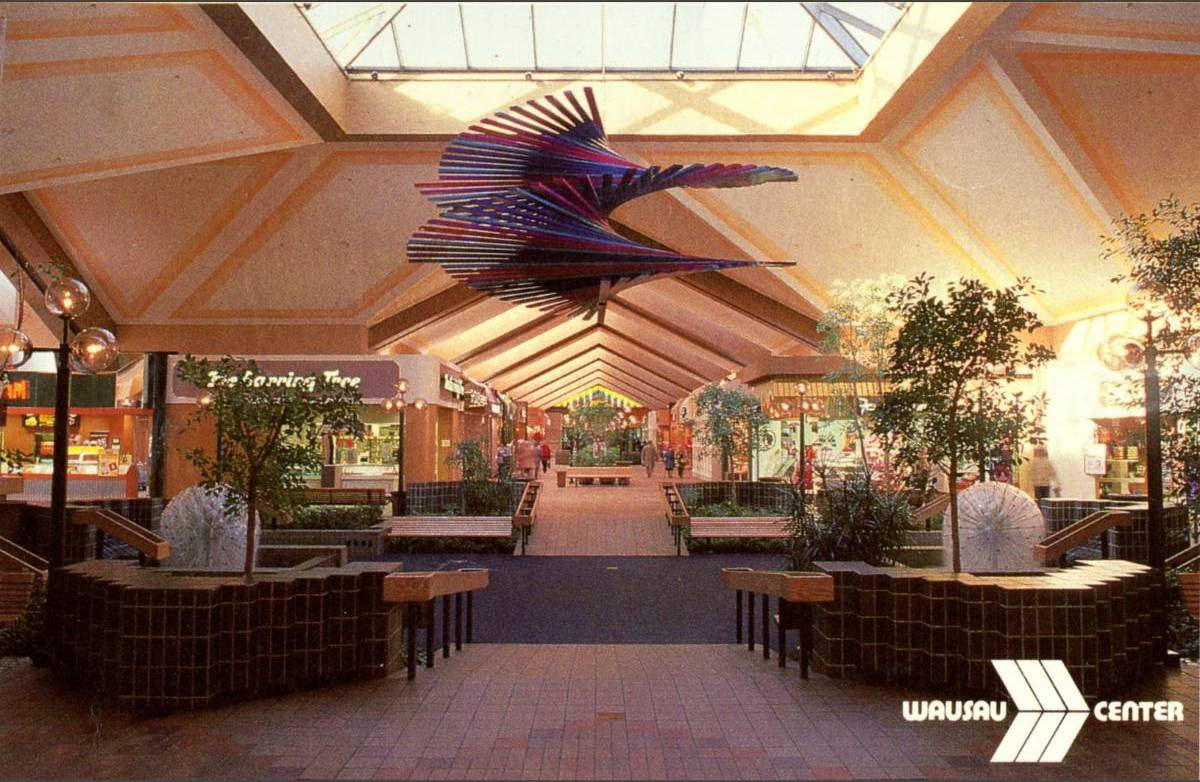
Original Mall Interior

== Foundry on 3rd ==
On February 4, 2020, the mall was sold to Wausau Opportunity Zone, Inc. (WOZ). The acquisition does not include HOM Furniture or the two parking ramps. It was planned for demolition sometime in 2021 to make way for a multimillion-dollar housing redevelopment named Foundry on 3rd, which included residential and retail areas, office space, restaurants, entertainment, and green spaces. The mall closed permanently in April 2021. Demolition began on May 17, 2021. It took up to eight weeks for construction crews to remove the buildings and foundations, with HOM Furniture, the two parking ramps, and the JCPenney building remaining. The JCPenney building will temporarily remain in place due to its location above the west parking ramp but is planned to be removed later. Construction on the complex began in 2024 and was mostly completed in 2026.
