= Colony Square Mall =

Shopping mall in Zanesville, Ohio

- Location: Zanesville, Ohio, United States
- Coordinates: 39°59′16″N 82°01′38″W
- Address: 3575 Maple Avenue
- Opened: March 18, 1981
- Developer: General Growth Corporation
- Manager: Urban Retail Properties, LLC
- Owner: Time Equities, Inc.
- Num. of stores: 70
- Num. of anchor tenants: 8 (7 open, 1 vacant)
- Floor area: 610,000 sq ft (57,000 m^{2})
- Floors: 1 (2 in Cinemark)
- Website: colonysquaremall.com

Colony Square Mall is an enclosed shopping mall in Zanesville, Ohio. Opened in 1981, the anchor stores are Cinemark Theatres, Dunham's Sports, Planet Fitness, TJ Maxx, Five Below, and JCPenney. There are 2 vacant anchor stores that were once occupied by Elder-Beerman and Jo-Ann Fabrics. The Elder Beerman space is owned by Time Equities, Inc.

== History ==
Colony Square Mall opened on March 18, 1981 with 40 stores. Anchors at the time included JCPenney and Sears. Expansions would later add Elder-Beerman in 1985 and Lazarus in 1987.

On July 20, 1995, Lowe's Home Improvement opened in the mall's surrounding area. Then in 2006, Sam's Club opened to the public nearby.

Lazarus, an original anchor, closed in 2002. Three years later, the former building was torn down for a movie theater. Old Navy closed in 2008. Anchor store Sears closed in 2013 and the space was converted to Dunham's Sports. In January 2017 it was announced the mall had been purchased by Time Equities Inc. of New York City $31.5 million. New leases included TJ Maxx, Shoe Carnival, and Planet Fitness.
