= List of American Academy of Arts and Sciences members (1953–1993) =

The following is a list of members of the American Academy of Arts and Sciences from the years 1953 to 1993.

== 1953 ==
- Barbara Wharton Low
- Rudolph Ruzicka

== 1954 ==
- Albert Schweitzer
- George W. Whitehead

== 1956 ==
- Gerald Holton
- Robert M. Solow

== 1957 ==
- Walter Heinrich Munk
- James Dewey Watson

== 1958 ==
- Louis Wellington Cabot
- John Torrence Tate, Jr.
- Robert Walter Williams

== 1959 ==
- Henry Alfred Kissinger
- Tsung-Dao Lee
- Isadore Manuel Singer
- Edward O. Wilson
- Chen Ning Yang

== 1960 ==
- Arthur Earl Bryson, Jr.
- Elias James Corey
- Jean-Pierre Serre

== 1961 ==
- John Willard Milnor
- Ronald Filmore Probstein

== 1962 ==
- Donald Sommers Blough
- George Whipple Clark
- Stephen Richards Graubard
- Matthew Stanley Meselson
- Guido Munch
- Leontyne Price
- John Wermer

== 1963 ==
- Bernard Bailyn
- Lewis White Beck
- Avram Noam Chomsky
- David Raymond Layzer
- Arthur Edward Lilley
- Arthur Beck Pardee
- David Rutstein
- George Veronis

== 1964 ==
- Benjamin Peter Dailey
- Manfred Eigen
- Dudley Robert Herschbach
- Howard H. Hiatt
- Henry Pratt McKean
- David Bryant Mumford
- Paul S. Russell

== 1965 ==
- Frederick Henry Abernathy
- Frederick Davis Greene II
- Richard Charles Lewontin
- Herbert George Weiss

== 1966 ==
- Lewis McAdory Branscomb
- Sydney Brenner
- Geoffrey Foucar Chew
- Albert Jakob Eschenmoser
- Martin Karplus
- Joseph John Kohn
- Peter David Lax
- William Liller
- Edward Wilson Merrill

== 1967 ==
- Lennart Axel Edvard Carleson
- Anthony Gervin Oettinger
- Ieoh Ming Pei
- Stuart Alan Rice
- Harold Abraham Scheraga
- Jack Leonard Strominger
- Torsten Nils Wiesel

== 1968 ==
- Richard Earl Caves
- Joseph Grafton Gall
- Alan Garen
- Walter Gilbert
- Harvey Philip Greenspan
- Jerome Kagan
- Martin Emil Marty
- Phil Caldwell Neal
- Stephen Smale
- Steven Weinberg
- Kenneth Berle Wiberg

== 1969 ==
- Michael Artin
- Eric Bentley
- Derek Curtis Bok
- Jerome Alan Cohen
- Alfred Walter Crompton
- Richard Lawrence Garwin
- Heisuke Hironaka
- Dale Weldeau Jorgenson
- Henry Rosovsky
- Maarten Schmidt
- Irwin Ira Shapiro
- Jack Steinberger
- Shlomo Zvi Sternberg
- Noboru Sueoka
- Paul Talalay

== 1970 ==
- Bruce Nathan Ames
- Sigurður Helgason
- Donald Lawrence Keene
- Robert Jay Lifton
- Everett Irwin Mendelsohn
- Joseph Hillis Miller
- Eugene Newman Parker
- Roy Radner
- George Pratt Shultz

== 1971 ==
- Donald David Brown
- Ramsey Clark
- Roderick Clayton
- Martin Robert Coles
- Renée Claire Fox
- Antony Hewish
- Roald Hoffmann
- Richard Hadley Holm
- Kenneth Keniston
- Ben Roy Mottelson
- Marc Leon Nerlove
- William Frank Pounds
- Michael Sela
- Eugene B. Skolnikoff
- Herbert Tabor
- Michael Laban Walzer
- Bruce Wallace

== 1972 ==
- John Dickson Baldeschwieler
- Walter Fred Bodmer
- Marcel Paul Boiteux
- William Hines Bossert
- Guido Calabresi
- Donald L. D. Caspar
- John Elliott Dowling
- Charles Louis Fefferman
- George Brooks Field
- Edmond Henri Fischer
- Valerie Jane Goodall
- Arnold Carl Harberger
- János Kornai
- Leo Marx
- Michael Brendan McElroy
- Dana Stewart Scott
- Kip Stephen Thorne
- Pindaros Roy Vagelos
- Helen Hennessy Vendler

== 1973 ==
- Karl Frank Austen
- Eugene Braunwald
- James Edwin Darnell, Jr.
- Jared Mason Diamond
- Peter Martin Goldreich
- Ralph Edward Gomory
- Leo A. Goodman
- Hanna Holborn Gray
- James Moody Gustafson
- Daniel J. Kleitman
- Donald Ervin Knuth
- Israel Robert Lehman
- Rudolph Arthur Marcus
- Calvin Cooper Moore
- Gordon Hemenway Pettengill
- Guy Rocher
- Richard Leon Sidman
- Nur Osman Yalman

== 1974 ==
- Stephen Louis Adler
- Clarence Roderic Allen
- Richard Chatham Atkinson
- Robert John Aumann
- W. Gerald Austen
- David Baltimore
- John Simmons Barth
- James Daniel Bjorken
- Daniel Branton
- Victor Henri Brombert
- Edgar H. Brown, Jr.
- Herman Chernoff
- Leon N. Cooper
- Richard Newell Cooper
- David Roxbee Cox
- Frank Donald Drake
- Leo Esaki
- Robert W. Floyd
- Richard Newton Gardner
- Ivar Giaever
- Sheldon Glashow
- Timothy Henshaw Goldsmith
- Gordon G. Hammes
- Harold John Hanham
- Berthold Karl Holldobler
- Frank Matthew Huennekens
- Brian David Josephson
- David Kipnis
- Emmanuel Bernard Le Roy Ladurie
- Gustav Joseph Victor Nossal
- Harry Rubin
- Malvin Avram Ruderman
- Martin Mathew Shapiro
- Eleanor Bernert Sheldon
- Otto Thomas Solbrig
- Alar Toomre
- Ezra F. Vogel

== 1975 ==
- Winslow Russell Briggs
- James Paddock Collman
- E. Peter Geiduschek
- David Herlihy
- Marion Frederick Hawthorne
- John Joseph Hopfield
- Yuan Tseh Lee
- Jeremiah Paul Ostriker
- Elena V. Paducheva
- Sheldon Penman
- Alvin Carl Plantinga
- John Pocock
- Michael Oser Rabin
- Calyampudi Radakrishna Rao
- Martin John Rees
- Edward Reich
- Charles Clifton Richardson
- Carlo Rubbia
- Lubert Stryer
- Samuel C.C. Ting
- Harrison Colyar White
- George McClelland Whitesides

== 1976 ==
- Julius Adler
- Rodney Armstrong
- Frederick George Bailey
- Brian Joe Lobley Berry
- John I. Brauman
- Frederick Phillips Brooks, Jr.
- Thomas Charles Bruice
- Bruno Coppi
- Owen Gingerich
- Roy G. Gordon
- David S. Hogness
- John Woodside Hutchinson
- Eric Richard Kandel
- Kenneth Irwin Kellermann
- Edward Arthur Kravitz
- William Labov
- Reimar Lust
- Chandra Kumar Naranbhai Patel
- John Charles Polanyi
- Marshall David Sahlins
- Speros Vryonis, Jr.
- William Barry Wood
- Richard Neil Zare

== 1977 ==
- Anthony Guy Amsterdam
- Francisco Jose Ayala
- Glen Warren Bowersock
- Anthony Downs
- John Huxtable Elliott
- Lawrence M. Friedman
- Avram Jacob Goldberg
- Irving H. Goldberg
- Jeffrey Goldstone
- Lee Grodzins
- Francois Gros
- James Edward Gunn
- Eric Donald Hirsch, Jr.
- William Edward Leuchtenburg
- Richard Siegmund Lindzen
- William James McCune Jr.
- Daniel Little McFadden
- John Williams Mellor
- Elizabeth Fondal Neufeld
- P. James E. Peebles
- Mark Steven Ptashne
- Peter Hamilton Raven
- John Rogers Searle
- Nathan Sivin
- Andrew Streitwieser, Jr.
- Peter Albert Strittmatter
- Paul Edward Waggoner
- Tai Tsun Wu

== 1978 ==
- Bruce Michael Alberts
- Suzanne Berger
- R. Stephen Berry
- Floyd Elliott Bloom
- Walter Dean Burnham
- Stanley Norman Cohen
- Pierre Deligne
- Hector Floyd DeLuca
- John Mark Deutch
- Peter Arthur Diamond
- Theodor Otto Diener
- Jacques H. Dreze
- Richard A. Easterlin
- Thomas V. Gamkrelidze
- Theodore Henry Geballe
- Johannes Geiss
- John Bertrand Gurdon
- Robert Louis Herbert
- Roman Wladimir Jackiw
- Arthur Michael Jaffe
- Donald R. Kelley
- George Alexander Kennedy
- Gerald Holmes Kramer
- Saul Aaron Kripke
- Barry Charles Mazur
- James Robert Rice
- Andrew Victor Schally
- Maxine Frank Singer
- Charles Francis Westoff
- Robert Woodrow Wilson
- Evelyn Maisel Witkin

== 1979 ==
- Enrico Bombieri
- Herbert Wayne Boyer
- Peter Robert Lamont Brown
- John Somerset Chipman
- John Rouben David
- Paul A. David
- Natalie Zemon Davis
- Stanley Deser
- Michael Ellis Fisher
- Hans Emil Frauenfelder
- Harry Barkus Gray
- Guido Guidotti
- Melvin Lester Kohn
- Masakazu Konishi
- Gene Elden Likens
- Arno J. Mayer
- Kenneth Prewitt
- Leon Theodore Silver
- Solomon Halbert Snyder
- Lynn Sykes
- Peter Hans von Hippel
- Carl Christian von Weizsäcker
- Benjamin Widom
- Carl Isaac Wunsch

== 1980 ==
- Albert Bandura
- Emilio Bizzi
- Gerhard Casper
- Robert Choate Darnton
- Merton Corson Flemings
- Jerome Isaac Friedman
- Edwin Jean Furshpan
- Kent Greenawalt
- Edward Crosby Johnson
- Ivan Robert King
- Joseph LaPalombara
- Jean-Marie Pierre Lehn
- Robert Emerson Lucas, Jr.
- Joseph Boyd Martin
- William Frederick Miller
- Claes Thure Oldenburg
- Ronald Howard Paulson
- Edmund Strother Phelps
- David Pines
- Hanna Fenichel Pitkin
- Robert David Putnam
- David Domingo Sabatini
- Roger Newland Shepard
- David Arthur Shirley
- Hamilton Othanel Smith
- Laurence Henry Tribe
- Mack Walker
- George Masters Woodwell
- Israel Zelitch

== 1981 ==
- Robert Lesh Baldwin
- Hyman Bass
- Gordon Alan Baym
- Overton Brent Berlin
- Robert Bird
- Michael Stuart Brown
- Michael Cole
- Kenneth W. Dam
- Wallace Gary Ernst
- Donald Lee Fanger
- Gary Felsenfeld
- Stanley Fischer
- James Gilbert Glimm
- Joseph Leonard Goldstein
- Loren Raymond Graham
- Bertrand Israel Halperin
- Leslie Lars Iversen
- Nelson Yuan-Sheng Kiang
- Thomas Nagel
- Robert Owen Paxton
- Nicholas P. Samios
- Amartya Kumar Sen
- Hugh Pettingill Taylor Jr.
- Seiya Uyeda
- Robert Butler Wilson

== 1982 ==
- Jagdish N. Bhagwati
- Paul Brest
- Stephen G. Breyer
- Herbert Horace Clark
- William Henry Danforth
- Peter Demetz
- Paul Ralph Ehrlich
- Victor Robert Fuchs
- Herbert J. Gans
- Howard Georgi
- Ruth Bader Ginsburg
- Kurt Gottfried
- Roy Walter Gould
- Paul R. Gross
- Leroy Edward Hood
- Akira Iriye
- M. Kent Jennings
- Clifford Charles Lamberg-Karlovsky
- Beatrice Mintz
- Harold Alfred Mooney
- Douglas Dean Osheroff
- Charles Dacre Parsons
- Richard A. Posner
- John Thomas Potts, Jr.
- Jesse Roth
- Bengt Ingemar Samuelsson
- Franklin William Stahl
- Joan Argetsinger Steitz
- Joseph Hooton Taylor Jr.
- David William Tracy
- Barry Martin Trost
- James Wei
- Jean Donald Wilson
- Christoph Wolff
- Amnon Zalman Yariv
- Theodore Joseph Ziolkowski

== 1983 ==
- Peter Shaw Ashton
- Richard Axel
- Robert Weierter Balluffi
- Olle Björkman
- Jesse Choper
- Denis Donoghue
- Bradley Efron
- Martin Gellert
- Gerhard Giebisch
- Victor Guillemin
- Theodor W. Hänsch
- Prudence Oliver Harper
- Hugh Heclo
- John Holdren
- Erich P. Ippen
- Ronald W. Jones
- David B. Kaplan
- Robert Keohane
- Anne Osborn Krueger
- James S. Langer
- Stanley Lieberson
- David G. Nathan
- Fernando Nottebohm
- Douglas W. Rae
- Arthur Harold Rubenstein
- Thomas J. Sargent
- Phillip Allen Sharp
- Yakov Sinai
- Gábor A. Somorjai
- Michael Spence
- Harold Stark
- Joseph Stiglitz
- Keith Thomas
- Ray Weymann
- Shmuel Winograd
- Shing-Tung Yau

== 1984 ==
- Werner Arber
- George Bernard Benedek
- Stephen James Benkovic
- Robert George Bergman
- John Michael Bishop
- William Browder
- Burrell Clark Burchfiel
- George Cardona
- Fernando Henrique Cardoso
- Samuel J. Danishefsky
- Melvin Aron Eisenberg
- Raymond Leo Erikson
- Gerald R. Fink
- Morris Paul Fiorina
- Dagfinn Kaare Follesdal
- Ian Michael Glynn
- Edward Grant
- Jürgen Habermas
- Robert M. Hauser
- Joseph Frederick Hoffman
- Nick Holonyak, Jr.
- Jasper Johns
- Nicole Marthe Le Douarin
- Jack Lewis
- Lewis Henry Lockwood
- David Raymond Mayhew
- Hugh O'Neill McDevitt
- Robert Lawrence Middlekauff
- Sally Falk Moore
- William D. Nordhaus
- Joseph Samuel Nye
- Tomoko Ohta
- Barbara Hall Partee
- Paul Linford Richards
- Matthew Daniel Scharff
- Karl Barry Sharpless
- Eytan Sheshinski
- Hugo Freund Sonnenschein
- Charles F. Stevens
- Monkombu S. Swaminathan
- Susumu Tonegawa
- James William Valentine
- James Chuo Wang
- Edward Witten

== 1985 ==
- John Norman Abelson
- George A. Akerlof
- Takeshi Amemiya
- James Gilbert Anderson
- Robert Axelrod
- Jonathan Francis Bennett
- Howard Curtis Berg
- David Botstein
- Alfred Brendel
- Pierre Chambon
- Yvonne Choquet-Bruhat
- Richard Earl Dickerson
- Russell F. Doolittle
- Stanley L. Engerman
- Richard A. Epstein
- John Arthur Ferejohn
- Stanley Eugene Fish
- Michael H. Freedman
- Michael Fried
- Antonio García-Bellido
- David Marvin Green
- David Jonathan Gross
- Robert Ernest Hall
- James Joseph Heckman
- Fredric R. Jameson
- Richard M. Karp
- Yoshito Kishi
- Alasdair MacIntyre
- Thomas Peter Maniatis
- Hubert S. Markl
- Andreu Mas-Colell
- Fred Warren McLafferty
- Mary Lou Pardue
- David Roger Pilbeam
- Charles Raymond Plott
- Diane Silvers Ravitch
- Roland W. Schmitt
- Jonathan Dermot Spence
- William Gilbert Strang
- Robert Endre Tarjan
- Karen Keskulla Uhlenbeck
- Alice Tallulah Kate Walker
- Christopher Thomas Walsh
- Daniel I-Chyau Wang
- Charles Weissmann
- Harriet Anne Zuckerman

== 1986 ==
- Gerard 't Hooft
- Bruce Arnold Ackerman
- Perry Lee Adkisson
- Robert Alter
- Jonathan Roger Beckwith
- Peter John Bickel
- Ralph Lawrence Brinster
- Peter Stephen Paul Brook
- Robert Sanford Brustein
- Luis Angel Caffarelli
- John Anthony Carbon
- Stephen A. Cook
- Paul Josef Crutzen
- Derek A. Denton
- Mostafa Amr El-Sayed
- Alain Enthoven
- Ray Franklin Evert
- Daniel Z. Freedman
- David Pierpont Gardner
- Carlo Ginzburg
- Ronald Lewis Graham
- Erich S. Gruen
- Masayori Inouye
- Robert Jervis
- Howard Ronald Kaback
- Daniel Kleppner
- Albert Joseph Libchaber
- Hans Arthur Linde
- Stephen James Lippard
- Richard Burt Melrose
- Robert C. Merton
- Frank Isaac Michelman
- Cynthia Ozick
- Peter Mark Paret
- Michael I. Posner
- Samuel Preston
- Chintamani Nagesa Ramachandra Rao
- Charles Ernest Rosenberg
- Walter Garrison Runciman
- Charles Vernon Shank
- Quentin Robert Duthie Skinner
- Tom Stoppard
- Charles Margrave Taylor
- Peter Temin
- Endel Tulving

== 1987 ==
- Claude Jean Allègre
- Aharon Barak
- Robert J. Birgeneau
- David Edgeworth Butler
- Curtis G. Callan
- Georges N. Cohen
- Earl W. Davie
- Carl-Wilhelm Reinhold de Boor
- Daniel Dennett
- Patricia K. Donahoe
- Marcus William Feldman
- Avner Friedman
- Brian Albert Gerrish
- Robert Gilpin
- Stephen Greenblatt
- Alan H. Guth
- Robert Haselkorn
- Donald Helinski
- Alan Jerome Hoffman
- John Edward Hopcroft
- Peter J. Huber
- Jiri Jonas
- Hiroo Kanamori
- Peter Katzenstein
- Herbert Kaufman
- Andrew Herbert Knoll
- Walter LaFeber
- John H. Langbein
- Susan Epstein Leeman
- Donald Harris Levy
- Leon Litwack
- Bernard Lown
- Harry M. Markowitz
- Albert R. Meyer
- Nicholas Avrion Mitchison
- Joel Moses
- Gregory Nagy
- Takeshi Oka
- Paul H. Rabinowitz
- William J. Rutter
- Terrance Sandalow
- Paul Reinhard Schimmel
- Benno Charles Schmidt, Jr.
- Roy Frederick Schwitters
- Melvin I. Simon
- Wole Soyinka
- Richard B. Stewart
- Stephen M. Stigler
- William Clark Still
- Lawrence H. Summers
- John Whittle Terborgh
- Roberto Mangabeira Unger
- Alexander Varshavsky
- Larzer Ziff

== 1988 ==
- Sidney Altman
- David Arnett
- Margaret Atwood
- Robert Joseph Barro
- Max Marcell Burger
- Friedrich Hermann Busse
- Charles R. Cantor
- Thomas Robert Cech
- James Franklin Childress
- Purnell W. Choppin
- John MacLeod Chowning
- Pedro M. Cuatrecasas
- Peter Brendan Dervan
- Glen Holl Elder, Jr.
- Jon Elster
- David Albert Evans
- Alan Roy Fersht
- Gerald David Fischbach
- Patricia Albjerg Graham
- Sanford Jay Grossman
- Willy Haeberli
- Oliver Simon D'Arcy Hart
- Daniel L. Heartz
- John L. Heilbron
- Julian Hochberg
- Richard Joseph Howard
- Susan Werner Kieffer
- Stuart Arthur Kornfeld
- Heather Nan Lechtman
- Robert Joseph Lefkowitz
- N. David Mermin
- Henry P. Monaghan
- David Robert Nelson
- Martha Craven Nussbaum
- Richard Deforest Palmiter
- John Winsor Pratt
- John Michael Prausnitz
- Simon Michael Schama
- Richard Melvin Schoen
- Christopher A. Sims
- Edwin M. Southern
- Richard Peter Stanley
- Steven Mitchell Stanley
- Peter David Lyman Stansky
- Wayne Thiebaud
- Samuel Osiah Thier
- Tu Weiming
- Srinivasa Rangaiyengar Varadhan
- Harold Eliot Varmus
- Wlodzimierz Józef Wesolowski
- Marina von Neumann Whitman
- Sheila Evans Widnall
- William Julius Wilson
- Gordon Stewart Wood
- Mark Stephen Wrighton
- Menahem Yaari

== 1989 ==
- Barbara Aronstein Black
- David W. Brady
- Alfred Yi Cho
- Ching-Wu Paul Chu
- John Adam Clausen
- Joel Ephraim Cohen
- Alain Connes
- Joan Ganz Cooney
- Igor Bert Dawid
- Persi Diaconis
- Joan Didion
- Wendy Doniger
- Margaret Drabble
- Harry T. Edwards
- Sandra Moore Faber
- Eugene F. Fama
- Nina V. Fedoroff
- John E. Ffowcs-Williams
- Eric Foner
- Mary Katharine Ralph Gaillard
- James F. Gibbons
- Vartan Gregorian
- Mikhael Gromov
- Stephen Coplan Harrison
- James Burkett Hartle
- Wu-chung Hsiang
- Charles Oscar Jones
- Thomas J. Kelly, Jr.
- Paul Michael Kennedy
- Marc Wallace Kirschner
- Edward E. Leamer
- Robert Alan LeVine
- Arend Lijphart
- Assar Lindbeck
- Anthony Arthur Long
- Elizabeth McCormack
- Newton N. Minow
- Mortimer Mishkin
- Roy Parviz Mottahedeh
- William James Perry
- George Putnam
- Michael Llewellyn Rutter
- Sandra Wood Scarr
- Richard Royce Schrock
- Howard Stein
- Patrick Thaddeus
- Judith Jarvis Thomson
- Jürgen Troe
- Emil Raphael Unanue
- Thomas Alexander Waldmann
- Robert Allan Weinberg
- Keith Robert Yamamoto

== 1990 ==
- James Roger Prior Angel
- Allen Joseph Bard
- Stephen Davison Bechtel, Jr.
- Olivier Blanchard
- Barry R. Bloom
- Robert Hamilton Cannon, Jr.
- Michael John Chamberlin
- Paul M. Cook
- Malcolm Roderick Currie
- Peter Florian Dembowski
- Mark di Suvero
- James Louis Dye
- Friedrich Ehrendorfer
- Thomas Eugene Everhart
- John Hurley Flavell
- Marion R. Fremont-Smith
- Robert Alan Frosch
- Margaret Joan Geller
- Allan F. Gibbard
- Gerald Verne Gibbs
- Roger Anthony Gorski
- Richard Herr
- Karen Elliott House
- Daniel Hunt Janzen
- Vernon Eulion Jordan Jr.
- Marvin Kalb
- Helene L. Kaplan
- Daniel Jerome Kevles
- Robert Phelan Langlands
- Gerald David Laubach
- Robert B. Laughlin
- David Morris Lee
- J. David Litster
- Susan Lowey
- Jane Menken
- Gordon Earle Moore
- John Mueller
- Masatoshi Nei
- Thomas Dean Pollard
- Judith Seitz Rodin
- Pierre Rosenberg
- Roald Zinnurovich Sagdeev
- Nayantara Sahgal
- J. William Schopf
- Peter G. Schultz
- Harold Tafler Shapiro
- Yuen-Ron Shen
- Kenneth A. Shepsle
- Raymond Stuart Stata
- John Meurig Thomas
- Shirley M. Tilghman
- Arnold Robert Weber
- Jack Bertrand Weinstein
- Irving Lerner Weissman
- Finis R. Welch
- Shirley Williams
- Robert Henry Wurtz
- John Alan Young
- Franklin Ester Zimring

== 1991 ==
- Robert Merrihew Adams
- Svetlana Alpers
- John Allan Armstrong
- David Attenborough
- Keith Michael Baker
- Jacqueline K. Barton
- Robert Hinrichs Bates
- Malcolm Roy Beasley
- John E. Bercaw
- Elizabeth Blackburn
- Alan Stuart Blinder
- John A. Brinkman
- Sarah Waterlow Broadie
- Peter Brooks
- Steve S. Chen
- Alexandre Joel Chorin
- Robert Charles Clark
- J. M. Coetzee
- Frederick Campbell Crews
- Edwin Munson Curley
- Partha Sarathi Dasgupta
- John W. Dower
- John M. Dunn
- Peter Duus
- Igor Dzyaloshinskii
- Marian Wright Edelman
- David Samuel Eisenberg
- Marilyn G. Farquhar
- Anthony Stephen Fauci
- David L. Featherman
- Edward A. Feigenbaum
- James W. Fernandez
- Graham Richard Fleming
- Bertram O. Fraser-Reid
- Frank Owen Gehry
- Carol Gluck
- Ann M. Graybiel
- Christine Guthrie
- Ian Hacking
- Eugene Alfred Hammel
- Clayton Howell Heathcock
- Richard H. Helmholz
- Roger H. Hildebrand
- Christopher Hogg
- Lynn Hunt
- James A. Ibers
- Shirley Ann Jackson
- Gary C. Jacobson
- Joshua Jortner
- Paul L. Joskow
- C. Ronald Kahn
- Stanley N. Katz
- Nannerl O. Keohane
- John Wells Kingdon
- Nancy Elizabeth Kleckner
- Richard G. Klein
- Steven Elliot Koonin
- Stephen D. Krasner
- Patrick A. Lee
- David Charles Lindberg
- George Lusztig
- Peter S. Lynch
- Robert B. W. MacNeil
- Charles Steven Maier
- Philippa Marrack
- Gail Roberta Martin
- Jerry L. Mashaw
- Walter E. Massey
- Carver Andress Mead
- Elliot M. Meyerowitz
- Bill D. Moyers
- Laura Nader
- Donald A. Norman
- Gordon Howell Orians
- Donald Samuel Ornstein
- Stephen Owen
- Norman Richard Pace Jr.
- Orlando Patterson
- Walter Keith Percival
- Alexander M. Polyakov
- George Bingham Powell, Jr.
- Adam Przeworski
- Franklin Delano Raines
- Uttam L. RajBhandary
- Jane S. Richardson
- Christopher Bruce Ricks
- David Rockefeller, Jr.
- Felix Rohatyn
- Bernard Roizman
- Michael Geoffrey Rosenfeld
- Neil L. Rudenstine
- Joan V. Ruderman
- Peter Clive Sarnak
- Thomas William Schoener
- William R. Schowalter
- David O'Keefe Sears
- John H. Seinfeld
- Saharon Shelah
- Michael Silverstein
- Merritt Roe Smith
- Vernon Lomax Smith
- Allan Charles Spradling
- Edward Manin Stolper
- Daniel Wyler Stroock
- Joanne Stubbe
- Dennis Parnell Sullivan
- Harry L. Swinney
- Edwin William Taylor
- Arnold Wilfrid Thackray
- Franklin Augustine Thomas
- Kenneth Lane Thompson
- Maury Tigner
- Robert Warren Tucker
- Jean-Didier Vincent
- Frederick Wiseman
- Peter Guy Wolynes
- Richard Jay Zeckhauser

== 1992 ==
- Hans C. Andersen
- Julia Elizabeth Annas
- Janis Antonovics
- Elliot Aronson
- Michael George Aschbacher
- Norman R. Augustine
- David H. Auston
- J. P. Barger
- Denis Aristide Baylor
- Hans Belting
- Leo Bersani
- Frank Bidart
- John Herron Biggs
- Thomas Noel Bisson
- Lee C. Bollinger
- Henry Reid Bourne
- Harvey Kent Bowen
- William Frank Brinkman
- William Allen Brock III
- Richard Alan Brody
- Donald Jerome Brown
- Amyand David Buckingham
- Bruce J. Bueno de Mesquita
- Warren Edward Buffett
- Myles Fredric Burnyeat
- Ashton Carter
- Sylvia Teresse Aida Ceyer
- Sallie Watson Chisholm
- Steven Chu
- Aaron Victor Cicourel
- Timothy James Clark
- Michael Tran Clegg
- Marshall H. Cohen
- Claude Nessim Cohen-Tannoudji
- Jonathan Richard Cole
- Walter Robert Connor
- Max Dale Cooper
- Lynn A. Cooper
- Lawrence Frederick Dahl
- Gary Brent Dalrymple
- Marc Davis
- Angus Stewart Deaton
- Haile Tesfaye Debas
- Francis Joseph DiSalvo, Jr.
- David Donoho
- David Roach Dowty
- Frank Hoover Easterbrook
- Phoebe C. Ellsworth
- Reynolds Farley
- Joseph Felsenstein
- David Finn
- Leon Fleisher
- Daniel Willett Foster
- Peter L. Galison
- William Gates
- Claudia Goldin
- Jerry Paul Gollub
- Jean-Michel Grandmont
- Benedict Hyman Gross
- Carol A. Gross
- Frederick Duncan Michael Haldane
- Michael Thomas Hannan
- Conrad Kenneth Harper
- Juris Hartmanis
- Wayne A. Hendrickson
- W. Daniel Hillis
- Melvin Hochster
- Stephen Taylor Holmes
- Sarah Blaffer Hrdy
- Tony Hunter
- Rudolf Jaenisch
- Raymond Jeanloz
- Christopher Jencks
- Thomas M. Jessell
- Peter R. Kann
- John Albert Katzenellenbogen
- Amalya Lyle Kearse
- Edmund Keeley
- Maxine Hong Kingston
- Patrick Vinton Kirch
- Robert P. Kirshner
- Arthur Michael Kleinman
- David Marc Kreps
- Paul R. Krugman
- Sidney Leibovich
- Estella Bergere Leopold
- Wolf Lepenies
- Simon Asher Levin
- Barbara Huberman Liskov
- Robert Wendell Lucky
- Robert Duncan MacPherson
- David Baruch Malament
- Cyril Alexander Mango
- Grigoriy Margulis
- Pamela A. Matson
- John Henry McDowell
- James Lafayette McGaugh
- Donald F. McHenry
- Steven Lanier McKnight
- Ernesto Antonio Medina
- James Donald Meindl
- Paul Robert Milgrom
- Martha Louise Minow
- Kiyoshi Mizuuchi
- Navarre Scott Momaday
- Shigefumi Mori
- Royce Wilton Murray
- Erwin Neher
- Maria Iandolo New
- Richard E. Nisbett
- Philippe Pierre Nozieres
- Christiane Nusslein-Volhard
- Peter Carl Ordeshook
- Sherry Beth Ortner
- Seiji Ozawa
- Elaine Pagels
- Ira Harry Pastan
- Donald Wells Pfaff
- Edward C. Prescott
- Shulamit Ran
- Joseph Raz
- Seymour Reichlin
- Anna Curtenius Roosevelt
- Howard Lewis Rosenthal
- Gerald Mayer Rubin
- David P. Ruelle
- Bert Sakmann
- Sebastiao Ribeiro Salgado
- Douglas James Scalapino
- Elaine Scarry
- Jose A. Scheinkman
- Albrecht Schone
- James C. Scott
- Donna Shalala
- Lucille Shapiro
- Carla Jo Shatz
- James John Sheehan
- Frank H. Shu
- Adele Smith Simmons
- Alvaro Siza
- Leonard Edward Slatkin
- Robert Eugene Somerville
- George Sperling
- Robert Stalnaker
- Rosemary A. Stevens
- Ursula Beate Storb
- Nobuo Suga
- Cass R. Sunstein
- Rashid Alievich Sunyaev
- Sidney G. Tarrow
- Susan S. Taylor
- Jacques Leon Tits
- Scott D. Tremaine
- Richard Francis Tuck
- Bert Vogelstein
- Alan David Weinstein
- Paul Anthony Wender
- James Boyd White
- John Edgar Wideman
- David Wiggins
- Jack Wisdom
- John Armstead Wood
- Arnold Melchior Zwicky

== 1993 ==
- Henry Jacob Aaron
- Andreas Acrivos
- Walter Alvarez
- Thomas W. Appelquist
- Michael Ashburner
- Michael Farries Ashby
- Orley Clark Ashenfelter
- Roger David Blandford
- R. Howard Bloch
- Martin Blume
- Sheila Ellen Blumstein
- Joan Toland Bok
- Leon Botstein
- David Ross Brillinger
- Alison Spence Brooks
- Charles Tyler Burge
- Ronald Stuart Burt
- Caroline Walker Bynum
- Sharon Cameron
- Robert Campbell
- James Earl Carter, Jr.
- Charles Philip Casey
- Mary-Dell Matchett Chilton
- Marvin Lou Cohen
- R. John Collier
- Elizabeth Cropper
- James E. Dahlberg
- Lorraine Jenifer Daston
- Ingrid Chantal Daubechies
- John Putnam Demos
- Charles Dempsey
- Albrecht Dihle
- Alan Michael Dressler
- James Johnson Duderstadt
- Thomas Dunne
- Felton James Earls
- John S. Earman
- Gerhard Ludwig Ertl
- George Myles Cordell Fisher
- Kenneth Frampton
- Norman C. Francis
- Lambert Ben Freund
- Bruce Woodward Frier
- James Castle Gaither
- Marc S. Galanter
- Henry Louis Gates, Jr.
- Louise Elisabeth Gluck
- Lawrence Marshall Gold
- Peter Carl Goldmark, Jr.
- Corey Scott Goodman
- Norma Van Surdam Graham
- John Taylor Groves
- Charles Vernon Hamilton
- Lars Peter Hansen
- Neil Harris
- Elhanan Helpman
- Dieter Henrich
- Arnold Selig Hiatt
- Paul Felix Hoffman
- Bengt Robert Holmstrom
- Donald Leonard Horowitz
- Morton J. Horwitz
- Roger Evans Howe
- Kazuo Ishiguro
- Vaughan Frederick Randal Jones
- Daniel Kahneman
- Yuet Wai Kan
- Benita S. Katzenellenbogen
- Thomas Michael Keneally
- Donald R. Kinder
- Judith Pollock Klinman
- Ludwig Koenen
- Nicolai Vladimirovich Krylov
- Butler W. Lampson
- Lynn Therese Landmesser
- Richard O. Lempert
- Jane Lubchenco
- William H. Luers
- Yo-Yo Ma
- Anthony Peter Mahowald
- Thomas Edward Mann
- Tobin Jay Marks
- Barbara Joyce McNeil
- John Angus McPhee
- Mary Patterson McPherson
- David Mechanic
- William Hughes Miller
- Jose Rafael Moneo Valles
- Roger B. Myerson
- Tetsuo Najita
- Eldon Henry Newcomb
- Kyriacos Costa Nicolaou
- Mary Jo Nye
- Onora Sylvia O'Neill
- Marcel Ophuls
- Stuart Holland Orkin
- Yuri Fyodorovich Orlov
- Carl O. Pabo
- Stanley Ben Prusiner
- Albert Jordy Raboteau
- Julius Rebek, Jr.
- Frank Morris Richter
- Robert Eric Ricklefs
- Lynn Moorhead Riddiford
- Ronald Linn Rivest
- Lee David Ross
- Joan Elizabeth Roughgarden
- Donald Bruce Rubin
- Erkki Ruoslahti
- George Erik Rupp
- Robert Thomas Sauer
- Thomas Michael Scanlon, Jr.
- Frederick Franklin Schauer
- Ernst-Detlef Schulze
- Howard Schuman
- Edward M. Scolnick
- Denise Scott Brown
- Anthony Seeger
- Richard Serra
- Eric Manvers Shooter
- Daniel Solomon Simberloff
- John Brooks Slaughter
- H. Colin Slim
- Richard Alan Smith
- Barbara Boardman Smuts
- Gary Snyder
- Susan Solomon
- Jack C. Stillinger
- Nancy L. Stokey
- Gisela Striker
- John Brian Taylor
- Twyla Tharp
- Marta Tienda
- Jean Marcel Tirole
- George Henry Trilling
- Garretson Beekman Trudeau
- Olke Cornelis Uhlenbeck
- Jonathan William Uhr
- Herman Van Der Wee
- Peter M. Vitousek
- David Weiss Halivni
- Eric F. Wieschaus
- Frank Wilczek
- Garry Wills
- Richard W. Wrangham
- Gavin Wright
- Kurt Wuthrich
