= Henry Bourne =

Henry Bourne may refer to:

- Henry Bourne (historian) (c.1694–1733), British historian
- Henry Bourne (pharmacologist) (1940–2023), American pharmacologist and cell biologist
- Henry C. Bourne Jr. (1921–2010), American electrical engineer and university administrator
- Henry de Bourne (fl. 1313), British politician
- Henry Fox Bourne (1837–1909), British social reformer and writer
- Henry Bourne (photographer) (fl. 1980s–2020s), British photographer

== See also ==
- Henry Bourne Joy (1864–1936), president of the Packard Motor Car Company
