= Landmesser =

Landmesser (German for "surveyor") is a German surname. Notable people with the surname include:

- August Landmesser (1910–1944), German shipyard worker
- Derek Landmesser (born 1975), Canadian ice hockey player and coach
- Lynn T. Landmesser (1943–2024), American neuroscientist
- Ulf Landmesser (born 1970), German specialist for cardiology and internal medicine

== See also ==
- Art Landy (born Arthur Charles Landmesser; 1904–1977), American animator specialised in animation set decoration
