= Charlie Dempsey =

Charlie Dempsey may refer to:

- Charlie Dempsey (football administrator) (1921–2008) , Scottish-born New Zealand association football administrator
- Charlie Dempsey (wrestler) (born 1996), British-American professional wrestler

== See also ==
- Charles Dempsey (1937–2022), American art historian
