= Joan Roughgarden =

American ecologist (born 1946)

- Roughgarden's Portrait
- Born: March 13, 1946 (age 80); Paterson, New Jersey, U.S.
- Education: University of Rochester (BS, BA); Harvard University (MS, PhD)
- Known for: Ecological and population-genetic modeling; Caribbean Anolis and intertidal recruitment studies; critique of sexual selection; holobiont models
- Scientific career
- Fields: Ecology, evolutionary biology
- Workplaces: University of Massachusetts Boston; Stanford University; Hawaiʻi Institute of Marine Biology
- Thesis: Implications of density dependent natural selection (1971)
- Doctoral advisor: William H. Bossert

Joan Roughgarden (born March 13, 1946) is an American theoretical ecologist and evolutionary biologist. She is professor of biology and of geophysics emerita at Stanford University and an adjunct researcher at the Hawaiʻi Institute of Marine Biology. She combined mathematical theory with field studies of Caribbean Anolis lizards and of larval recruitment in rocky-intertidal barnacles, wrote textbooks in ecological and evolutionary theory, and founded Stanford's Earth Systems Program.

From the 2000s she also became known outside ecology for books and papers criticizing Darwin's theory of sexual selection and proposing an alternative she called social selection. Secondary sources have treated her survey of sexual and gender diversity in animals as influential in public and interdisciplinary discussion, while describing the proposed replacement of sexual selection as contested. She is a fellow of the American Academy of Arts and Sciences and received the 2005 Stonewall Book Award for Evolution's Rainbow.

== Early life and education ==
Roughgarden was born in Paterson, New Jersey. She received a B.S. in biology, and a B.A. in philosophy from the University of Rochester in 1968, and an M.S. and Ph.D. in biology from Harvard University in 1971. Her doctoral work on density-dependent natural selection, supervised by William H. Bossert, appeared the same year as a paper in Ecology.

In 1998 she came out as transgender.

== Career ==
She taught at the University of Massachusetts Boston from 1970 to 1972, then joined Stanford's Department of Biology in 1972. She was also appointed in geophysics and remained at Stanford until retiring in 2011 as professor of biology and of geophysics emerita. From 1992 to 1999 she founded and directed Stanford's Earth Systems Program.

As of 2026 she lived in Santa Rosa, California.

== Research ==
=== Ecological theory, anoles, and intertidal recruitment ===
The 1971 density-dependence paper and the 1979 textbook Theory of Population Genetics and Evolutionary Ecology presented a mathematical link between ecological population dynamics and gene-frequency change. The textbook was reprinted in 1987 and 1996.

In the 1970s and 1980s she and collaborators used eastern-Caribbean Anolis lizards as a model for competition and eco-evolutionary dynamics, work later collected in Anolis Lizards of the Caribbean (1995). Enclosure experiments with Stephen Pacala showed that the strength of interspecific competition increased with overlap in body size. Reviews of eco-evolutionary feedbacks have cited the anole system, developed further by Jonathan Losos and others, as a leading example of adaptive radiation.

At the Hopkins Marine Station she studied rocky-intertidal barnacles. With Steve Gaines and later Sean Connolly she argued that adult predation and competition structure communities mainly where oceanography allows dense settlement, whereas in central California barnacle numbers tracked pulsed larval recruitment after relaxation of upwelling. They related a latitudinal gradient in west-coast upwelling to stronger adult interactions in the north and stronger recruitment limitation in the south.

With colleagues she also published on fishery collapse and the economics of ecological stability. Roughgarden and Smith argued that ecologically stable fishery management places the target stock on the right-hand side of the production curve, above the stock producing maximum sustainable yield, making the stock less vulnerable to collapse. In related work with Paul Armsworth, she examined the economic value of ecological stability.

=== Sexual selection and social selection ===
In Evolution's Rainbow: Diversity, Gender, and Sexuality in Nature and People (2004; tenth-anniversary edition 2013), Roughgarden argued that standard sexual-selection theory does not account for the range of animal mating systems, sex change, multiple morphs within a sex, and same-sex sexual behavior. She proposed “social selection,” defined as selection on differential offspring production through social interaction rather than on differential mating success alone. On her account, sexual selection focuses on mating success and on competition, conflict, and genetic quality, whereas social selection focuses on offspring delivery and on negotiation, teamwork, and division of labor.

The book received the 2005 Stonewall Book Award for nonfiction and has been translated into Portuguese, Korean, and Spanish. Reviews treated the natural-history survey as valuable while dividing over the theoretical claim that social selection should replace sexual selection. Douglas J. Futuyma reviewed it in Evolution. The book has been cited beyond evolutionary biology, including in discussions of sex and gender in the humanities and social sciences, and it continues to appear in popular-science treatments of animal sexual diversity, among them Nathan H. Lents's 2025 book The Sexual Evolution. A 2025–2026 documentary, Second Nature: Gender and Sexuality in the Animal World, directed by Drew Denny and narrated by Elliot Page, featured her work on that subject.

A 2006 article in Science, with Erol Akçay and Meeko Oishi, recast some aspects of reproductive behavior in cooperative-game terms and argued that sexual selection should be replaced. Forty biologists published ten critical letters. Correspondents said the paper misrepresented sexual-selection theory and that the alternative did not explain data accounted for by the existing theory. Roughgarden replied that the dissent was expected and that social selection was not an extension of sexual selection. Tim Clutton-Brock, in a 2007 Science review, accepted that sexual selection can act on females as well as males but treated the framework as robust. In 2010 Roughgarden and Akçay replied in Animal Behaviour that extending sexual selection to females did not resolve what they regarded as contradictions in the framework, and they argued against redefining sexual selection as a “version 2.0” rather than replacing it.

In a 2014 BioScience feature, Arthur Allen described the proposed replacement as remaining outside the mainstream of evolutionary biology. In a 2019 interview Roughgarden said that most biologists remained defensive of sexual selection.

In 2025 she published a further comparison of the two frameworks in Biology of Sex Differences, setting out 26 points of disagreement. The paper contrasts the frameworks on questions including why sexual reproduction exists; why males, females, and hermaphrodites exist; what sex roles occur; whether males form a hierarchy of genetic quality; how many genders exist; and what function affiliative behavior, including same-sex mating, serves.

=== Theistic evolution ===
In Evolution and Christian Faith (2006) Roughgarden argued that evolutionary biology need not conflict with Christian scripture and opposed both creationism and intelligent design while affirming theistic evolution.

=== Holobionts ===
After retirement she published models of the holobiont (a host plus its microbial symbionts) and of related hologenome ideas associated with Lynn Margulis and with Ilana Zilber-Rosenberg and Eugene Rosenberg. A 2018 review with Scott F. Gilbert and others treated holobionts as possible units of selection. Subsequent papers distinguished vertical from horizontal microbial transmission.

Whether hosts and their microbes evolve as a unit is disputed. Nancy A. Moran and Daniel B. Sloan argued that limited vertical transmission undercuts hologenome selection; a 2019 news feature in the Proceedings of the National Academy of Sciences described the debate as unresolved. In 2023 Roughgarden's model showed that holobiont selection was possible with horizontal microbial transmission, but she argued that host-controlled assembly of the microbiome was more important in explaining microbiome–host integration. Related phage–bacteria models appeared in 2024 and 2026.

== Awards and honors ==
- Stonewall Book Award (nonfiction), 2005
- Center Fellow, National Center for Ecological Analysis and Synthesis, 1998
- Lloyd W. Dinkelspiel Award, Stanford University, 1995
- Visiting research fellow, Merton College, Oxford, 1994
- Fellow of the American Academy of Arts and Sciences, 1993
- Guggenheim Fellowship, 1985
- University Fellow, Stanford University, 1978

She has served as associate editor of The American Naturalist (1984–1989), Oecologia (1979–1982), Theoretical Population Biology (1975–1986), and Philosophy and Theory in Biology (from 2008), and as chair of the Theoretical Ecology Section of the Ecological Society of America (2002–2003).

== Selected works ==
- Roughgarden, J. Theory of Population Genetics and Evolutionary Ecology: An Introduction. Macmillan / Prentice Hall, 1979.
- Ehrlich, Paul R., and J. Roughgarden. The Science of Ecology. Macmillan, 1987.
- Roughgarden, Joan. Anolis Lizards of the Caribbean: Ecology, Evolution and Plate Tectonics. Oxford University Press, 1995.
- Roughgarden, Joan. Primer of Ecological Theory. Prentice Hall, 1997.
- Roughgarden, Joan. Evolution's Rainbow: Diversity, Gender and Sexuality in Nature and People. University of California Press, 2004.
- Roughgarden, Joan. Evolution and Christian Faith. Island Press, 2006.
- Roughgarden, Joan. The Genial Gene: Deconstructing Darwinian Selfishness. University of California Press, 2009.
- Roughgarden, Joan. Ram-2050: A Ramayana Epic for the Future. Kauai Institute, 2015.
