= Seymour Reichlin =

Renowned neuroendocrinologist (1924–present)

- Born: May 31, 1924 (age 102); United States
- Education: Antioch College, University of London
- Known for: Contributions to the field of neuroendocrinology
- Scientific career
- Fields: Endocrinology, Neuroendocrinology

Seymour Reichlin, M.D., Ph.D. is an American physician and neuroscientist in the field of neuroendocrinology. He contributed to understanding hypothalamic-pituitary relationships, stress responses, and hormonal regulation.

Reichlin authored more than 400 scholarly publications and held leadership roles including President of the Endocrine Society (1975–1976) and founding President of the Pituitary Society (1994). He has served on advisory boards for the National Institutes of Health (NIH) and Food and Drug Administration (FDA), editorial boards including The New England Journal of Medicine. In 1992, he was elected to the American Academy of Arts & Sciences, and in 1993, was awarded the Berthold Medal.

== Early life and education ==
Reichlin was born on the 31st of May, 1924, in New York City, the second of three children. His parents, Henry Reichlin and Celia Rosen Reichlin, immigrated to the United States around 1911 from Hlybokaye, Belarus. Henry Reichlin served in the U.S. Army in World War I, then ran a delicatessen in New York City, while Celia Reichlin worked in sales at Lord & Taylor.

=== College ===
After graduating from Stuyvesant High School in 1939 at age 15, he enrolled in the City College of New York. After his first year, he transferred to Antioch College for premedical training. While at Antioch, he studied the work of Walter Cannon on homeostasis and stress, which became a topic of his future research.

After graduating college, Reichlin enlisted in the US Army in 1943, at age 19. Following basic training, he was assigned to the Fitzsimons Army Medical Center in Aurora, Colorado to serve as a psychiatric orderly. His experience in treating soldiers returning from the front lines of World War II with psychological trauma further pushed him towards a career studying the biological basis of mental health.

After one year of service, he was admitted to the Washington University School of Medicine in 1944 and was honorably discharged from the Army to pursue a career in medicine through the newly-passed G.I. Bill. He graduated first in his class with honors in 1948.

== Academic career and contributions to research ==
=== Science studies ===
In 1952, Reichlin moved to London with his family to pursue a Ph.D. in Physiology at the University of London under Dr. Geoffrey Harris, known as the father of neuroendocrinology. Working as a fellow under Dr. Harris, Reichlin helped establish that the brain has an essential role in controlling the thyroid, challenging prevailing views that stress increases thyroid activity. His thesis and published studies contributed to the idea that the brain plays a central role in endocrine regulation.

Returning to the U.S., he joined the faculty of Washington University School of Medicine as an instructor and senior research fellow from 1954 to 1961, combining psychosomatic research with physiology. In 1962, Reichlin became Chief of Endocrinology at the University of Rochester School of Medicine, where his lab pioneered the use of radioimmunoassay for key hormones such as thyroid-stimulating hormone, growth hormone, and luteinizing hormone. His group identified hypothalamic regions controlling growth hormone, and integrated physical and psychological stress studies into clinical endocrinology, an innovative approach for the time.

By the 1960s, Reichlin was a recognized authority in the emerging field of neuroendocrinology. He was invited to write a seminal three-part series for The New England Journal of Medicine in 1963, which laid out the state of the field as it existed at the time, and authored the chapter on neuroendocrinology for five editions of the Williams Textbook of Endocrinology, which remains the "gold standard" industry textbook on endocrinology. As a member of the NIH Endocrinology Study Section, he played a key role in supporting research by Andrew Schally and Roger Guillemin, organizing a conference in 1969 that proved a turning point in the discovery of the structure of thyrotropin-releasing hormone and gonadotropin-releasing hormone, for which both men shared the 1977 Nobel Prize in Physiology or Medicine.

=== Research ===
From 1969 to 1972, Reichlin chaired the Department of Medical and Pediatric Specialties at the University of Connecticut School of Medicine, where he conducted studies on thyroid hormone metabolism, and some of the first research on pituitary function in individuals with gender dysphoria.

Seeking a greater focus on research, he moved to the Tufts University School of Medicine in 1972, where he became the Chief of Endocrinology and Director of the General Clinical Research Center at Tufts Medical Center. His research continued to uncover new dimensions of hypothalamic–pituitary interactions, including important studies on somatostatin and placental glucocorticoid receptors. His 1987 collaborative textbook, Clinical Neuroendocrinology, became a comprehensive reference in the field.

== Later years ==
After retiring from Tufts in 1991, Reichlin joined the University of Arizona College of Medicine, where he held the Mel and Enid Zukerman Professorship of psychoneuroimmunology and continued to study how the brain regulates immune responses. He concluded his research career as a Research Professor of Medicine before retiring in 1999.

Following his retirement, he has remained engaged with scientific research. He continues to study how stress affects hormone levels and the immune system, the body’s ability to maintain emotional balance through hormonal changes, the neuroendocrinology and neuroimmunology of Alzheimer's disease, and the neurobiological basis of ecstatic mysticism.

== Personal life ==
Reichlin was married to his wife Elinor (“Ellie”) for nearly 60 years until her death in 2011. Elinor's father, William Dameshek, was a pioneering hematologist. In 1977, Ellie Reichlin brought to light what are believed to be the earliest photographs of enslaved people in the United States.

Reichlin has three children (Seth, Douglas (d. 2024), and Ann), four grandchildren, and one great-grandchild. His son Seth Reichlin is a former executive at Pearson plc, and co-founder of CollegeAPP. His daughter Ann Reichlin is a sculptor and is nephew Dan Storper was the co-founder of Putumayo World Music. His grandson Elijah Reichlin-Melnick served in the New York State Senate from 2021–22, and his grandson Aaron Reichlin-Melnick is a leading authority on US immigration policy. His grandson Simon Bohn is a Ph.D. candidate in neuroscience at the University of Pennsylvania, and his granddaughter Eva Bohn is an education researcher at EAB.

Si Reichlin is also a sculptor.

== See also ==
- Natural science
