= Barbara Joyce McNeil =

American physician

Barbara Joyce McNeil is an American physician and the founding director of the Department of Health Care Policy at Harvard Medical School. McNeil is also a member of the National academy of Medicine, the American academy of Arts and Sciences, Blue Cross Technology Evaluation Commission, and the Patient Centered Outcomes Research Institute.

== Early life and education ==
McNeil was born in Cambridge, Massachusetts in 1941. She graduated from Emmanuel College with a degree in chemistry in 1962. She then studied medicine at Harvard Medical School, graduating in 1966. McNeil went on to complete a one-year internship in pediatrics at Massachusetts General Hospital, and began a doctorate program as a National Institutes of Health research fellow at Harvard. In 1972, she received her PhD in biological chemistry, later returning to clinical work and completing a residency program in radiology at Brigham and Women's Hospital.

== Career ==
After finishing her training, she stayed at Harvard's Brigham and Women's Hospital as an instructor of radiology beginning in 1974. By 1983, she had been appointed as a full professor of clinical epidemiology and radiology. Since 1990, she has been the Ridley Watts Professor of Health Care Policy at Harvard Medical School. McNeil's original career involved decision and cost-effectiveness analysis, conducting research involving technology assessment and quality of care. A more recent study McNeil conducted was supported by the Department of Veterans. The study focused on the quality of care veterans with cardiac disease received; the study led to many quality of care changes for veterans with cardiac disease. She has also spent working with various organizations focused on healthy policy, including Blue Cross Association, the Joint Commission on Accreditation of Health Care Organizations, and the Board on Health Services of the Institution of Medicine.
