= David Rutstein =

American physician

- Born: 1909; Wilkes-Barre, Pennsylvania
- Died: 1986 (aged 76–77); Cambridge, Massachusetts
- Education: Harvard College
- Medical career
- Field: Preventive medicine
- Institutions: Harvard Medical School

David Davis Rutstein (1909-1986) was a long-time faculty member at Harvard Medical School and an advocate for preventive medicine. He was one of the first physicians to use television as an outreach tool to inform the public about health concerns and research. Rutstein also played a national role in the organization of medical care in the United States, the integration of preventive medicine into patient care, and the measurement of medical outcomes.

== Life and medical career ==
David Rutstein was born in 1909 in Wilkes-Barre, Pennsylvania. He graduated from Harvard College in 1930 and from Harvard Medical School with an M.D. in 1934. He completed clinical training at Boston City Hospital and Children's Hospital Boston and taught at Albany Medical College and the Columbia University College of Physicians and Surgeons. He joined the Harvard Medical School faculty in 1947 as a professor and head of the Department of Preventive Medicine, a position he held until 1969. From 1966 to his retirement in 1975, he was the Ridley Watts professor of preventive medicine.

In his teaching career, Rutstein taught medical students preventive clinical medicine, focusing on the interfaces of basic sciences, epidemiology, design of experiments, biological engineering, and health services research. He conducted teaching rounds at Massachusetts General Hospital, Peter Bent Brigham Hospital (now Brigham and Women's Hospital, Boston City Hospital, and the Rheumatic Fever Service of the House of the Good Samaritan.

Rutstein's non-teaching clinical work included studies on cardiovascular physiological changes in infectious diseases; an international study of the treatment of rheumatic fever; and research at the United States Veteran's Administration on measuring and improving the quality of medical care. His work on rheumatic fever took place in the United States, the United Kingdom and Canada and was supported by the American Heart Association's Council on Rheumatic Fever and by the British Medical Research Council.

Rutstein was also a prolific author. His scientific work was published in regional and national medical journals and his books include Lifetime Health Record (Harvard University Press, 1958), The Coming Revolution in Medicine (MIT Press, 1967), Engineering and Living Systems (MIT Press, 1970), and Blueprint for Medical Care (MIT Press, 1974). He also wrote for general periodicals such as The Atlantic and Harpers Magazine.

In 1955, Rutstein began a television series on WGBH-TV called "Facts of Medicine". The short program was designed to inform the general public about local and national health concerns and to introduce them to current research projects in medicine. "Facts of Medicine" ran for 40 episodes.

During the 1960s, Rutstein directed a study on forming health maintenance programs, lobbied for changes in state laws regarding birth control, and advocated for the role of nurse midwives in delivery rooms.

Rutstein was one-time president of the American Epidemiological Society and, as recognition of his work and respected position in the medical field, was elected as a member to the Council of the American Academy of Arts and Sciences, the French Academy of Medicine, and the English Royal Society of Medicine. He received awards for his work including the Jubilee Medal of the Swedish Medical Society, the Gold Heart Award from the American Heart Association, and the French Legion of Honour.
