= Elizabeth Cropper =

British art historian

- Born: Marjorie Elizabeth Cropper; 11 August 1944 (age 81); Dewsbury, West Yorkshire, England
- Education: Newnham College, Cambridge (MA); Bryn Mawr College (PhD)
- Occupation: Art Historian
- Organization(s): National Gallery of Art; Johns Hopkins University; Temple University

Marjorie Elizabeth Cropper (born 11 August 1944) is a British-born art historian with a special interest in Italian and French Renaissance and Baroque art and art literature. Dean of the National Gallery of Art’s Center for Advanced Study in the Visual Arts (CASVA) from December 2000 through May 2020, she previously held positions as Professor of Art History at Johns Hopkins University and director of the university’s Charles S. Singleton Center for Italian Studies at Villa Spelman in Florence.

== Early life ==
Born on 11 August 1944, Cropper was educated at Wakefield Girls' High School, winning a place at Newnham College, Cambridge. After studying History (Part I) and Architecture and Fine Arts (Part II) she graduated with a BA (Hons), subsequently converted to an MA. She was awarded an English Speaking Union and Fulbright Fellowship for graduate study at Bryn Mawr College, Pennsylvania, where, in 1972, she completed her Ph.D dissertation on the Italian printmaker and draftsman Pietro Testa.

== Career ==
Following a Leverhulme Fellowship at Clare Hall, Cambridge, and a visiting lectureship at Franklin & Marshall College, Cropper joined the Department of Art History at Temple University, Tyler School of Art. During her tenure at Temple University from 1973 to 1985, Cropper was a fellow and visiting scholar at a number of research institutions, including Harvard’s Villa I Tatti (1978–79, 1981), Johns Hopkins’ Villa Spelman (1981), and the National Gallery of Art's CASVA as the Samuel H. Kress Senior Fellow (1984–85).

Her first monograph, The Ideal of Painting: Pietro Testa’s Düsseldorf Notebook, was published in 1984 by Princeton University Press. This continued her line of scholarship linking early modern texts to the production and reception of works of art that included an influential article in the Art Bulletin on the ideal of female beauty and the vernacular style in Renaissance Italy. Awarded the Arthur Kingsley Porter Prize for the best article by a younger scholar, this study was included in the Art Bulletin's 2011 Centennial Anthology of articles that “made a difference to us as art historians and as people.”

After two years as a visiting associate (1983–85), Cropper joined the faculty of the Department of the History of Art at Johns Hopkins University as professor in 1985, where she would direct the university's Charles S. Singleton Center for Italian Studies from 1987–2000. While at Hopkins, Cropper held a number of visiting appointments at various international institutions, including directeur d’etudes associé at the École des Hautes Études en Sciences Sociales (1990–91, 1997), Slade Professor at Cambridge University (1992–93), and visiting professor at the Collège de France (1996); as well as a visiting membership at the Institute for Advanced Study, Princeton (1989). In 1994, she was named the inaugural Andrew W. Mellon Professor at the Center for Advanced Study in the Visual Arts, National Gallery of Art. This two-year appointment was established with the support of the Andrew W. Mellon Foundation in commemoration of the Gallery's fiftieth anniversary “to enable a distinguished art historian to pursue a project of scholarly research.”

In December 2000, following Henry A. Millon's retirement from the National Gallery of Art, Cropper was appointed as dean of the Center for Advanced Study in the Visual Arts. Her focus at the helm, as stated in an April 2010 Washington Post feature on the Center, has been to encourage the intellectual expansion of CASVA into a place that endeavors to study “all of art and visual culture, for all of time, for all the globe.” Following the example of dean Millon, Cropper contributes to CASVA's research by undertaking a long-term project with an international team of scholars intended to provide access to primary research materials for the field. Her chosen project will result in a multi-volume critical edition and annotated translation of Carlo Cesare Malvasia's Felsina pittrice (Bologna, 1678), “a history of painting in Bologna that both emulates and challenges Giorgio Vasari’s Lives (1550/1568).” Volumes One and Thirteen, devoted to the art of late medieval Bologna and the lives of Domenichino and Francesco Gessi, respectively, were published in 2012 and 2013. Published in 2017, Volume Two, Part Two (in two volumes), features the life of Marcantonio Raimondi but also includes the most detailed catalogue of prints published in Europe before the eighteenth century. Most recently, the life of Guido Reni was published in 2019 as Volume Nine. While heading CASVA, Cropper has also held a number of leadership roles within the national and international scholarly community. This includes professional service as Chair of the Advisory Committee for two Max-Planck-Gesellschaft, the Biblioteca Hertziana, Rome and Kunsthistorisches Institut, Florence, (2001–11), President of the Renaissance Society of America (2010–12), and Vice President of the American Philosophical Society (2016–19). She retired in May 2020. She has served on several fellowship committees outside CASVA, including those for The Andrew W. Mellon Foundation Distinguished Achievement Award and the Cullman Center at the New York Public Library.

== Scholarly interests ==
Cropper is interested in the relationship of theory to practice in the early modern period, and has been committed to an understanding of the role of literacy among artists, taking seriously their reasoning about their production. Her training at Cambridge with Michael Jaffé and Francis Haskell established a strong sense of the value of studying the historiography of art history: her essays on Mannerism, and on works by such artists as Bronzino and Pontormo follow a fundamental concern with the relationship between history and criticism. Essays on beauty, both male and female, have expanded interpretation of Renaissance portraiture and the depiction of the model in relation to the beholder. The relevance of biography to artistic production is a focus of Cropper's research, whether into the difficult and disorderly life of Artemisia Gentileschi or the stoic persistence of Nicolas Poussin. The Malvasia project reveals the extraordinary importance of the documentation of social life and artistic production in 17th century Italy.

Questions of imitation and originality lie at the heart of The Domenichino Affair (2005: Menzione speciale, Premio Salimbeni per la storia e la critica d’arte, 2006), in which the paradigm of novelty is examined as a distinguishing feature of the modern artistic condition. Domenichino was the first artist to be accused successfully of plagiarism, a charge that in itself was a symptom of changed cultural expectation in relation to the poetics of imitation. As Cropper has asserted, painters in 17th century Italy “faced the very problem of their relationship to tradition and authority and were for the first time compelled to claim their individuality in a historical continuum.”

== Personal life ==
Cropper was married to Charles Dempsey, who was former chair and professor emeritus in the Department of the History of Art at Johns Hopkins University, and who also specialized in Italian Renaissance and Baroque art. Cropper and Dempsey co-authored Nicolas Poussin: Friendship and the Love of Painting, which won the 1997 Jan Mitchell Prize for the History of Art and the 1998 Charles Rufus Morey Book Award of the College Art Association.

== Selected honors ==
- La Càtedra, Museo Nacional del Prado (2016)
- Mongan Prize, Villa I Tatti (2011), “given to a distinguished scholar of Renaissance art or connoisseurship who carries into a new generation the qualities of imaginative scholarship, personal generosity, and devotion to the institutions of art history that were exemplified in their own generation by Agnes and Elizabeth Mongan.”
- Elected Member, American Philosophical Society (1998)
- Elected Fellow, American Academy of Arts and Sciences (1993)

== Selected publications ==
- —, ed. Carlo Cesare Malvasia’s Felsina pittrice (1678): Lives of the Bolognese Painters. A Critical Edition and Annotated Translation. Vol. 9, Life of Guido Reni. Turnhout: Harvey Miller/Brepols, 2019.
- La Pintura Boloñesa en el Museo del Prado: tras las huellas de Malvasia como crítico de la pintura. Madrid: Museo Nacional del Prado and Abada Editores, S.L, 2017.
- —, ed. Carlo Cesare Malvasia’s Felsina pittrice (1678): Lives of the Bolognese Painters. A Critical Edition and Annotated Translation. Vol. 2, part 2, Life of Marcantonio Raimondi and Critical Catalogue of Prints by or after Bolognese Masters. Turnhout: Harvey Miller/Brepols, 2017.
- “I ritratti del Pontormo e del Rosso Fiorentino.” In Pontormo e Rosso Fiorentino: Divergenti vie della 'maniera,' edited by Carlo Falciani and Antonio Natali, 119–125. Florence: Mandragora, 2014. (English edition: Pontormo and Rosso Fiorentino: Diverging Paths of Mannerism. Florence: Mandragora, 2014.)
- —, ed. Carlo Cesare Malvasia's Felsina pittrice (1678): Lives of the Bolognese Painters. A Critical Edition and Annotated Translation. Vol. 13, Lives of Domenichino and Francesco Gessi. Turnhout: Harvey Miller/Brepols, 2013.
- —, ed. Carlo Cesare Malvasia's Felsina pittrice (1678): Lives of the Bolognese Painters. A Critical Edition and Annotated Translation. Vol. 1, Early Bolognese Painting. Turnhout: Harvey Miller/Brepols, 2012.
- "The Fortuna critica of Agnolo Bronzino". In Bronzino: Artist and Poet at the Court of the Medici/Bronzino. Pittore e poeta alla corte dei Medici, edited by Carlo Falciani and Antonio Natali, 23–33. Florence: Palazzo Strozzi, 2010. Exhibition catalog.
- "Reading Bronzino's Florentine Portraits". In Bronzino: Artist and Poet at the Court of the Medici/Bronzino. Pittore e poeta alla corte dei Medici, edited by Carlo Falciani and Antonio Natali, 245–255. Florence: Palazzo Strozzi, 2010. Exhibition catalog.
- The Domenichino Affair: Novelty, Imitation, and Theft in Seventeenth-Century Rome. New Haven and London: Yale University Press, 2005.
- "Pontormo and Bronzino: A Double Portrait". In Pontormo, Bronzino, and the Medici: The Transformation of the Renaissance Portrait, edited by Carl Brandon Strehlke, 1–34. Philadelphia: Philadelphia Museum of Art in association with Penn State University Press, 2004. Exhibition catalog.
- "Life on the Edge: Artemisia Gentileschi, Famous Woman Painter". In Orazio and Artemisia Gentileschi, edited by Keith Christiansen and Judith W. Mann, 262–281. New York: Metropolitan Museum of Art, 2001. Exhibition catalog.
- "Vivere sul filo del rasoio: Artemisia Gentileschi, pittrice famosa". In Orazio e Artemisia Gentileschi, edited by Keith Christiansen and Judith W. Mann, 262–281. Milano: Skira editore, 2001.
- Pontormo: Portrait of a Halberdier. Los Angeles: J. Paul Getty Museum, 1997.
- — and Charles Dempsey. Nicolas Poussin: Friendship and the Love of Painting. Princeton: Princeton University Press, 1996.
- "The Place of Beauty in the High Renaissance and its Displacement in the History of Art". In Place and Displacement in the Renaissance, edited by A. Vos, 159–205. Binghamton, NY: Center for Medieval and Early Renaissance Studies, 1995.
- "New Documents for Artemisia Gentileschi's Life in Florence". The Burlington Magazine, 136 (1993): 760–762.
- Pietro Testa: 1612–1650. Philadelphia: Philadelphia Museum of Art, 1988. Exhibition catalog.
- "The Beauty of Woman: Problems in the Rhetoric of Renaissance Portraiture". In Rewriting the Renaissance: The Discourses of Sexual Difference in Early Modern Europe, edited by Margaret W. Ferguson, Maureen Quilligan, and Nancy Vickers, 175–190. Chicago: Chicago University Press, 1986.
- The Ideal of Painting: Pietro Testa's Düsseldorf Notebook. Princeton: Princeton University Press, 1984.
- "On Beautiful Women, Parmigianino, Petrarchismo, and the Vernacular Style". Art Bulletin, 58 (1976): 374–394.
