= Henry Bourne (photographer) =

British photographer

Henry Bourne is a London based British photographer and image-maker. Working on portraiture, interiors, travel and still life photography. His editorial work has been published in magazines that include; Vogue (UK, US, and European editions), Harper's Bazaar (UK and US editions), T: The New York Times Style Magazine, The World of Interiors magazine, Wallpaper*, Vanity Fair, Condé Nast Traveller and W Magazine, among others. His work is part of the permanent collections of the National Portrait Gallery (London), the Design Museum (London), and the Museum of British Folklore.

== Early life ==
Bourne is the son of the historian Kenneth Bourne and Eleanor Anne Bourne (née Wells). Kenneth Bourne, a specialist in nineteenth-century British foreign policy, was Professor of International History at the London School of Economics from 1976 until his death.

== Career ==
Bourne began his career as a photographic assistant to Michael Joseph (1982–84), subsequently working as a freelance assistant to several photographers, including Mario Testino, before establishing his own practice in 1989.

He has worked extensively in editorial photography, contributing regularly to T: The New York Times Style Magazine, Vogue (UK, US and European editions), The World of Interiors, AD (US, French and German editions), Condé Nast Traveller (UK edition), Harper's Bazaar (UK editions), Wallpaper*, W Magazine, The Wall Street Journal, Vanity Fair and D la Repubblica.

== Books ==
His first monograph, Arcadia Britannica: A Modern British Folklore Portrait, was published by Thames & Hudson in 2015. Portraits of the participants of British folklore festivals and traditions, photographed at different events across the United Kingdom from 2009 onwards. It features a preface by Robin Muir and an introductory essay by Simon Costin, the founder and director of the Museum of British Folklore. Reviews and coverage appeared in The New York Times newspaper, T: The New York Times Style Magazine, BBC Culture, W Magazine, Elle Decor, The Guardian, The Independent on Sunday, The Financial Times, Vogue, Professional Photographer and the Royal Photographic Society Journal.

Turn of the Century: Portraits of Creative Interiors, Bourne's first retrospective book, was published by Rizzoli New York in 2024. Reviews and coverage appeared in the Financial Times, The World of Interiors, and Airmail, among others. The Financial Times described it as a compendium of interiors and portraiture portraying the private worlds of the titans of art, architecture and design. The World of Interiors described it as bringing together some of his most memorable interiors and portrait work across thirty years.

Bourne has contributed photography to other books, including The Ivy: The Restaurant and its Recipes and Le Caprice (both by A.A. Gill and published by Hodder & Stoughton); Dixonary by Tom Dixon (Violette Editions, 2013); Vogue 100: A Century of Style by Robin Muir (National Portrait Gallery, 2016); Hadid: Complete Works 1979–Today by Philip Jodidio (Taschen, 2016); and Paula Rego: Obedience and Defiance (ART/BOOKS, 2019).

== Exhibitions ==
Bourne's work has been included in exhibitions in the United Kingdom and internationally.

Early charity exhibition contributions include Fashion Acts (1996, 1997 and 1998), Condé Nast Traveller magazine exhibitions (1999 and 2002), and DIFFA (Design Industry Fighting Aids) New York (2000–01).

A solo exhibition of personal work, Henry Bourne, was held at 1-5 Exhibition Road, London (5–11 November 2008), as part of the London Design Festival. Reviewed by Wallpaper* magazine.

His British folklore portrait work was shown at the Central State Exhibition Hall (Manege), St Petersburg, Russia, as Modern British Folklore Portraits in 2010.

His work was included in Now & Then: A Show of Contemporary Art at Harris Lindsay, London (11–28 October 2011), alongside Jake and Dinos Chapman, Grayson Perry, Philip Taaffe and other artists.

His British folklore portraits were also exhibited at the Towner Art Gallery, Eastbourne, as part of Collective Observations: Folklore & Photography from Benjamin Stone to Flickr (13 October 2012 – 13 January 2013), curated by Simon Costin and Mellany Robinson for the Museum of British Folklore and supported by Arts Council England.

In 2013, his work was included in For Summer Is Acome Unto Day at Belmacz Gallery, London, curated by Simon Costin, which presented his photographs alongside artefacts from the Museum of British Folklore collection.

His portrait of Boris Johnson was included in Vogue 100: A Century of Style at the National Portrait Gallery, London (11 February – 23 May 2016), and subsequently at Manchester City Art Gallery. The exhibition marked the centenary of British Vogue magazine.

His folklore portrait photographs were included in The Ballad of British Folklore, an exhibition at Christie's South Kensington charting the history of the Museum of British Folklore (25 July – 1 September 2016). During the exhibition period, he participated in Christie's Lates: Festival of Folk (2 August 2016), a panel discussion with Simon Costin, Director of the Museum of British Folklore.

His British folklore portrait work was included in Making Mischief: Folk Costume in Britain at Compton Verney, Stratford-upon-Avon (11 February – 11 June 2023), and Making More Mischief: Folk Costume in Britain at London College of Fashion, University of the Arts London, Stratford (9 April – 22 June 2024). Both exhibitions were curated in collaboration with the Museum of British Folklore and supported by the National Lottery Heritage Fund. The Compton Verney exhibition was reviewed in Art Quarterly, the magazine of Art Fund, in Spring 2023, and Bourne's photograph was used on the cover of the magazine.

== Collections ==
Bourne's work is held in the permanent collection of portrait photography at the National Portrait Gallery, London, including his portrait of Sir Ken Adam (archival pigment print, 11 April 2012; NPG x137323), given by the artist in 2013. Two photographic portraits of Sir Terence Conran (1995) were acquired by the Design Museum, London, and donated as a gift from the artist in September 2020. His work is also held as part of the permanent collection of the Museum of British Folklore.

== Awards ==
Bourne received a Gold Medal Award from the Society of Publication Designers (USA) at their 34th Publication Design Competition (1997), for editorial photography.

He was nominated for the Citibank Private Bank Photography Prize 2000, run in association with The Photographers' Gallery, London.

He was a recipient of the American Photography 26 (AP26) award in 2010, with work originally created for Wallpaper* magazine.

He was the winner of the Best Photograph prize at the St Petersburg Photo Vernissage (Санкт-Петербургский Фотовернисаж) 2010, held at the Central Exhibition Hall, Manege, St Petersburg, Russia.

== Personal life ==
Bourne is married to the designer Harriet Anstruther.

== Portraits ==
Bourne's portrait subjects include Ken Adam, Queen Camilla, Tom Dixon, Zaha Hadid, Barry Humphries, Boris Johnson, Grayson Perry, Vanessa Redgrave, Paula Rego, Sophie, Duchess of Edinburgh and Bryn Terfel, among others.
