= James Wei (engineer) =

American chemical engineer (born 1930)

James Wei (Chinese: 韋潛光; born 1930) is a Chinese-born American chemical engineer.

Wei moved from China to the United States in 1949. He received his bachelor's degree from Georgia Institute of Technology in 1952, before pursuing graduate study at Massachusetts Institute of Technology, where he earned a master's and a doctor of science degree. He began working for Mobil Oil in 1955, and left the company in 1970 to accept the Allan P. Colburn Professorship of Chemical Engineering at the University of Delaware, where he taught until 1977. Wei returned to MIT the next year and remained affiliated with his alma mater until 1991, when he became dean of engineering at Princeton University and also served as Pomeroy and Betty Perry Smith Professor of Chemical Engineering. Wei stepped down as dean in 2002.

He was named a member of the National Academy of Engineering in 1978, credited with "advancement of chemical engineering by mathematical analysis of complex reaction of such analysis to commercial processes" and elected an academician of the Academia Sinica and member of the American Academy of Arts and Sciences, both in 1982.
