= Paul S. Russell =

American physician (1925–2026)

- Born: Paul Snowdell Russell Jr. January 22, 1925; Chicago, Illinois, U.S.
- Died: August 22, 2026 (aged 101); Westwood, Massachusetts, U.S.
- Education: University of Chicago
- Occupation: Physician
- Spouse: Allene Lummis (m. 1952; died. 2010)
- Children: 4

Paul Snowdell Russell Jr. (January 22, 1925 – August 22, 2026) was an American physician.

== Early life and career ==
Russell was born in Chicago, Illinois on January 22, 1925, the son of Paul S. Russell Sr., a banker and a former college football quarterback, and Carroll Mason, a financial banker for dancer Martha Graham. He attended Groton School. He attended the University of Chicago, earning his BA degree in philosophy in 1944, his BS degree in chemistry in 1945 and his MD degree in 1947. After earning his degrees, he worked at Massachusetts General Hospital, and served in the United States Air Force during the Korean War, which after earning his discharge, he completed his residency in Massachusetts in 1956

He taught at Columbia College of Physicians and Surgeons in New York for two years, and he served as a professor in the department of surgery at Harvard Medical School (HMS). During his years as a professor at HMS, in 1964, he was elected as a member of the American Academy of Arts and Sciences, and from 1988 to 2021, he served as chair and vice chair of the Joint Committee of the Countway Library. In 1998, he was named the John Homans Distinguished Professor.

In 2004, Russell was awarded the Medawar Prize by the Transplantation Society.

== Personal life and death ==
In 1952, Russell married Allene Lummis. They had four children. Their marriage lasted until her death in 2010.

Russell died at his home in Westwood, Massachusetts, on August 22, 2026, at the age of 101. According to his Dignity Memorial obituary, he was named a "legendary figure" by George Q. Daley, the dean of HMS.
