= Ulf Landmesser =

Ulf Landmesser (24 November 1970 in Dresden) is a German specialist for cardiology and internal medicine. He is professor at the Institute for Health Research in Berlin and Head of the Medical Clinic of Cardiology at the Charité in Berlin. Landmesser is known for his work on coronary interventions and modern methods of catheter-based heart valve therapy.

== Biography ==
From 1990 until 1997 Landmesser studied human medicine at the Hannover Medical School, the University of Connecticut in Farmington (USA) and the National Heart & Lung Institute in London; he specialised in internal medicine and cardiology at the Medical School of Hannover. In 2000–2001 he performed a post-doctoral fellowship at the Department of Cardiology at the Emory University School of Medicine, Atlanta (USA) as a scholar of the Alexander von Humboldt Foundation. Landmesser returned to Hannover and qualified as lecturer on the subject of Oxidative stress and endothelial dysfunction in cardiovascular diseases. When his specialist medical training in cardiology and internal medicine was acknowledged, he first had been working in Hannover until he started his employment as senior physician at the University Hospital of Zürich. In 2010 he was appointed professor by the University of Zürich. In 2010 he became head of Acute Cardiology and in 2012 deputy head of the Department of Cardiology at the University Hospital of Zürich. Since 2014 Landmesser has acted as chairman of the Department of Cardiology at the Charité in Berlin. Furthermore, from 2012 to 2014 he was visiting professor at the University College London and since 2009 has been a deputy editor of the European Heart Journal.

== Scientific contribution ==
Landmesser's research examines mechanisms leading to coronary disease and in particular to myocardial infarction as well as novel catheter-based diagnostic and therapeutic procedures of cardiovascular medicine. The research group of Landmesser characterizes vascular function and the role of lipids in coronary disease and could show, that high-density lipoprotein (HDL) loses important vasoprotective properties in patients with coronary disease or chronic kidney disease, that can help to explain why raising of HDL-C was not effective in reducing cardiovascular risk in several recent large clinical trials. Landmesser and his team validated novel high-resolution catheter-based imaging methods for coronary arteries. and examined novel catheter-based approaches of stroke prevention. Professor Landmesser is active in the task force of the European Society of Cardiology establishing European Guidelines for the treatment of coronary disease.

== Awards ==
In 1999 the Swiss Society for Cardiology awarded Landmesser with the "Young Investigator Award". In 2000 he received the "Young Investigator Conference on Angiotensin II Award" from Merck & Co. One year later Landmesser was honored with the "Servier Young Investigator Award" of the International Symposium on Mechanisms of Vasodilatation, Boston, Mass. and the "Outstanding Fellows in Cardiology Special Recognition Award" of the Cardiology Fellows Forum of Excellence, Anaheim, California. In 2012 he received the "Frederick Goetz" prize of the University of Zurich for his research on HDL cholesterol.

== Memberships in scientific organisations ==
Landmesser is deputy editor of the European Heart Journal (since 2008) and member of the Scientific Program Committee of the European Society of Cardiology (since 2010). He also is member of the working group "Interventional Cardiology and Acute Coronary Syndrome" of the Swiss Society for Cardiology, board member of the group "Cardiovascular Biology Working Group" and editor of the section "Intravascular Imaging" of the scientific journal Current Cardiovascular Imaging Reports. Since 2012 he has been Treasurer and Executive Board Member of the European Association for Cardiovascular Prevention and Rehabilitation (EACPR).

== Publications ==
- Ulf Landmesser publications indexed by Google Scholar
- List of publications, PubMed
