= Howard Stein (philosopher) =

American philosopher (1929–2024)

- Born: January 21, 1929; New York City, U.S.
- Died: March 8, 2024 (aged 95)
- Education: Columbia University (BA); University of Chicago (PhD); University of Michigan (MS)
- Awards: Guggenheim Fellowship (1974)
- Scientific career
- Fields: Philosophy of science
- Workplaces: Brandeis University; Case Western Reserve University; Columbia University; University of Chicago

Howard Stein (January 21, 1929 – March 8, 2024) was an American philosopher and historian of science. He was a professor at the University of Chicago.

== Biography ==
Stein was born on January 21, 1929, in New York City. He received a BA from Columbia University in 1947, where he studied under John Herman Randall Jr., Irwin Edman, and Ernest Nagel, before obtaining a PhD from the University of Chicago in 1958, and an MS from the University of Michigan in 1959. He joined the faculty of the University of Chicago in 1951 before teaching at Brandeis University, Case Western Reserve University and Columbia University. He also worked for Honeywell as a mathematician and engineer in between his teaching career. He returned to the University of Chicago in 1980 and retired in 2000.

Stein's work was centered on the philosophy of physics, as well as the history of physics and mathematics. His 1967 paper, "Newtonian Space Time," inaugurated the modern study of the foundations of physics.

Stein was elected to the American Academy of Arts and Sciences in 1989. He also received a Guggenheim Fellowship in 1974.

Stein died on March 8, 2024.
