= Masayori Inouye =

Masayori Inouye is a distinguished professor in the department of biochemistry and molecular biology at the Robert Wood Johnson Medical School at Rutgers University. He, along with his team, discovered natural antisense RNA. Inouye was also a key scientist involved in the discovery and characterization of retrons, which are retroviral-like elements found in various bacterial genomes.

In 2019, he was elected to the National Academy of Sciences.

== Early life and career ==
Inouye was born in Port Arthur in Manchuria in 1934 and after the World War II, he went back to Japan. He studied at Osaka University, Japan and got his Ph.D. in 1963. After 5-years postdoctoral experience, he moved to Princeton University as a research associate working on the mechanism of cell division. 1970, he joined the faculty at State University of New York at Stony Brook. In 1987, he took a position as chair of the department of biochemistry at Robert Wood Johnson Medical School.
