= William H. Bossert =

American mathematician

William H. Bossert (born 1937) is an American mathematician. He is the David B. Arnold, Jr. Professor of Science, Emeritus at Harvard University. He was the housemaster of Lowell House for 23 years. He received his PhD from Harvard in 1963.

== Publications ==
With Edward O. Wilson. A primer of population biology (1971)
