= Charles Dempsey =

American art historian (1937–2022)

Charles G. Dempsey
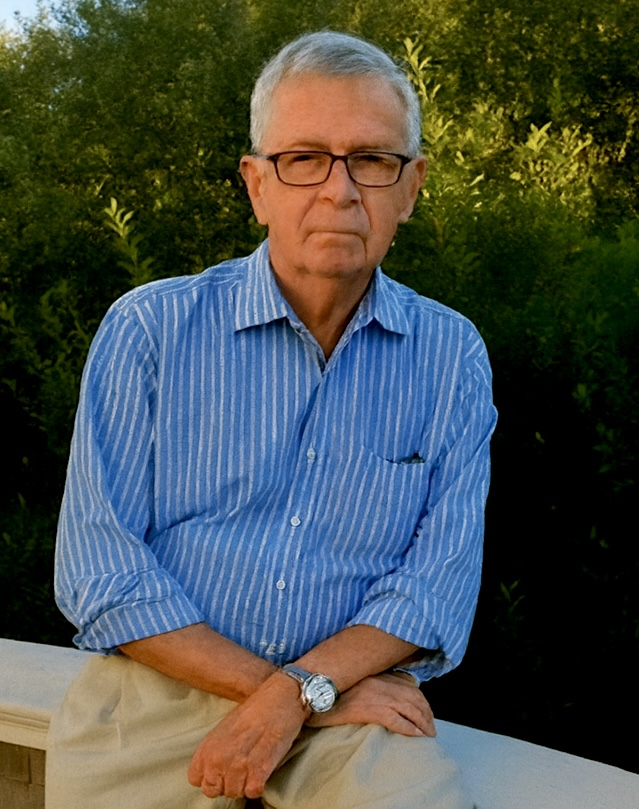
- Charles G. Dempsey, 2015
- Born: March 11, 1937; Providence, Rhode Island, U.S.
- Died: February 22, 2022 (aged 84); Washington, D.C., U.S.
- Spouse: Elizabeth Cropper (m. 1975–2022)
- Awards: Lindback Teaching Award (1969); A. Kingsley Porter Prize (1970); Jan Mitchell Prize (1997); Charles Rufus Morey Award (1998)

Academic background
- Education: Swarthmore College (BA); Princeton University (MFA, PhD)
- Thesis: 'Poussin and the Natural Order' (1963)
- Doctoral advisors: Erwin Panofsky and Rensselaer W. Lee

Academic work
- Discipline: Art history
- Sub-discipline: Italian Renaissance; Baroque
- Institutions: Bryn Mawr College; Johns Hopkins University
- Notable works: The Portrayal of Love (1992); Inventing the Renaissance Putto (2001); The Early Renaissance and Vernacular Culture (2012)

Charles Gates Dempsey (March 11, 1937 – February 22, 2022) was an American art historian of the Italian Renaissance and Baroque. A longtime professor at Johns Hopkins University, he was known for reorienting Renaissance studies toward vernacular culture—festivals, masking, and poetics—alongside style and iconography. His books include The Portrayal of Love (1992), Inventing the Renaissance Putto (2001), and The Early Renaissance and Vernacular Culture (2012). With Elizabeth Cropper he co-authored Nicolas Poussin: Friendship and the Love of Painting (1996), which won both the Jan Mitchell Prize and the College Art Association’s Charles Rufus Morey Book Award.

== Early life and education ==
Dempsey was born in Providence, Rhode Island, on March 11, 1937. He received a BA from Swarthmore College (1959) and an MFA (1962) and PhD (1963) from Princeton University, where he studied with Erwin Panofsky.

== Career ==
From 1963 to 1965 Dempsey was a Rome Prize Fellow in the History of Art at the American Academy in Rome. He taught at Bryn Mawr College from 1965 to 1980, serving as department chair (1975–1980), and then joined Johns Hopkins University in 1980 as professor of Italian Renaissance and Baroque art; he chaired the department (1989–1995) and directed studies at the university’s Center for Italian Studies at Villa Spelman in Florence. He retired as professor emeritus in 2007.

At Hopkins he advised multiple generations of scholars. Colleagues highlighted his breadth—from pagan mythology and Renaissance putti to the Carracci, Caravaggio, Poussin, and Bosch—and his insistence on rigorous, textually grounded argument. He helped reshape the field’s engagement with the Bolognese writer Carlo Cesare Malvasia and seventeenth-century art writing. Dempsey also maintained long ties to Harvard’s Villa I Tatti: he delivered the Bernard Berenson Lectures later published as The Early Renaissance and Vernacular Culture, and is listed among I Tatti fellows (VIT ’74).

== Scholarship and contributions ==
Dempsey’s work emphasized the interaction of classical form with local, vernacular practices and literary poetics. The Portrayal of Love situated Botticelli’s Primavera within Laurentian poetry; Inventing the Renaissance Putto traced the spiritello from demonology to civic spectacle; and The Early Renaissance and Vernacular Culture synthesized these concerns in a set of Bernard Berenson Lectures delivered at Villa I Tatti. Reviews in leading journals recognized these books for their originality and influence.

With Elizabeth Cropper he co-wrote Nicolas Poussin: Friendship and the Love of Painting (1996), a widely reviewed study that linked Poussin’s theory and practice to a network of friendships and texts; the book won the 1997 Jan Mitchell Prize and the 1998 Charles Rufus Morey Book Award.

== Legacy and influence ==
Peers and students credit Dempsey with redirecting aspects of Renaissance studies away from purely Neoplatonic frames toward vernacular culture, festival, masking, and poetics, while remaining attentive to style and iconography. The breadth of his scholarship—ranging from Botticelli and the spiritelli to the Carracci, Caravaggio, Poussin, and Bosch—was frequently noted in memorial tributes and reviews. A 2012 Festschrift, Gifts in Return: Essays in Honour of Charles Dempsey, gathered contributions from leading historians of Italian art, reflecting his impact across generations of scholarship and teaching. He also served the field institutionally, including appointment to the National Gallery of Art’s Center for Advanced Study in the Visual Arts (CASVA) Board of Advisors in 1985.

== Honors ==
Dempsey received the Christian R. & Mary F. Lindback Foundation Award for Distinguished Teaching (Bryn Mawr), the College Art Association’s A. Kingsley Porter Prize (for his 1968 Art Bulletin article “Et nos cedamus amori”), and election to the American Academy of Arts and Sciences (1993) and the American Philosophical Society (1998). He held a fellowship at Villa I Tatti (Harvard University Center for Italian Renaissance Studies) in 1974. In 2019 he became a corresponding member of the Slovenian Academy of Sciences and Arts (SAZU).

== Works ==
The list below draws primarily on the bibliography compiled in the 2012 Festschrift.

=== Books and edited volumes ===
- Annibale Carracci and the Beginnings of Baroque Style. Glückstadt: J. J. Augustin, 1977; 2nd ed., with new introduction, Florence: Edizioni Cadmo (Villa I Tatti Series 16), 2000.
- La Galerie des Carrache. Paris: Banque de Paris, 1984. (with essay by A. Brejon de Lavargnée; supplementary materials by V. Konig, Ph. Levillain, Ph. Morel, F. Uginet).
- The Portrayal of Love: Botticelli’s Primavera and Humanist Culture at the Time of Lorenzo the Magnificent. Princeton: Princeton University Press, 1992.
- Annibale Carracci: The Farnese Gallery, Rome. New York: George Braziller, 1995. (Simultaneously published in Italian as Annibale Carracci: Palazzo Farnese, Turin: Società Editrice Internazionale, 1995).
- (with Elizabeth Cropper) Nicolas Poussin: Friendship and the Love of Painting. Princeton: Princeton University Press, 1996.
- (ed.) Quattrocento Adriatico: Fifteenth-Century Art of the Adriatic Rim. Bologna: Nuova Alfa Editoriale, 1996.
- Inventing the Renaissance Putto. Chapel Hill: University of North Carolina Press, 2001.
- Il Ritratto dell’Amore: La Primavera di Botticelli e la cultura umanistica al tempo di Lorenzo il Magnifico (Italian translation of The Portrayal of Love with new introduction). Naples: La Stanza delle Scritture, 2007.
- The Early Renaissance and Vernacular Culture (Bernard Berenson Lectures 3). Cambridge, MA: Harvard University Press, 2012.

=== Dissertation ===
- Poussin and the Natural Order. PhD, Princeton University, 1963 (University Microfilms).

=== Articles and chapters (selected, by decade) ===
==== 1960s ====
- “Poussin and Egypt.” Art Bulletin 45 (1963): 109–119.
- “Poussin’s Marine Venus at Philadelphia: A Re-Identification Accepted.” Journal of the Warburg and Courtauld Institutes 28 (1965): 338–343.
- “The Textual Sources of Poussin’s Marine Venus in Philadelphia.” Journal of the Warburg and Courtauld Institutes 29 (1966): 438–443.
- “The Perception of Nature in Poussin’s Earlier Works.” Journal of the Warburg and Courtauld Institutes 29 (1966): 219–249.
- “Euanthes redivivus: Rubens’s Prometheus Bound.” Journal of the Warburg and Courtauld Institutes 30 (1967): 420–425.
- “Mercurius Ver: The Sources of Botticelli’s Primavera.” Journal of the Warburg and Courtauld Institutes 31 (1968): 251–273.
- “'Et nos cedamus amori': Observations on the Farnese Gallery.” The Art Bulletin 50 (1968): 363–374. (A. Kingsley Porter Prize.)
- Reviews and notes in Art Bulletin 52 (1970): 324–326; Bryn Mawr Alumnae Bulletin (1966–67): 67–70.

==== 1970s ====
- “Botticelli’s Three Graces.” Journal of the Warburg and Courtauld Institutes 34 (1971): 326–330.
- “Masaccio’s Trinity: Altarpiece or Tomb?” Art Bulletin 54 (1972): 279–281.
- “Castiglione at Philadelphia.” The Burlington Magazine 114 (1972): 117–120.
- “Tiepolo Etchings at Washington.” The Burlington Magazine 114 (1972): 503–507.
- Reviews in Art Bulletin 58 (1976): 129–131; 61 (1979): 141–144, 323–326.
- “Some Observations on the Education of Artists in Florence and Bologna during the later Sixteenth Century.” Art Bulletin 62 (1980): 552–569.

==== 1980s ====
- “Annibal Carrache au Palais Farnèse.” In Le Palais Farnèse, École française de Rome, 1981, I/1: 269–311.
- “Annibale Carracci’s Christ and the Canaanite Woman.” The Burlington Magazine 123 (1981): 91–95.
- “Mythic Inventions in Counter-Reformation Painting.” In Rome in the Renaissance: The City and the Myth, ed. P. A. Ramsay, Binghamton, NY, 1982, 55–75.
- Reviews/essays in The New Criterion (1982–83); The Burlington Magazine (1983); Renaissance Quarterly (1984); Times Literary Supplement (1986); Art in America (1986); Renaissance Quarterly (1986).
- “The Carracci Postille to Vasari’s Lives.” Art Bulletin 68 (1986): 72–76.
- “Malvasia and the Problem of the Early Raphael and Bologna.” In Raphael before Rome, ed. James Beck, National Gallery of Art, Studies in the History of Art 17 (1986): 57–70.
- “The Carracci Reform of Painting.” In The Age of Correggio and the Carracci, exh. cat., National Gallery of Art, 1986, 237–254 (and Italian trans., Bologna, 1986, 237–254).
- “The Carracci and the Devout Style in Emilia.” In Emilian Painting of the 16th and Seventeenth Centuries, ed. H. Millon (National Gallery of Art), Bologna, 1987, 75–87.
- “The State of Research in Italian Painting of the Seventeenth Century” (with Elizabeth Cropper). Art Bulletin 69 (1987): 494–509.
- “Renaissance Hieroglyphic Studies and Gentile Bellini’s Saint Mark Preaching in Alexandria.” In Hermeticism and the Renaissance, ed. I. Merkel and A. G. Debus, Folger Books, 1988, 342–365.
- “Guido Reni in the Eyes of his Roman Contemporaries.” In Guido Reni 1575–1642 (exh. cat.), Los Angeles, 1988, 101–118.
- “Federico Barocci and the Discovery of Pastel.” In Marcia B. Hall (ed.), Color and Technique in Renaissance Painting, Locust Valley, 1988, 55–65.
- “Poussin’s Sacrament of Confirmation: The Scholarship of Roma sotteranea and Dal Pozzo’s Museum chartaceum.” In Cassiano dal Pozzo: Atti del Seminario Internazionale di Studi, ed. F. Solinas, Rome, 1989, 244–261.
- “The Carracci Academy.” In Academies of Art between Renaissance and Romanticism, ed. A. W. A. Boschloo et al., The Hague, 1989, 33–43.

==== 1990s ====
- Introduction to Gli scritti dei Carracci: Ludovico, Annibale, Agostino (Villa Spelman Colloquia 2), ed. Giovanna Perini, Bologna, 1990, 9–31.
- “Sua cuique mihi mea…” The Burlington Magazine 132 (1990): 490–492.
- “National Expression in Italian Sixteenth-century Art: Problems of the Past and Present.” In Nationalism in the Visual Arts, ed. R. Etlin, National Gallery of Art, Studies in the History of Art 29 (1991): 15–24.
- “The Most Difficult Iconographical Problem in the World: Domenichino’s Madonna of the Rosary.” In Il luogo ed il ruolo della città di Bologna, ed. G. Perini, 1992, 341–355.
- “Mavors armipotens: The Poetics of Self-representation in Poussin’s Mars and Venus.” In Der Künstler über sich in seinem Werk, ed. M. Winner, 1992, 435–452.
- “Idealism and Naturalism in Rome around 1600.” In Il classicismo, Bologna, 1993, 233–243.
- “Lorenzo’s Ombra.” In Lorenzo il Magnifico e il suo mondo, ed. G. A. Garfagnini, Florence, 1994, 341–355.
- “Sujets et thèmes dans la peinture de Poussin.” In P. Rosenberg and L.-A. Prat, Nicolas Poussin 1594–1665, Paris, 1994, 88–92.
- Reviews in TLS (1995) and Renaissance Quarterly 48 (1995): 422–424.
- “Donatello’s Spiritelli.” In Ars naturam adiuvans (Festschrift for Matthias Winner, ed. V. Von Flemming et al.), 1996, 50–61.
- “Mort en Arcadie: Les derniers tableaux de Poussin.” In Nicolas Poussin… (Musée du Louvre), 1996, 50–61.
- “L’impression de merveilleux à la galerie du palais Farnèse.” (Louvre colloque), 1996, 195–221.
- “The 1998 Josephine Waters Bennett Lecture: Portraits and Masks…” Renaissance Quarterly 52 (1999): 1–42.
- “Niccolò di Giovanni’s Spiritelli in Trogir.” In Festschrift for Ksenijo Rozman, Ljubljana, 1999, 43–55.
- “Poussin’s Ecstasy of St. Paul: Charles Le Brun’s ‘Over-Interpretation’.” In Commemorating Poussin, ed. K. Scott and G. Warwick, Cambridge, 1999, 114–133.

==== 2000s ====
- “Nicolas Poussin between Italy and France: Poussin’s Death of Germanicus.” In L’Europa e l’arte italiana, ed. M. Seidel, Florence, 2000, 320–335.
- “'Le vite de’ pittori...' di Giovan Pietro Bellori.” (2000), 99–103; “I Carracci a Palazzo Farnese…,” plus catalogue entries, in L’Idea del Bello, ed. E. Borea et al., Rome, 2000.
- “Renaissance Hieroglyphic Studies: An Overview.” In Interpretation and Allegory, ed. J. Whitman, Leiden, 2000, 365–378.
- Reviews: Musacchio (2001); Fumaroli (2002); Olson (2002).
- “Caravaggio e i due stili naturalistici: Speculare contro Macolare.” In Caravaggio nel IV centenario, ed. C. Volpi, 2002, 185–196.
- Review: Rosand, Myths of Venice, Renaissance Quarterly 56 (2003): 454–456.
- “Love and the Figure of the Nymph in Botticelli’s Art.” (2003); Italian version 2004. In Botticelli from Lorenzo the Magnificent to Savonarola, ed. D. Arasse et al., 25–38.
- Intro., Drawing Relationships in Northern Italian Renaissance Art, ed. G. Periti, Aldershot, 2004, 1–9.
- “Sicut in utrem aquas maris: Jerome Bosch’s Prolegomenon to the Garden of Earthly Delights.” MLN 119 (Italian Issue Suppl., 2004): 246–270.
- “Giuliano di Piero de’ Medici.” In The Folio Society Book of the 100 Greatest Portraits (2004), 36–37.
- “Historia and Anachronism in Renaissance Art.” Art Bulletin 87 (2005): 416–421.
- Reviews: Kasl (2005); “Hommage à Daniel Arasse” (2005); “Baccio Baldini’s Sibyls and Albumasar’s Introductorium maius.” (2006).
- “Caravaggio and the Two Naturalist Styles: Specular versus Macular.” In Warwick (ed.), Caravaggio: Realism, Rebellion, Reception (2006), 91–100.
- Reprint: “The Carracci and the Devout Style in Emilia.” In Cole (ed.), Sixteenth-Century Italian Art (2006), 388–402.
- Reviews: Unglaub; Hipp (2007); Falomir (2007).
- “Painting in Bologna from the Carracci to Crespi.” In Captured Emotions (Getty, 2008), 1–13.
- Preface to Le “Stanze” di Guido Reni, ed. B. Bohn, Uffizi, 2008, xi–xiv.
- “The Importance of Vernacular Style in Renaissance Art: The Invention of Simone Martini’s Maestà …” In Cropper (ed.), Dialogues in Art History, National Gallery of Art (2009), 189–205.
- “Disegno and Logos, Paragone and Academy.” In The Accademia Seminars, ed. P. M. Lukehart, National Gallery of Art, 2009, 43–53.

==== 2010s ====
- Review: Stuart Lingo, Federico Barocci (Art Bulletin 92.3, 2010): 251–256.
- “Nicolas Poussin et l’invention de l’idylle mythologique.” In Cohn (ed.), Daniel Arasse: historien de l’art (2010), 121–132.
- “The Painter’s Arcadia.” In Gauguin, Cézanne, Matisse—Arcadia 1900, exh. cat., PMA, New Haven, 2012, 125–141.
- “Poussin, Duquesnoy, and the Greek Style.” In Di Cosmo & Fatticcioni (eds.), Le componenti del Classicismo secentesco (2013), 159–167.
- “Malvasia’s Il Claustro di S. Michele in Bosco (Bologna, 1694).” In Anselmi et al. (eds.), Bologna: Cultural Crossroads… (2013), 107–112.
- Review: Christophe Poncet, La scelta di Lorenzo (Renaissance Quarterly 66.3, 2013): 977–978.
- “Raphael’s Legacy in Italy circa 1600.” In Falomir (ed.), Late Raphael (Prado, 2013), 156–159.
- Review: Francisco de Hollanda, On Antique Painting (The Burlington Magazine 156, 2014): 537.
- Review: David Young Kim, The Traveling Artist in the Italian Renaissance (The Burlington Magazine 158, 2016): 39–40.

== Death ==
Dempsey died of a heart attack in Washington, D.C., on February 22, 2022. Obituaries from Johns Hopkins, the Renaissance Society of America, and The New York Times site noted his influence as a scholar, teacher, and mentor.
