= Lynn T. Landmesser =

American biologist (1943–2024)

- Born: 30 November 1943; Santa Ana, California
- Died: 29 November 2024 (aged 80); California
- Occupation: Biological scientist
- Parents: Charles Landmesser (father); Eleanor Cerveny Landmesser (mother)

Lynn T. Landmesser (30 November 1943 – 29 November 2024) was a biologist from Santa Ana, California.

Landmesser received her bachelor's degree in 1965 and her master's degree in 1969 in zoology while attending the University of California Los Angeles. She is known for her developmental neuroscience research, particularly in relation to the spinal cord and how spinal motor circuits form.

== Early life ==
Landmesser was raised by her parents, Charles and Eleanor Cerveny Landmesser, and spent much of her childhood traveling and taking family camping vacations. She graduated from The Academy of Our Lady of Peace in 1961. She then attended UCLA, initially intending to become a medical technologist, before switching her major to zoology, where she developed an interest in neuroscience.

== Career ==
Landmesser started her career immediately after receiving her PhD in 1969 with a postdoctoral fellowship at the University of Utah, where she first started her research in neurobiology. In 1972, she started researching at Yale University. She stayed there for 11 years, and along with her research there, she was given the opportunity to work with students. She attributes much of her success in her discoveries with her work with the students on their projects. In 1983, she moved again to research at the University of Connecticut. She moved for the last time to Case Western Reserve University in 1993 where she continued researching neuroscience. She was appointed the Chair of the Department of Neurosciences in 1999 and stepped down after 15 years, on June 30, 2013.

Landmesser died on 29 November 2024, one day before her 81st birthday.

== Honors and awards ==
- President, Society for Developmental Biology (1988-1989)
- Arturo Rosenblueth Distinguished Professor, Center for Advanced Studies, IPN, Mexico (1987)
- Wiersma Visiting professor of neuroscience, California Institute of Technology (1989)
- Secretary, Society for Neuroscience (1992-1994)
- American Academy of Arts and Sciences (1993)
- Arline H. and Curtis F. Garvin Professor of Medicine (2001)
- National Academy of Sciences, U.S.A. (2001)
