= Henry Bourne (pharmacologist) =

American pharmacologist and cell biologist

Henry R. Bourne
- Born: March 1, 1940; Danville, Virginia, U.S.
- Died: April 15, 2023 (aged 83)
- Education: Harvard University (A.B.); Johns Hopkins University (M.D.)
- Known for: G-protein signalling, chemotaxis, graduate-education reform
- Awards: Member, National Academy of Sciences (1994); Fellow, American Association for the Advancement of Science (1996); Member, American Academy of Arts and Sciences (1992)
- Scientific career
- Fields: Pharmacology, Cell biology
- Workplaces: University of California, San Francisco

Henry Reid Bourne (1 March 1940 – 15 April 2023) was a distinguished American pharmacologist and cell biologist known for his pioneering work in elucidating heterotrimeric G-protein signalling pathways and for his advocacy concerning reforms in biomedical graduate education. He held the position of chair of the UCSF Department of Pharmacology from 1984 to 1992 and was a co-founder of the university's interdisciplinary Program in Biological Sciences.

== Early life and education ==
Bourne was born in Danville, Virginia, where he grew up as the son of a surgeon and a civil-rights advocate. He attended Phillips Academy Andover, serving as editor of the school newspaper, before earning an A.B. in history and literature from Harvard University in 1960. Following a brief period in journalism, he pursued medical studies and received his M.D. from Johns Hopkins University in 1964, graduating at the top of his class. His post-graduate training included an internship at Columbia-Presbyterian Medical Center and research conducted at the National Institutes of Health as part of the Vietnam-era "Yellow Beret" program.

== Career and research ==
Bourne joined the faculty at UCSF in 1969 and was promoted to full professor in 1971. His seminal research focused on G-proteins. His laboratory demonstrated the fundamental mechanism by which G-proteins cycle between active (GTP-bound) and inactive (GDP-bound) states. This work also established links between mutant G-proteins and human diseases, including acromegaly and fibrous dysplasia. In the 1990s, his research focus shifted to chemotaxis. His studies revealed that neutrophils compartmentalize G-protein signals into distinct membrane domains, a process crucial for directed migration. During his tenure as department chair, he was instrumental in orienting UCSF pharmacology towards molecular and cellular approaches. He also played a key role in establishing the graduate *Cell Biology* program at UCSF, which became a model for interdisciplinary scientific training.

== Publications and advocacy ==
Bourne was a prolific author, publishing more than 150 primary articles and 95 book chapters in scientific literature. After transitioning to emeritus status in 2008, having retired in 2005, he authored three books reflecting his perspectives on science and academia:

- Ambition and Delight: A Life in Experimental Biology (2009) – a memoir.
- Paths to Innovation (2011) – a historical account of UCSF's development into a leading biomedical research institution.
- Follow the Money (2016) – a critical examination of financial structures in academic health centers.

He was also an active voice in the discourse surrounding challenges in U.S. biomedical training, particularly addressing the increasing duration of training and the imbalance between PhD graduates and available academic positions.

== Awards and honours ==
- Elected Member of the National Academy of Sciences (1994).
- Elected Fellow of the American Association for the Advancement of Science (1996).
- Elected Member of the American Academy of Arts and Sciences (1992).
- UCSF Lifetime Achievement in Mentoring Award (2005).
- Mentioned as a previous UCSF recipient of the Feodor Lynen Medal from the German Society for Biochemistry and Molecular Biology.

== Personal life ==
Bourne was recognized for his sharp intellect, sense of humor, and passion for literature. He established a book club at UCSF, which began with James Joyce's Ulysses (novel). He was survived by his three children and five grandchildren.

== Selected works ==
- Bourne HR (2009). Ambition and Delight: A Life in Experimental Biology. Xlibris. ISBN 978-1450036577.
- Bourne HR (2011). Paths to Innovation. University of California Medical Humanities Press. ISBN 978-0985023702.
- Bourne HR, Vermillion EB (2016). Follow the Money. University of California Medical Humanities Press. ISBN 978-0-9963242-1-2.
